= Inch of water =

Measurement unit for pressure

Inches of water is a non-SI unit for pressure. It is also given as inches of water gauge (iwg or in.w.g.), inches water column (inch wc, in. WC, " wc, etc. or just wc or WC), inAq, Aq, or inH_{2}O. The units are conventionally used for measurement of certain pressure differentials such as small pressure differences across an orifice, or in a pipeline or shaft, or before and after a coil in an HVAC unit.

It is defined as the pressure exerted by a column of water of 1 inch in height at defined conditions. At a temperature of 4 °C (39.2 °F) pure water has its highest density (1000 kg/m^{3}). At that temperature and assuming the standard acceleration of gravity, 1 inAq is approximately 249.082 pascals (0.0361263 psi).

Alternative standard in uncommon usage are 60 °F (15,6 °C), or 68 °F (20 °C), and depends on industry standards rather than on international standards.

Feet of water is an alternative way to specify pressure as height of a water column; it is conventionally equated to 2,989.067 pascals (0.4335275 psi).

In North America, air and other industrial gases are often measured in inches of water when at low pressure. This is in contrast to inches of mercury or pounds per square inch (psi, lbf/in^{2}) for larger pressures. One usage is in the measurement of air ("wind") that supplies a pipe organ and is referred simply as inches. It is also used in natural gas distribution for measuring utilization pressure (U.P., i.e. the residential point of use) which is typically between 6 and 7 inches WC or about 0.25 lbf/in^{2}.

1 inAq ≈ 0.036 lbf/in^{2}, or 27.7 inAq ≈ 1 lbf/in^{2}.

1 inH_{2}O	= 249.08891 pascals
	= 2.4908891 mbar or hectopascals
= 2.54 cmH_{2}O
≈ 0.002458316 atm
≈ 1.868320 Torr or mmHg
≈ 0.0735559 inHg
≈ 0.03612729 lbf/in^{2}

== See also ==
- Pressure head
- Barometer
- Millimetre of mercury
