= Pressure head =

In fluid mechanics, the height of a liquid column

In fluid mechanics, pressure head is the height of a liquid column that corresponds to a particular pressure exerted by the liquid column on the base of its container. It may also be called static pressure head or simply static head (but not static head pressure).

Mathematically this is expressed as:

$$\psi = \frac{p}{\gamma} = \frac{p}{\rho \, g}$$

where

$\psi$ Psi (Greek) is pressure head (which is actually a length, typically in units of meters or centimetres of water)
$p$ is fluid pressure (i.e. force per unit area, typically expressed in pascals)
$\gamma$ is the specific weight (i.e. force per unit volume, typically expressed in N/m^{3} units)
$\rho$ is the density of the fluid (i.e. mass per unit volume, typically expressed in kg/m^{3})
$g$ is acceleration due to gravity (i.e. rate of change of velocity, expressed in m/s^{2}).

Note that in this equation, the pressure term may be gauge pressure or absolute pressure, depending on the design of the container and whether it is open to the ambient air or sealed without air.

== Head equation ==
Pressure head is a component of hydraulic head, in which it is combined with elevation head. When considering dynamic (flowing) systems, there is a third term needed: velocity head. Thus, the three terms of velocity head, elevation head, and pressure head appear in the head equation derived from the Bernoulli equation for incompressible fluids:

$$h_{v} + z_\text{elevation} + \psi = C\,$$

where

$h_{v}$ is velocity head,
$z_\text{elevation}$ is elevation head,
$\psi$ is pressure head, and
$C$ is a constant for the system

== Practical uses for pressure head ==
This is a Venturi meter shown with two pressure openings to the ambient air. This meter is measuring pressure head in two parts of a flowing fluid in order to calculate the pressure drop experienced by the fluid. If this fluid were to move faster than shown, the fluid level at opening on the right will decrease. As the fluid speed increases to the point where fluid is no longer drawn up into the opening, a siphon will form. In a Venturi siphon, ambient air will be drawn into the fluid stream at the opening on the right while the opening on the left remains full of fluid. ($p>0$ and $g>0$) If the meter is turned upside down, we say by convention that $g<0$ and the fluid inside the vertical columns will pour out the two holes. See discussion below.

Fluid flow is measured with a wide variety of instruments. The venturi meter in the diagram on the left shows two columns of a measurement fluid at different heights. The height of each column of fluid is proportional to the pressure of the fluid. To demonstrate a classical measurement of pressure head, we could hypothetically replace the working fluid with another fluid having different physical properties.

For example, if the original fluid was water and we replaced it with mercury at the same pressure, we would expect to see a rather different value for pressure head. In fact the specific weight of water is 9.8 kN/m^{3} and the specific weight of mercury is 133 kN/m^{3}. So, for any particular measurement of pressure head, the height of a column of water will be about [133/9.8 = 13.6] 13.6 times taller than a column of mercury would be. So if a water column meter reads "13.6 cm H_{2}O", then an equivalent measurement is "1.00 cm Hg".

This example demonstrates why there is some confusion surrounding pressure head and its relationship to pressure. Scientists frequently use columns of water (or mercury) to measure pressure (manometric pressure measurement), since for a given fluid, pressure head is proportional to pressure. Measuring pressure in units of "mm of mercury" or "inches of water" makes sense for instrumentation, but these raw measurements of head must frequently be converted to more convenient pressure units using the equations above to solve for pressure.

In summary pressure head is a measurement of length, which can be converted to the units of pressure (force per unit area), as long as strict attention is paid to the density of the measurement fluid and the local value of g.

== Implications for gravitational anomalies on ψ ==
We would normally use pressure head calculations in areas in which $g$ is constant. However, if the gravitational field fluctuates, we can prove that pressure head fluctuates with it.

- If we consider what would happen if gravity decreases, we would expect the fluid in the venturi meter shown above to withdraw from the pipe up into the vertical columns. Pressure head is increased.
- In the case of weightlessness, the pressure head approaches infinity. Fluid in the pipe may "leak out" of the top of the vertical columns (assuming $p>0$).
- To simulate negative gravity, we could turn the venturi meter shown above upside down. In this case gravity is negative, and we would expect the fluid in the pipe to "pour out" the vertical columns. Pressure head is negative (assuming $p>0$).
- If $p<0$ and $g>0$, we observe that the pressure head is also negative, and the ambient air is sucked into the columns shown in the venturi meter above. This is called a siphon, and is caused by a partial vacuum inside the vertical columns. In many venturis, the column on the left has fluid in it ($\psi>0$), while only the column on the right is a siphon ($\psi<0$).
- If $p<0$ and $g<0$, we observe that the pressure head is again positive, predicting that the venturi meter shown above would look the same, only upside down. In this situation, gravity causes the working fluid to plug the siphon holes, but the fluid does not leak out because the ambient pressure is greater than the pressure in the pipe.
- The above situations imply that the Bernoulli equation, from which we obtain static pressure head, is extremely versatile.

== Applications ==
=== Static ===
A mercury barometer is one of the classic uses of static pressure head. Such barometers are an enclosed column of mercury standing vertically with gradations on the tube. The lower end of the tube is bathed in a pool of mercury open to the ambient to measure the local atmospheric pressure. The reading of a mercury barometer (in mm of Hg, for example) can be converted into an absolute pressure using the above equations.

If we had a column of mercury 767 mm high, we could calculate the atmospheric pressure as (767 mm)•(133 kN/m^{3}) = 102 kPa. See the torr, millimeter of mercury, and pascal (unit) articles for barometric pressure measurements at standard conditions.

=== Differential ===
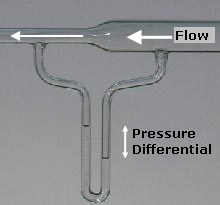
A flow of air through a venturi meter, showing the columns connected in a U-shape (a manometer) and partially filled with water. The meter is "read" as a differential pressure head in centimeters or inches of water.

The venturi meter and manometer is a common type of flow meter which can be used in many fluid applications to convert differential pressure heads into volumetric flow rate, linear fluid speed, or mass flow rate using Bernoulli's principle. The reading of these meters (in inches of water, for example) can be converted into a differential, or gauge pressure, using the above equations.

=== Velocity head ===
The pressure of a fluid is different when it flows than when it is not flowing. This is why static pressure and dynamic pressure are never the same in a system in which the fluid is in motion. This pressure difference arises from a change in fluid velocity that produces velocity head, which is a term of the Bernoulli equation that is zero when there is no bulk motion of the fluid. In the picture on the right, the pressure differential is entirely due to the change in velocity head of the fluid, but it can be measured as a pressure head because of the Bernoulli principle. If, on the other hand, we could measure the velocity of the fluid, the pressure head could be calculated from the velocity head. See the Derivations of Bernoulli equation.

== See also ==
- Centimetre of water
- Pressure measurement
- Hydraulic head or velocity head, which includes a component of pressure head
- Venturi effect
