= Centimetre or millimetre of water =

Unit of pressure

A centimetre or millimetre of water (US spelling centimeter or millimeter of water) are less commonly used measures of pressure based on the pressure head of water.

== Centimetre of water ==
centimetre of water
- Unit of: Pressure
- Symbol: cmH_{2}O

Conversions
1 cmH_{2}O in ...	... is equal to ...
- SI units: 98.0665 Pa
- English Engineering units: 1.422334×10^{−2} psi

A centimetre of water is a unit of pressure. It may be defined as the pressure exerted by a column of water of 1 cm in height at 4 °C (temperature of maximum density) at the standard acceleration of gravity, so that 1 cmH_{2}O (4°C) = 999.9720 kg/m^{3} × 9.80665 m/s^{2} × 1 cm = 98.063754138 Pa ≈ 98.0638 Pa, but conventionally a nominal maximum water density of 1000 kg/m^{3} is used, giving 98.0665 Pa.

The centimetre of water unit is frequently used to measure the central venous pressure, the intracranial pressure while sampling cerebrospinal fluid, as well as determining pressures during mechanical ventilation or in water supply networks (then usually in metres water column). It is also a common unit of pressure in the speech sciences. This unit is commonly used to specify the pressure to which a CPAP machine is set after a polysomnogram.

1 cmH_{2}O (conventional)	= 98.0665 pascals
	= 0.01 metre water (mH_{2}O), metre water column (m wc) or metre water gauge (m wg)
= 10 mm wg
= 0.980665 mbar or hPa
≈ 0.3937008 inH_{2}O
≈ 0.0009678411 atm
≈ 0.7355592 torr
≈ 0.7355591 mm Hg
≈ 0.02895902 inHg
≈ 0.01422334 psi

== Millimetre of water ==
millimetre of water
- Unit of: Pressure
- Symbol: mmH_{2}O

Conversions
1 mmH_{2}O in ...	... is equal to ...
- SI units: 9.80665 Pa
- English Engineering units: 1.422334×10^{−3} psi

Millimetre of water (US spelling millimeter of water) is a unit of pressure. It may be defined as the pressure exerted by a column of water of 1 mm in height at 4 °C (temperature of maximum density) at the standard acceleration of gravity, so that 1 mmH_{2}O (4 °C) = 999.9720 kg/m^{3} × 9.80665 m/s^{2} × 1 mm = 9.8063754138 Pa ≈ 9.80638 Pa, but conventionally a nominal maximum water density of 1000 kg/m^{3} is used, giving 9.80665 Pa.

1 mmH_{2}O (conventional)	= 9.80665 pascals
	= 0.001 metre water (mH_{2}O), metre water column (m.wc) or metre water gauge (m wg)
= 0.1 cm wg
= 0.0980665 mbar or hPa
≈ 0.03937008 inH_{2}O
≈ 9.678411×10^{−5} atm
≈ 0.07355592 torr
≈ 0.07355591 mmHg
≈ 0.002895902 inHg
≈ 0.001422334 psi

In limited and largely historic contexts it may vary with temperature, using the equation:

P = ρ·g·h/1000,
where
P: pressure in Pa
ρ: density of water (conventionally 1000 kg/m^{3} at 4 °C)
g: acceleration due to gravity (conventionally 9.80665 m/s^{2} but sometimes locally determined)
h: water height in millimetres.

The unit is often used to describe how much water rainwear or other outerwear can take or how much water a tent can resist without leaking.

== See also ==
- Inch of mercury
- Inch of water
- Millimetre of mercury
