= Standard atmosphere (unit) =

Unit of pressure defined as 101325 Pa

Atmosphere
- Unit of: Pressure
- Symbol: atm

Conversions
1 atm in ...	... is equal to ...
- SI units: 101.325 kPa
- US customary units: 14.69595 psi 29.92126 inHg
- other metric units: 1.013250 bar 760 mmHg

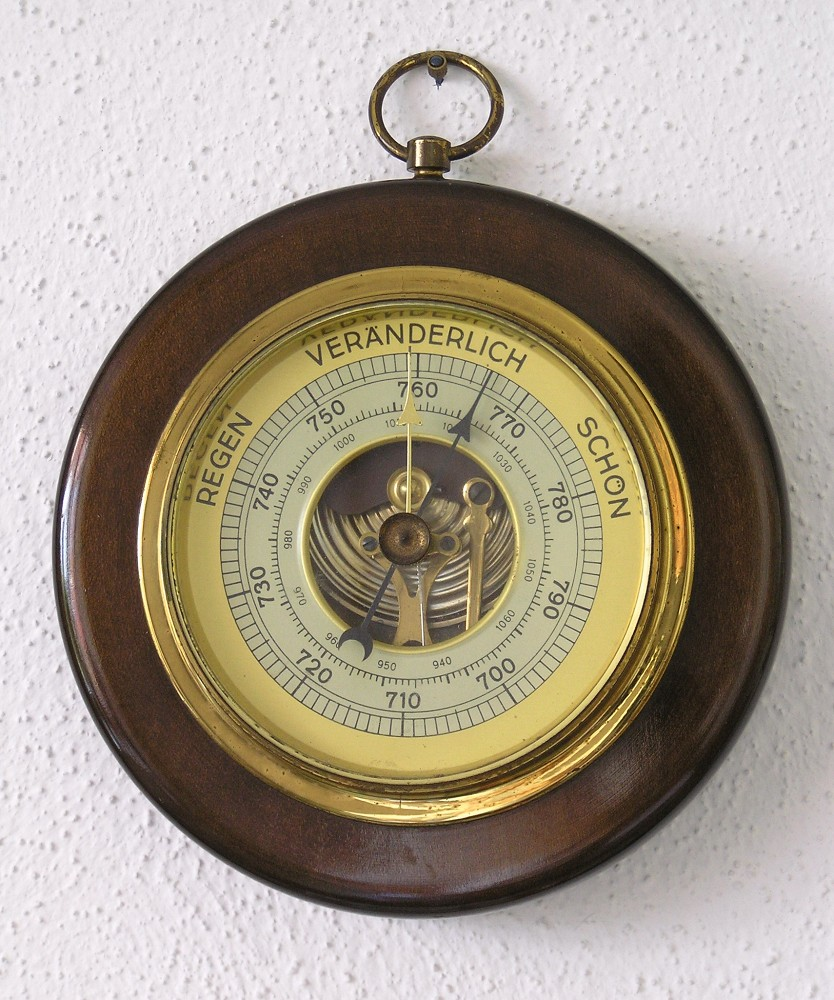
Aneroid barometer for household use from c. 1925

The standard atmosphere (symbol: atm) is a unit of pressure defined as 101325 Pa. It is sometimes used as a reference pressure or standard pressure. It is approximately equal to Earth's average atmospheric pressure at sea level.

== History ==
The standard atmosphere was originally defined as the pressure exerted by a 760 mm column of mercury at 0 °C (32.00 °F; 273.15 K) and standard gravity (g_{n} = 9.80665 m/s^{2}). It was used as a reference condition for physical and chemical properties, and the definition of the Celsius temperature scale set 100 °C as the boiling point of water at this pressure. In 1954, the 10th General Conference on Weights and Measures (CGPM) adopted standard atmosphere for general use and affirmed its definition of being precisely equal to 1013250 dynes per square centimetre (101325 Pa). This defined pressure in a way that is independent of the properties of any particular substance. In addition, the CGPM noted that there had been some misapprehension that the previous definition (from the 9th CGPM) "led some physicists to believe that this definition of the standard atmosphere was valid only for accurate work in thermometry."

In chemistry and in various industries, the reference pressure referred to in 'standard temperature and pressure' was commonly 1 atm (101.325 kPa) prior to 1982, but standards have since diverged; in 1982, the International Union of Pure and Applied Chemistry recommended that for the purposes of specifying the physical properties of substances, standard pressure should be precisely 100 kPa (1 bar).

== Pressure units and equivalencies ==
Pressure units
	Pascals	Bars	Standard atmospheres	Pounds per square inch	Millimetres of mercury	Inches of mercury	Technical atmospheres	Torrs
1 Pa	≡ 1 N/m^{2}	= 1×10^{−5} bar	≈ 9.86923×10^{−6} atm	≈ 1.45038×10^{−4} psi	≈ 7.50062×10^{−3} mmHg	≈ 2.95300×10^{−4} inHg	≈ 1.01972×10^{−5} kgf/cm^{2}	≈ 7.50062×10^{−3} Torr
1 bar	= 100000 Pa	≡ 100 000 N/m^{2}	≈ 0.98692 atm	≈ 14.5038 psi	≈ 750.062 mmHg	≈ 29.5300 inHg	≈ 1.01972 kgf/cm^{2}	≈ 750.062 Torr
1 atm	= 101325 Pa	= 1.01325 bar	≡ 101 325 N/m^{2}	≈ 14.6959 psi	≈ 760.000 mmHg	≈ 29.9213 inHg	≈ 1.03323 kgf/cm^{2}	= 760 Torr
1 psi	≈ 6894.76 Pa	≈ 0.06895 bar	≈ 0.06805 atm	≡ 1 lb/in^{2}	≈ 51.7149 mmHg	≈ 2.03602 inHg	≈ 0.07031 kgf/cm^{2}	≈ 51.7149 Torr
1 mmHg	≈ 133.322 Pa	≈ 1.33322×10^{−3} bar	≈ 1.31579×10^{−3} atm	≈ 0.01934 psi	≡ g_{n} × .001 m × 13595.1 kg/m^{3}	≈ 0.03937 inHg	≈ 1.35951×10^{−3} kgf/cm^{2}	≈ 1.00000 Torr
1 inHg	≈ 3386.39 Pa	≈ 0.03386 bar	≈ 0.03342 atm	≈ 0.49115 psi	= 25.4 mmHg	≡ g_{n} × .0254 m × 13595.1 kg/m^{3}	≈ 0.0345316 kgf/cm^{2}	≈ 25.4000 Torr
1 kgf/cm^{2}	≈ 98066.5 Pa	≈ 0.98066 bar	≈ 0.96784 atm	≈ 14.2233 psi	≈ 735.559 mmHg	≈ 28.9590 inHg	≡ 1 kgf/cm^{2}	≈ 735.559 Torr
1 Torr	≈ 133.322 Pa	≈ 1.33322×10^{−3} bar	≈ 1.31579×10^{−3} atm	≈ 0.01934 psi	≈ 1.00000 mmHg	≈ 0.03937 inHg	≈ 1.35951×10^{−3} kgf/cm^{2}	≡ (101 325)/760 = (20 265)/172 N/m^{2}

A pressure of 1 atm can also be stated as:

≈ 1.033 kgf/cm^{2}
≈ 10.33 m H_{2}O
≈ 760 mmHg
≈ 29.92 inHg
≈ 406.782 in H_{2}O
≈ 2116.22 pounds-force per square foot (lbf/ft^{2})

The notation ata has been used to indicate an absolute pressure measured in either standard atmospheres (atm) or technical atmospheres (at).

== See also ==
- International Standard Atmosphere
