= Kilogram-force per square centimetre =

Unit of pressure

kilogram-force per square centimetre
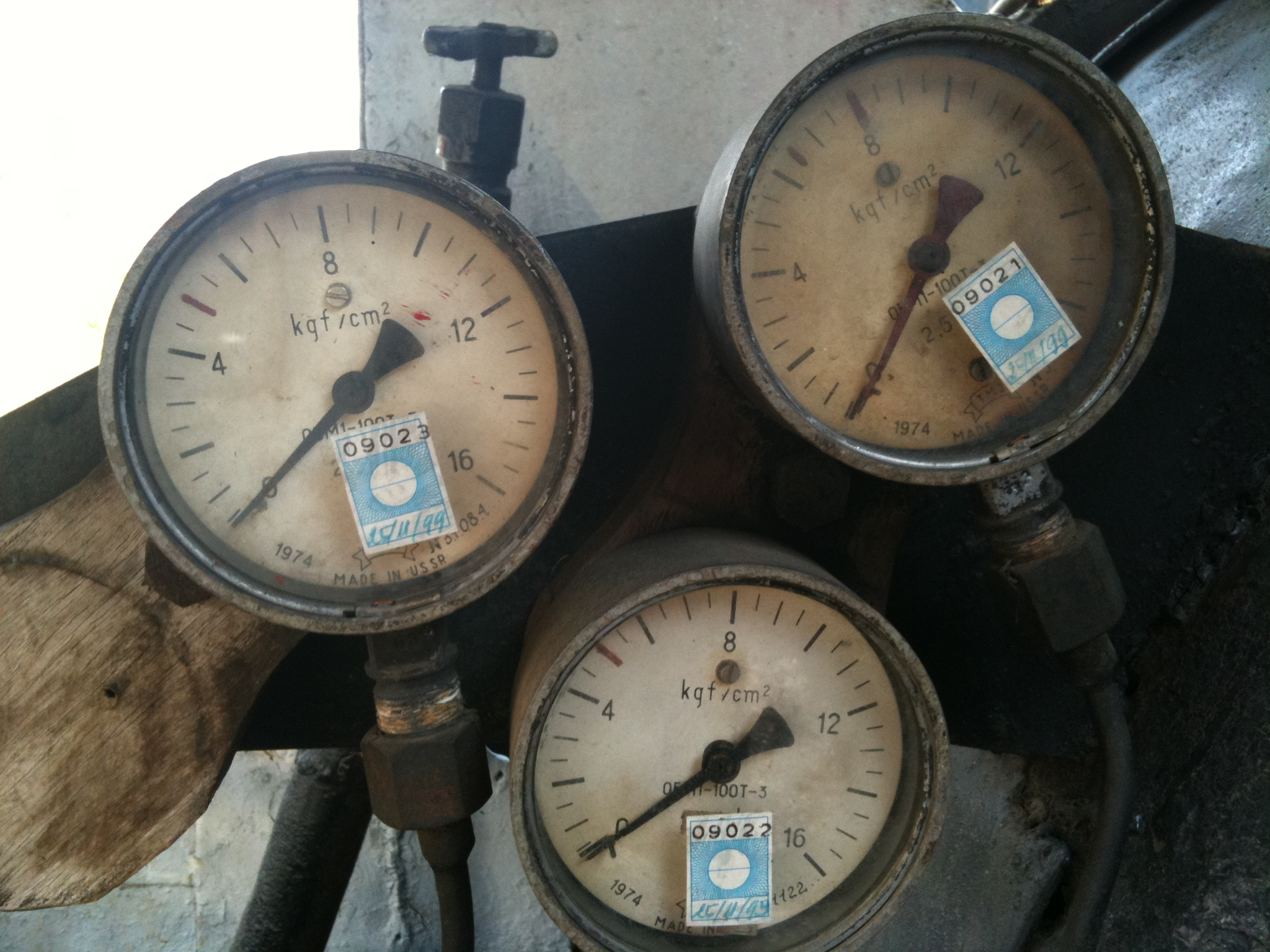
- Soviet-made pressure gauges using kgf/cm^{2}

General information
- Unit of: Pressure
- Symbol: kgf/cm^{2}, at

Conversions
1 kgf/cm^{2} in ...	... is equal to ...
- SI units: 98.06650 kPa
- FPS units: 14.22334 psi

A kilogram-force per square centimetre (kgf/cm^{2}), often just kilogram per square centimetre (kg/cm^{2}), or kilopond per square centimetre (kp/cm^{2}) is a deprecated unit of pressure using metric units. It is not a part of the International System of Units (SI), the modern metric system. 1 kgf/cm^{2} equals 98.0665 kPa (kilopascals) or 0.980665 bar—2% less than a bar. It is also known as a technical atmosphere (symbol: at).

Use of the kilogram-force per square centimetre continues primarily due to older pressure measurement devices still in use.

This use of the unit of pressure provides an intuitive understanding for how a body's mass, in contexts with roughly standard gravity, can apply force to a scale's surface area, i.e. kilogram-force per square (centi-)metre.

In SI units, the unit is converted to the SI derived unit pascal (Pa), which is defined as one newton per square metre (N/m^{2}). A newton is equal to 1 kg⋅m/s^{2}, and a kilogram-force is 9.80665 N, meaning that 1 kgf/cm^{2} equals 98.0665 kilopascals (kPa).

In some older publications, kilogram-force per square centimetre is abbreviated ksc instead of kgf/cm^{2}.

Pressure units
	Pascals	Bars	Standard atmospheres	Pounds per square inch	Millimetres of mercury	Inches of mercury	Technical atmospheres	Torrs
1 Pa	≡ 1 N/m^{2}	= 1×10^{−5} bar	≈ 9.86923×10^{−6} atm	≈ 1.45038×10^{−4} psi	≈ 7.50062×10^{−3} mmHg	≈ 2.95300×10^{−4} inHg	≈ 1.01972×10^{−5} kgf/cm^{2}	≈ 7.50062×10^{−3} Torr
1 bar	= 100000 Pa	≡ 100 000 N/m^{2}	≈ 0.98692 atm	≈ 14.5038 psi	≈ 750.062 mmHg	≈ 29.5300 inHg	≈ 1.01972 kgf/cm^{2}	≈ 750.062 Torr
1 atm	= 101325 Pa	= 1.01325 bar	≡ 101 325 N/m^{2}	≈ 14.6959 psi	≈ 760.000 mmHg	≈ 29.9213 inHg	≈ 1.03323 kgf/cm^{2}	= 760 Torr
1 psi	≈ 6894.76 Pa	≈ 0.06895 bar	≈ 0.06805 atm	≡ 1 lb/in^{2}	≈ 51.7149 mmHg	≈ 2.03602 inHg	≈ 0.07031 kgf/cm^{2}	≈ 51.7149 Torr
1 mmHg	≈ 133.322 Pa	≈ 1.33322×10^{−3} bar	≈ 1.31579×10^{−3} atm	≈ 0.01934 psi	≡ g_{n} × .001 m × 13595.1 kg/m^{3}	≈ 0.03937 inHg	≈ 1.35951×10^{−3} kgf/cm^{2}	≈ 1.00000 Torr
1 inHg	≈ 3386.39 Pa	≈ 0.03386 bar	≈ 0.03342 atm	≈ 0.49115 psi	= 25.4 mmHg	≡ g_{n} × .0254 m × 13595.1 kg/m^{3}	≈ 0.0345316 kgf/cm^{2}	≈ 25.4000 Torr
1 kgf/cm^{2}	≈ 98066.5 Pa	≈ 0.98066 bar	≈ 0.96784 atm	≈ 14.2233 psi	≈ 735.559 mmHg	≈ 28.9590 inHg	≡ 1 kgf/cm^{2}	≈ 735.559 Torr
1 Torr	≈ 133.322 Pa	≈ 1.33322×10^{−3} bar	≈ 1.31579×10^{−3} atm	≈ 0.01934 psi	≈ 1.00000 mmHg	≈ 0.03937 inHg	≈ 1.35951×10^{−3} kgf/cm^{2}	≡ (101 325)/760 = (20 265)/172 N/m^{2}

1 at	= 98.0665 kPa
1 at	≈ 0.96784 standard atmospheres

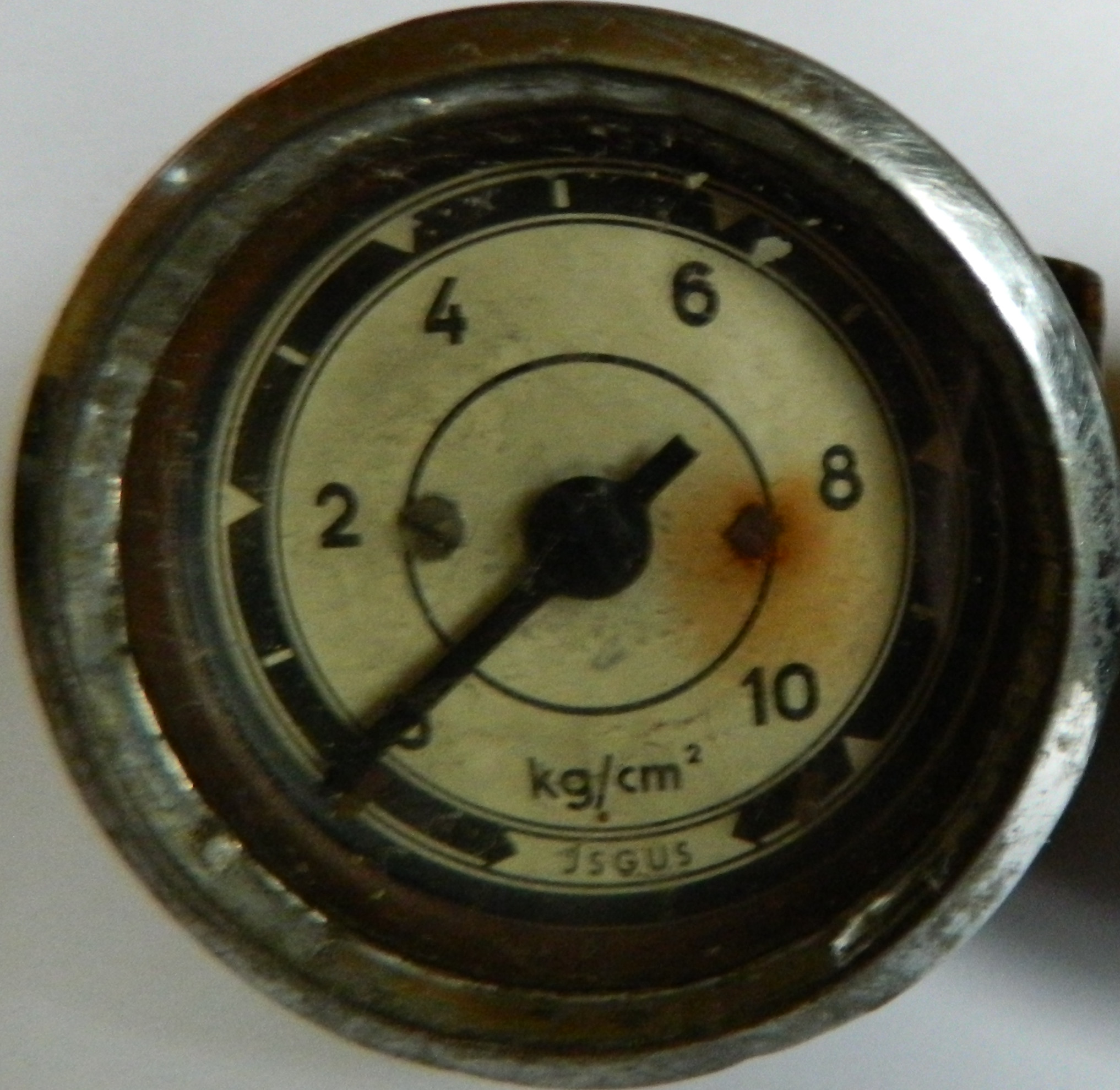
Pressure gauge from unknown source produced by ISGUS GmbH.

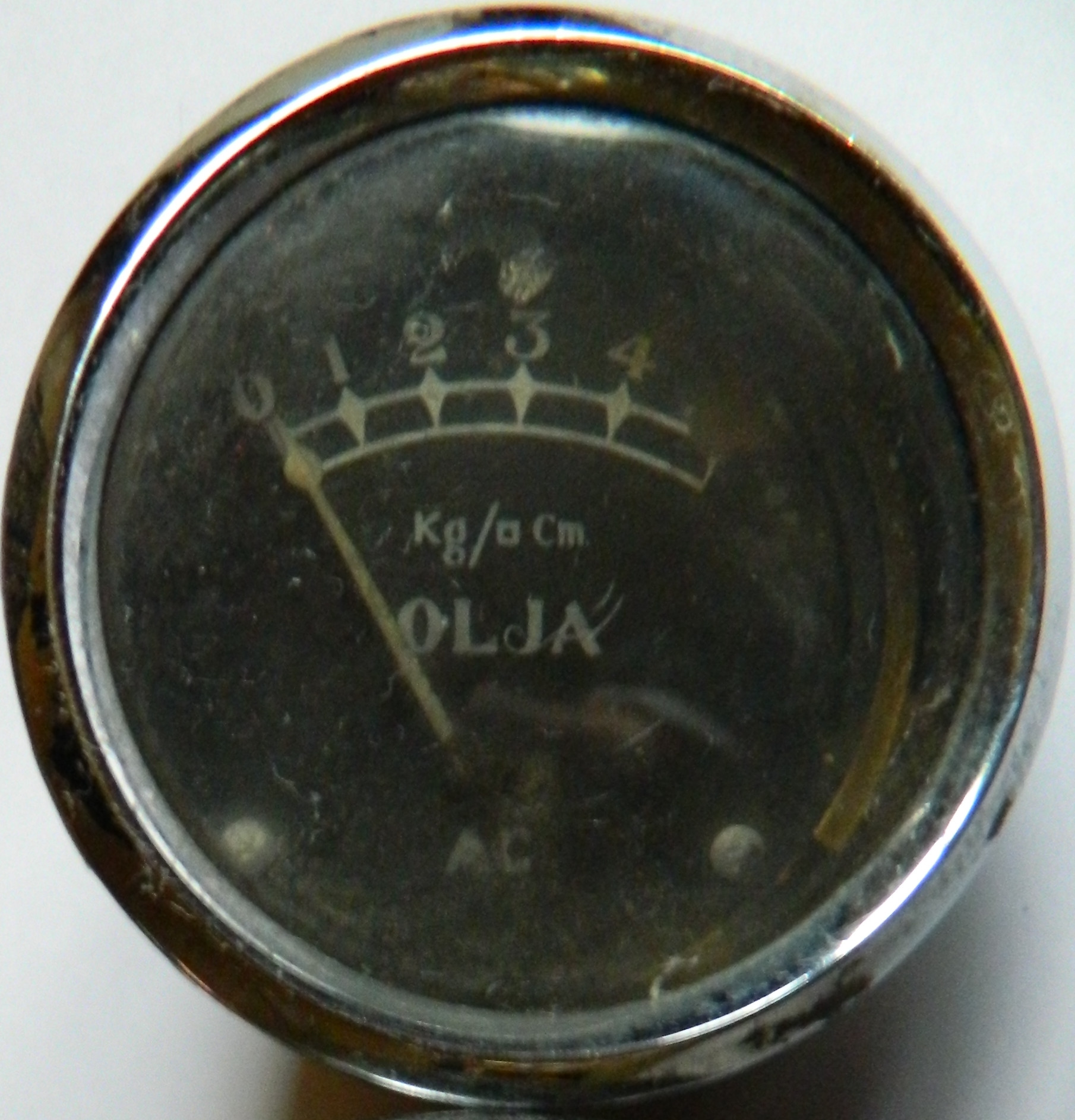
Pressure gauge from unknown source. Note the visual square instead of ^{2}. (Olja means "oil" in Swedish)

== Ambiguity of at ==
The symbol "at" clashes with that of the katal (symbol: "kat"), the SI unit of catalytic activity; a kilotechnical atmosphere would have the symbol "kat", indistinguishable from the symbol for the katal. It also clashes with that of the non-SI unit, the attotonne, but that unit would more likely be rendered as the equivalent SI unit, the picogram.
