= Abdominal decompression =

Abdominal decompression is an obstetric procedure during which a negative pressure is applied intermittently to a pregnant woman's abdomen.

== Efficacy ==
No benefits of abdominal decompression have been found in healthy pregnant women. Abdominal decompression has no effect on blood pressure of the mother. It also has no effect on the newborn baby's condition and subsequent intellectual development. Its effects on pre-eclampsia, low birthweight and fetal distress during labour are unclear.

== Technique ==
Abdominal decompression consists of placing a rigid covered dome around the abdomen, with the inside being decompressed to -50 to -100 mmHg for 15 to 30 seconds out of each minute for 30 minutes, one to three times daily, or continuously during labour. Abdominal decompression has been known to treat abdominal compartment syndrome (ACS) helping patients who have intra-abdominal pressure (IAP) and organ dysfunction.

== See also ==
- Maternal-fetal medicine
- Obstetrical nursing
