= Pressure =

Force distributed over an area

- Pressure exerted by particle collisions inside a closed container. The collisions that exert the pressure are highlighted in red.
- Common symbols: p, P
- SI unit: pascal (Pa)
- In SI base units: kg⋅m^{−1}⋅s^{−2}
- Derivations from other quantities: p = F / A
- Dimension: $\mathsf{M} \mathsf{L}^{-1} \mathsf{T}^{-2}$

Pressure (symbol: p or P) is the force applied perpendicular to the surface of an object per unit area over which that force is distributed. Gauge pressure (also spelled gage pressure) (Note: The preferred spelling varies by country and even by industry. Further, both spellings are often used within a particular industry or country. Industries in British English-speaking countries typically use the "gauge" spelling.) is the pressure relative to the ambient pressure.

Various units are used to express pressure. Some of these derive from a unit of force divided by a unit of area; the SI unit of pressure, the pascal (Pa), for example, is one newton per square metre (N/m^{2}); similarly, the pound-force per square inch (psi, symbol lbf/in^{2}) is the traditional unit of pressure in the imperial and US customary systems. Pressure may also be expressed in terms of standard atmospheric pressure; the unit atmosphere (atm) is equal to this pressure, and the torr is defined as 1/760 of this. Manometric units such as the centimetre of water, millimetre of mercury, and inch of mercury are used to express pressures in terms of the height of column of a particular fluid in a manometer.

== Definition ==
Pressure is the amount of force applied perpendicular to the surface of an object per unit area. The symbol for it is p or P. The IUPAC recommendation for pressure is a lower-case p. However, upper-case P is widely used. The usage of P versus p depends upon the field in which one is working, on the nearby presence of other symbols for quantities such as power and momentum, and on writing style.

=== Formula ===
Pressure	Volume
(Stress)	(Strain)
Temperature	Entropy
Chemical potential	Particle number

Mathematically:
$$p = \frac{F}{A}, \text{ or } P = \frac{F}{A},$$
where:

- $p$ is the pressure,
- $F$ is the magnitude of the normal force,
- $A$ is the area of the surface on contact.

Pressure is a scalar quantity. It relates the vector area element (a vector normal to the surface) with the normal force acting on it. The pressure is the scalar proportionality constant that relates these two normal vectors:
$$d\mathbf{F}_n = -p\,d\mathbf{A} = -p\,\mathbf{n}\,dA.$$

The minus sign comes from the convention that the force is considered towards the surface element, while the normal vector points outward. The equation has meaning in that, for any surface S in contact with the fluid, the total force exerted by the fluid on that surface is the surface integral over S of the right-hand side of the above equation.

The pressure, as a scalar, has no direction. The force given by the previous relationship to the quantity has a direction, but the pressure does not. If we change the orientation of the surface element, the direction of the normal force changes accordingly, but the pressure remains the same.

Pressure is distributed to solid boundaries or across arbitrary sections of fluid normal to these boundaries or sections at every point. It is a fundamental parameter in thermodynamics, and it is conjugate to volume. It is defined as a derivative of the internal energy of a system:
$$p = -\left(\frac{\partial U}{\partial V}\right)_{S, N},$$
where:

- $U$ is the internal energy,
- $V$ is the volume of the system,
- The subscripts mean that the derivative is taken at fixed entropy ($S$) and particle number ($N$).

=== Units ===
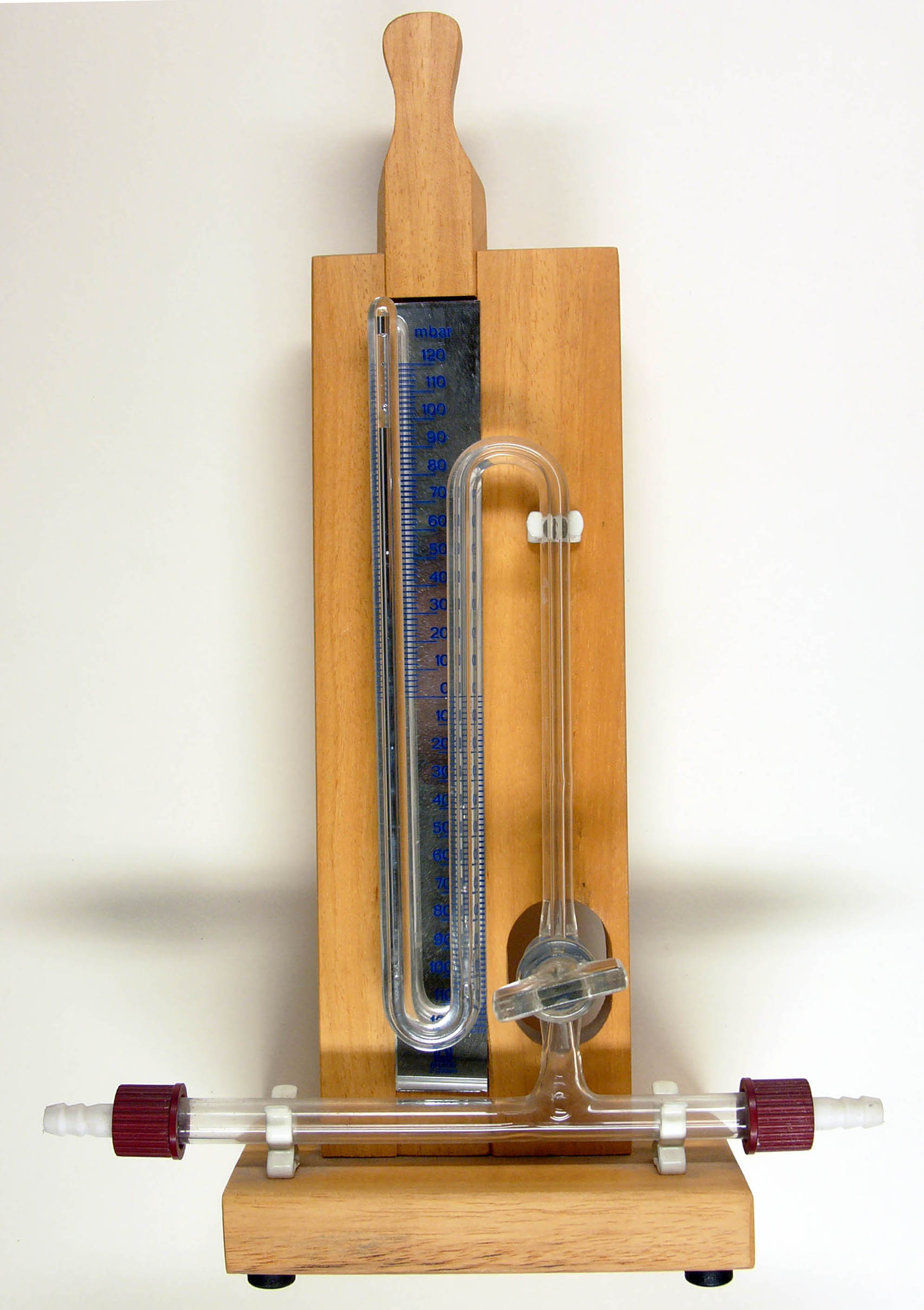
Mercury column

The SI unit for pressure is the pascal (Pa), equal to one newton per square metre (N/m^{2}, or kg·m^{−1}·s^{−2}). This name for the unit was added in 1971; before that, pressure in SI was expressed in newtons per square metre.

Other units of pressure, such as pounds per square inch (lbf/in^{2}) and bar, are also in common use. The CGS unit of pressure is the barye (Ba), equal to 1 dyn·cm^{−2}, or 0.1 Pa. Pressure is sometimes expressed in grams-force or kilograms-force per square centimetre ("g/cm^{2}" or "kg/cm^{2}") and the like without properly identifying the force units. But using the names kilogram, gram, kilogram-force, or gram-force (or their symbols) as units of force is deprecated in SI. The technical atmosphere (symbol: at) is 1 kgf/cm^{2} (98.0665 kPa, or 14.223 psi).

Pressure is related to energy density and may be expressed in units such as joules per cubic metre (J/m^{3}, which is equal to Pa). Mathematically:
$$p = \frac{F \cdot \text{distance}}{A \cdot \text{distance}} = \frac{\text{work}}{\text{volume}} = \frac{\text{energy (J)}}{\text{volume }(\text{m}^3)}.$$

Some meteorologists prefer the hectopascal (hPa) for atmospheric air pressure, which is equivalent to the older unit millibar (mbar). Similar pressures are given in kilopascals (kPa) in most other fields, except aviation where the hecto- prefix is commonly used. The inch of mercury is still used in the United States. Some oceanographers express underwater pressure in decibars (dbar) because pressure in the ocean increases by approximately one decibar per metre depth.

The standard atmosphere (atm) is an established constant. It is approximately equal to typical air pressure at Earth mean sea level and is defined as 101325 Pa (IUPAC recommends the value 100000 Pa, but prior to 1982 the value 101325 Pa (= 1 atm) was usually used).

Because pressure is commonly measured by its ability to displace a column of liquid in a manometer, pressures are often expressed as a depth of a particular fluid (e.g., centimetres of water, millimetres of mercury or inches of mercury). The most common choices are mercury (Hg) and water; water is nontoxic and readily available, while mercury's high density allows a shorter column (and so a smaller manometer) to be used to measure a given pressure. The pressure exerted by a column of liquid of height h and density ρ is given by the hydrostatic pressure equation p = ρgh, where g is the gravitational acceleration. Fluid density and local gravity can vary from one reading to another depending on local factors, so the height of a fluid column does not define pressure precisely.

When millimetres of mercury (or inches of mercury) are quoted today, these units are not based on a physical column of mercury; rather, they have been given precise definitions that can be expressed in terms of SI units. One millimetre of mercury is approximately equal to one torr. The water-based units still depend on the density of water, a measured, rather than defined, quantity. These manometric units are still encountered in many fields. Blood pressure is measured in millimetres (or centimetres) of mercury in most of the world, and lung pressures in centimetres of water are still common.

Underwater divers use the metre sea water (msw or MSW) and foot sea water (fsw or FSW) units of pressure, and these are the units for pressure gauges used to measure pressure exposure in diving chambers and personal decompression computers.

Gauge pressure is often given in units with "g" appended, e.g. "kPag", "barg" or "psig", and units for measurements of absolute pressure are sometimes given a suffix of "a", for example "kPaa", "psia". However, the US National Institute of Standards and Technology recommends that, to avoid confusion, any modifiers be instead applied to the quantity being measured rather than the unit of measure. For example, "p_{g} = 100 psi" rather than "p = 100 psig".

Differential pressure is expressed in units with "d" appended; this type of measurement is useful when considering sealing performance or whether a valve will open or close.

Presently or formerly popular pressure units include the following:

- atmosphere (atm)
- manometric units:
  - centimetre, inch, millimetre (torr) and micrometre (mTorr, micron) of mercury,
  - height of equivalent column of water, including millimetre (mm H_{2}O), centimetre (cm H_{2}O), metre, inch (in. WC), and foot of water;
- imperial and customary units:
  - kip, short ton-force, long ton-force, pound-force, ounce-force, and poundal per square inch,
  - short ton-force and long ton-force per square inch,
  - fsw (feet sea water) used in underwater diving, particularly in connection with diving pressure exposure and decompression;
- non-SI metric units:
  - bar, decibar, millibar,
    - msw (metres sea water), used in underwater diving, particularly in connection with diving pressure exposure and decompression,
  - kilogram-force, or kilopond, per square centimetre (technical atmosphere),
  - gram-force and tonne-force (metric ton-force) per square centimetre,
  - barye (dyne per square centimetre),
  - kilogram-force and tonne-force per square metre,
  - sthene per square metre (pieze).

=== Examples ===
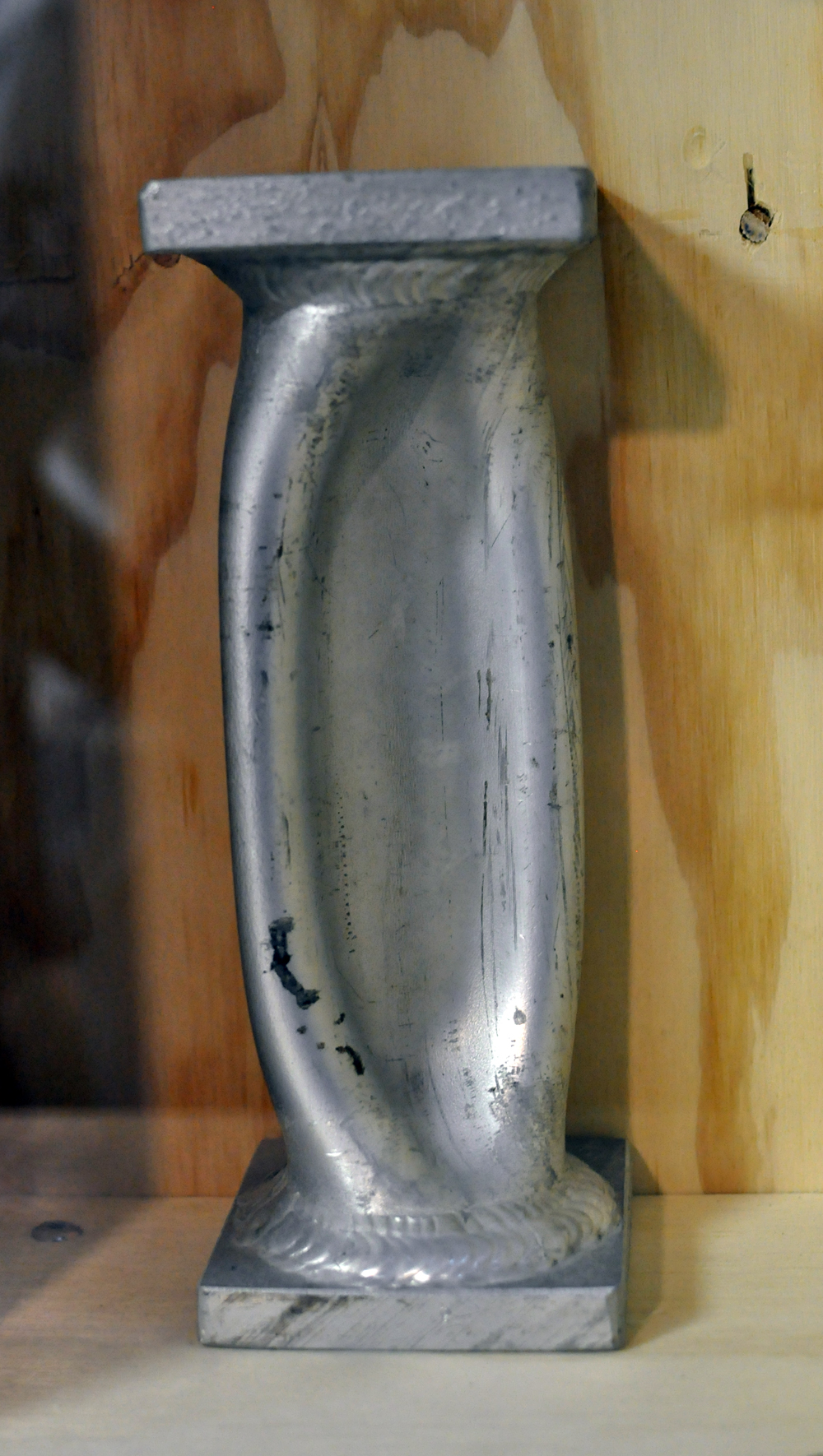
The effects of an external pressure of 700 bar on an aluminum cylinder with 5 mm (0.197 in) wall thickness

As an example of varying pressures, a finger can be pressed against a wall without making any lasting impression; however, the same finger pushing a thumbtack can easily damage the wall. Although the force applied to the surface is the same, the thumbtack applies more pressure because the point concentrates that force into a smaller area. Pressure is transmitted to solid boundaries or across arbitrary sections of fluid normal to these boundaries or sections at every point. Unlike stress, pressure is defined as a scalar quantity. The negative gradient of pressure is called the force density.

Another example is a knife. If the flat edge is used, force is distributed over a larger surface area resulting in less pressure, and it will not cut. Whereas using the sharp edge, which has less surface area, results in greater pressure, and so the knife cuts smoothly. This is one example of a practical application of pressure.

For gases, pressure is sometimes measured not as an absolute pressure, but relative to atmospheric pressure; such measurements are called gauge pressure. An example of this is the air pressure in an automobile tire, which might be said to be "220 kPa (32 psi)", but is actually 220 kPa (32 psi) above atmospheric pressure. Since atmospheric pressure at sea level is about 100 kPa (14.7 psi), the absolute pressure in the tire is therefore about 320 kPa (46 psi). In technical work, this is written "a gauge pressure of 220 kPa (32 psi)".

Where space is limited, such as on pressure gauges, name plates, graph labels, and table headings, the use of a modifier in parentheses, such as "kPa (gauge)" or "kPa (absolute)", is permitted. In non-SI technical work, a gauge pressure of 32 psi (220 kPa) is sometimes written as "32 psig", and an absolute pressure as "32 psia", though the other methods explained above that avoid attaching characters to the unit of pressure are preferred.

Gauge pressure is the relevant measure of pressure wherever one is interested in the stress on storage vessels and the plumbing components of fluidics systems. However, whenever equation-of-state properties, such as densities or changes in densities, must be calculated, pressures must be expressed in terms of their absolute values. For instance, if the atmospheric pressure is 100 kPa (15 psi), a gas (such as helium) at 200 kPa (29 psi) (gauge) (300 kPa or 44 psi [absolute]) is 50% denser than the same gas at 100 kPa (15 psi) (gauge) (200 kPa or 29 psi [absolute]). Focusing on gauge values, one might erroneously conclude the first sample had twice the density of the second one.

=== Scalar nature ===
In a static gas, the gas as a whole does not appear to move. The individual molecules of the gas, however, are in constant random motion. Because there are an extremely large number of molecules and because the motion of the individual molecules is random in every direction, no motion is detected. When the gas is at least partially confined (that is, not free to expand rapidly), the gas will exhibit a hydrostatic pressure. This confinement can be achieved with either a physical container, or in the gravitational well of a large mass, such as a planet, otherwise known as atmospheric pressure.

In the case of planetary atmospheres, the pressure-gradient force of the gas pushing outwards from higher pressure, lower altitudes to lower pressure, higher altitudes is balanced by the gravitational force, preventing the gas from diffusing into outer space and maintaining hydrostatic equilibrium.

In a physical container, the pressure of the gas originates from the molecules colliding with the walls of the container. The walls of the container can be anywhere inside the gas, and the force per unit area (the pressure) is the same. If the "container" is shrunk down to a very small point (becoming less true as the atomic scale is approached), the pressure will still have a single value at that point. Therefore, pressure is a scalar quantity, not a vector quantity. It has magnitude but no direction sense associated with it. Pressure force acts in all directions at a point inside a gas. At the surface of a gas, the pressure force acts perpendicular (at right angle) to the surface.

A closely related quantity is the stress tensor σ, which relates the vector force $\mathbf{F}$ to the vector area $\mathbf{A}$ via the linear relation $\mathbf{F} = \sigma\mathbf{A}$.

This tensor may be expressed as the sum of the viscous stress tensor minus the hydrostatic pressure. The negative of the stress tensor is sometimes called the pressure tensor, but in the following, the term "pressure" will refer only to the scalar pressure.

According to the theory of general relativity, pressure increases the strength of a gravitational field (see stress–energy tensor) and so adds to the mass-energy cause of gravity. This effect is unnoticeable at everyday pressures but is significant in neutron stars, although it has not been experimentally tested.

== Types ==
=== Fluid pressure ===
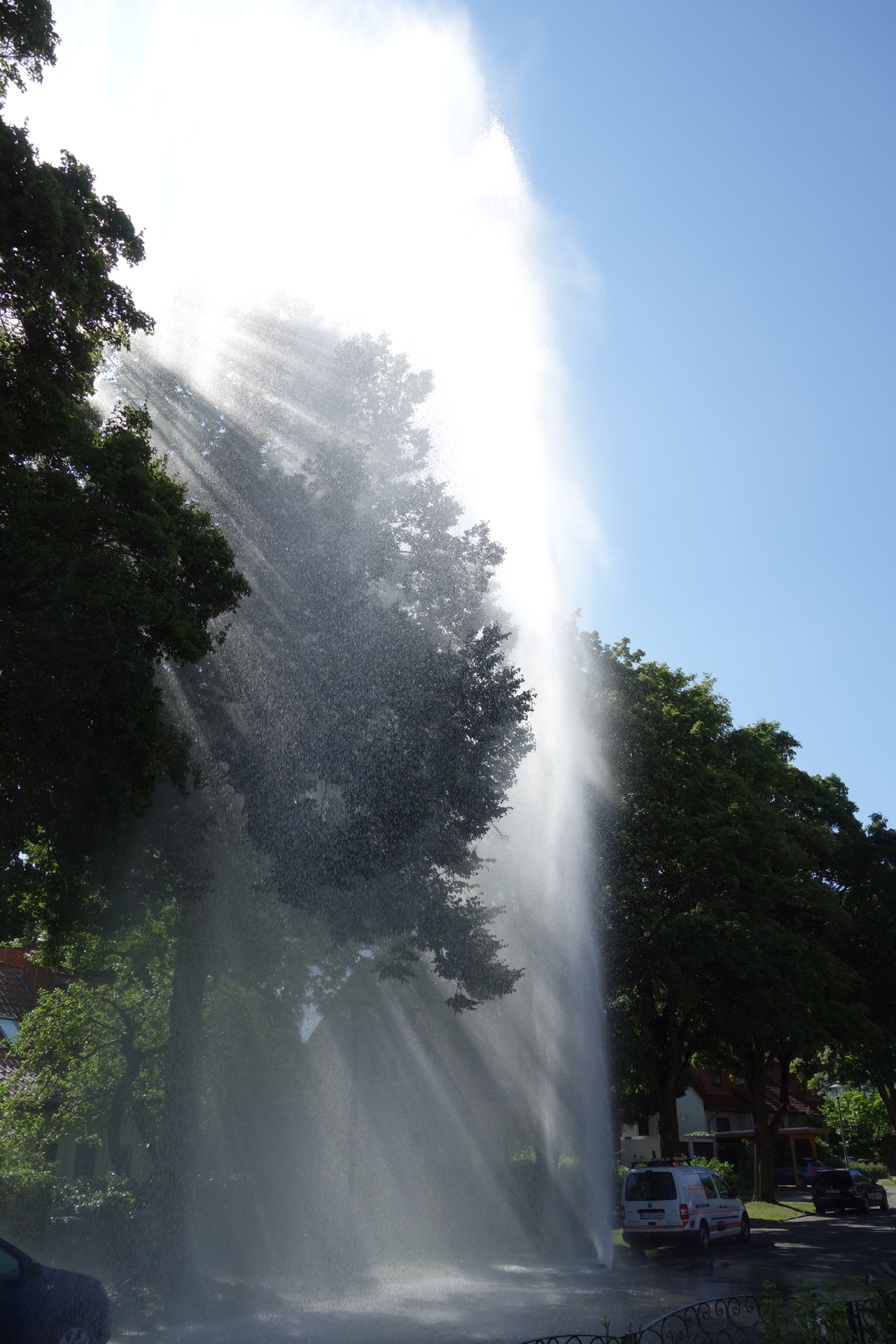
Water escapes at high speed from a damaged hydrant that contains water at high pressure (due to high pressure of the water it behaves like it is sprayed)

Fluid pressure is most often the compressive stress at some point within a fluid. (The term fluid refers to both liquids and gases – see below for more information specifically about liquid pressure or gas pressure.) Fluid pressure occurs in one of two situations:

- An open condition, called "open channel flow", e.g. the ocean, a swimming pool, or the atmosphere.
- A closed condition, called "closed conduit", e.g. a water line or gas line.

Pressure in open conditions usually can be approximated as the pressure in "static" or non-moving conditions (even in the ocean where there are waves and currents), because the motions create only negligible changes in the pressure. Such conditions conform with principles of fluid statics. The pressure at any given point of a non-moving (static) fluid is called the hydrostatic pressure.

Closed bodies of fluid are either "static", when the fluid is not moving, or "dynamic", when the fluid can move as in either a pipe or by compressing an air gap in a closed container. The pressure in closed conditions conforms with the principles of fluid dynamics.

The concepts of fluid pressure are predominantly attributed to the discoveries of Blaise Pascal and Daniel Bernoulli. Bernoulli's equation can be used in almost any situation to determine the pressure at any point in a fluid. The equation makes some assumptions about the fluid, such as the fluid being ideal and incompressible. An ideal fluid is a fluid in which there is no friction, it is inviscid (zero viscosity). The equation for all points of a system filled with a constant-density fluid is
$$\frac{p}{\gamma} + \frac{v^2}{2g} + z = \mathrm{const},$$

where:

- p, pressure of the fluid,
- ${\gamma}$ = ρg, density × acceleration of gravity is the (volume-) specific weight of the fluid,
- v, velocity of the fluid,
- g, acceleration of gravity,
- z, elevation,
- $\frac{p}{\gamma}$, pressure head,
- $\frac{v^2}{2g}$, velocity head.

==== Applications ====
- Hydraulic brakes
- Artesian well
- Blood pressure
- Hydraulic head
- Plant cell turgidity
- Pythagorean cup
- Pressure washing

=== Explosion or deflagration pressures ===
Explosion or deflagration pressures are the result of the ignition of explosive gases, mists, dust/air suspensions, in unconfined and confined spaces.

=== Negative pressures ===
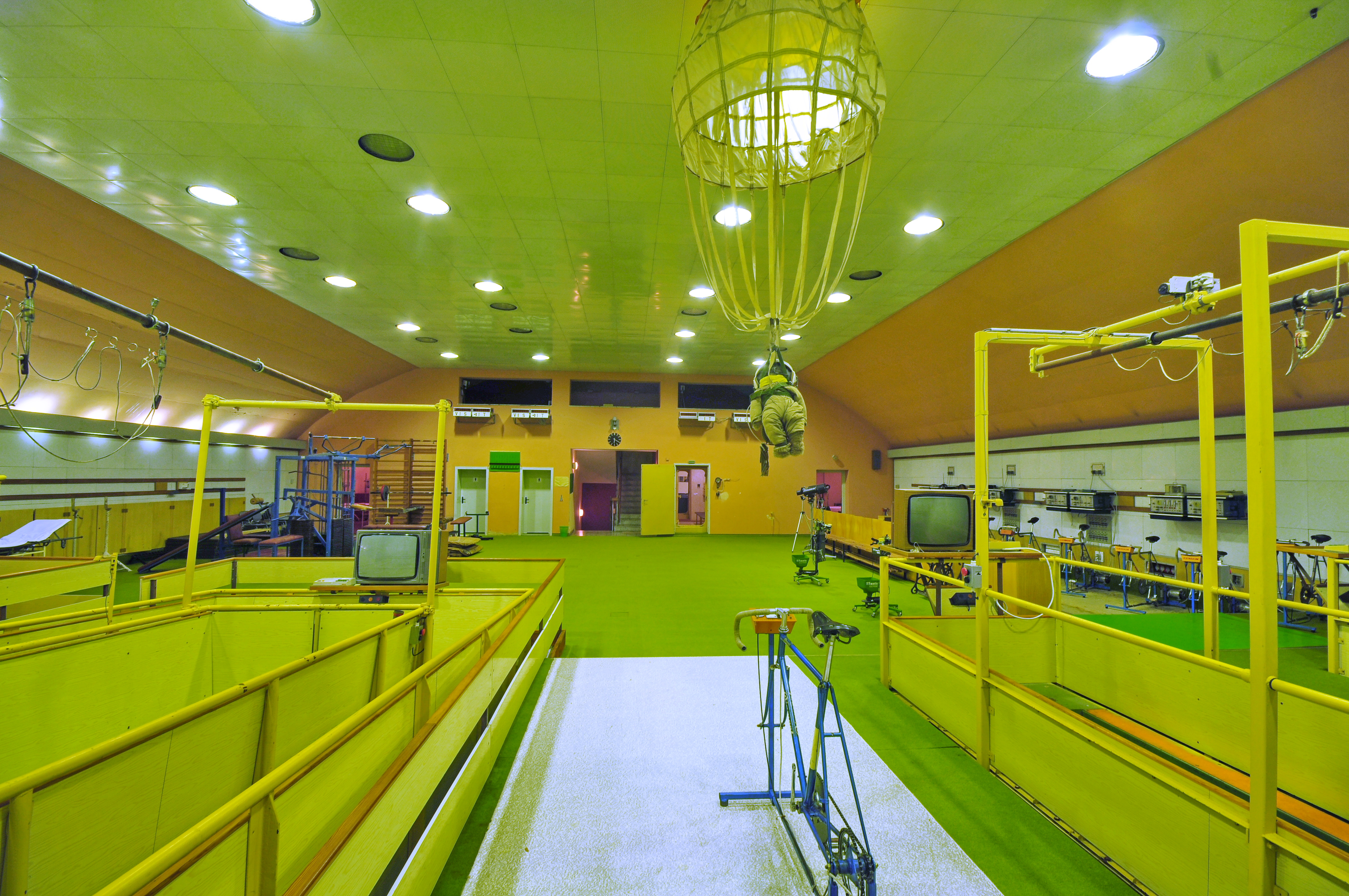
Low-pressure chamber in Bundesleistungszentrum Kienbaum, Germany

While pressures are, in general, positive, there are several situations in which negative pressures may be encountered:

- When dealing in relative (gauge) pressures. For instance, an absolute pressure of 80 kPa may be described as a gauge pressure of −21 kPa (i.e., 21 kPa below an atmospheric pressure of 101 kPa). For example, abdominal decompression is an obstetric procedure during which negative gauge pressure is applied intermittently to a pregnant woman's abdomen.
- Negative absolute pressures are possible. They are effectively tension, and both bulk solids and bulk liquids can be put under negative absolute pressure by pulling on them. Microscopically, the molecules in solids and liquids have attractive interactions that overpower the thermal kinetic energy, so some tension can be sustained. Thermodynamically, however, a bulk material under negative pressure is in a metastable state, and it is especially fragile in the case of liquids where the negative pressure state is similar to superheating and is easily susceptible to cavitation. In certain situations, the cavitation can be avoided and negative pressures sustained indefinitely, for example, liquid mercury has been observed to sustain up to −425 atm in clean glass containers. Negative liquid pressures are thought to be involved in the ascent of sap in plants taller than 10 m (the atmospheric pressure head of water).
- The Casimir effect can create a small attractive force due to interactions with vacuum energy; this force is sometimes termed "vacuum pressure" (not to be confused with the negative gauge pressure of a vacuum).
- For non-isotropic stresses in rigid bodies, depending on how the orientation of a surface is chosen, the same distribution of forces may have a component of positive stress along one surface normal, with a component of negative stress acting along another surface normal. The pressure is then defined as the average of the three principal stresses.
  - The stresses in an electromagnetic field are generally non-isotropic, with the stress normal to one surface element (the normal stress) being negative, and positive for surface elements perpendicular to this.
- In cosmology, dark energy creates a very small yet cosmically significant amount of negative pressure, which accelerates the expansion of the universe.

=== Stagnation pressure ===
Stagnation pressure is the pressure a fluid exerts when it is forced to stop moving. Consequently, although a fluid moving at higher speed will have a lower static pressure, it may have a higher stagnation pressure when forced to a standstill. Static pressure and stagnation pressure are related by:
$$p_{0} = \frac{1}{2}\rho v^2 + p$$
where

- $p_0$ is the stagnation pressure,
- $\rho$ is the density,
- $v$ is the flow velocity,
- $p$ is the static pressure.

The pressure of a moving fluid can be measured using a Pitot tube, or one of its variations such as a Kiel probe or Cobra probe, connected to a manometer. Depending on where the inlet holes are located on the probe, it can measure static pressures or stagnation pressures.

=== Surface pressure and surface tension ===
There is a two-dimensional analog of pressure – the lateral force per unit length applied on a line perpendicular to the force.

Surface pressure is denoted by π:
$$\pi = \frac{F}{l}$$

clarification: the expression does not evaluate to the constant pi (π).

and shares many similar properties with three-dimensional pressure. Properties of surface chemicals can be investigated by measuring pressure/area isotherms, as the two-dimensional analog of Boyle's law, πA = k, at constant temperature.

Surface tension is another example of surface pressure, but with a reversed sign, because "tension" is the opposite to "pressure".

=== Gas pressure ===
In an ideal gas, molecules have no volume and do not interact. According to the ideal gas law, pressure varies linearly with temperature and quantity, and inversely with volume:
$$p = \frac{nRT}{V},$$
where:

- p is the absolute pressure of the gas,
- n is the amount of substance,
- T is the absolute temperature,
- V is the volume,
- R is the ideal gas constant.

Real gases exhibit a more complex dependence on the variables of state.

=== Vapour pressure ===
Vapour pressure is the pressure of a vapour in thermodynamic equilibrium with its condensed phases in a closed system. All liquids and solids have a tendency to evaporate into a gaseous form, and all gases have a tendency to condense back to their liquid or solid form.

The atmospheric pressure boiling point of a liquid (also known as the normal boiling point) is the temperature at which the vapor pressure equals the ambient atmospheric pressure. With any incremental increase in that temperature, the vapor pressure becomes sufficient to overcome atmospheric pressure and lift the liquid to form vapour bubbles inside the bulk of the substance. Bubble formation deeper in the liquid requires a higher pressure, and therefore higher temperature, because the fluid pressure increases above the atmospheric pressure as the depth increases.

The vapor pressure that a single component in a mixture contributes to the total pressure in the system is called partial vapor pressure.

=== Liquid pressure ===
When a person swims under the water, water pressure is felt acting on the person's eardrums. The deeper that person swims, the greater the pressure. The pressure felt is due to the weight of the water above the person. As someone swims deeper, there is more water above the person and therefore greater pressure. The pressure a liquid exerts depends on its depth.

Liquid pressure also depends on the density of the liquid. If someone was submerged in a liquid more dense than water, the pressure would be correspondingly greater. Thus, we can say that the depth, density and liquid pressure are directly proportionate. The pressure in a liquid of uniform density is represented by the following formula:
$$p = \rho gh,$$
where:

- p is liquid pressure,
- ρ is density of the liquid,
- g is the acceleration due to gravity,
- h is depth within the liquid.

Another way of saying the same formula is the following:
$$p = \text{density} \times \text{gravitational acceleration} \times \text{depth}.$$

Derivation of this equation
This is derived from the definitions of pressure and weight density. Consider an area at the bottom of a vessel of liquid. The weight of the column of liquid directly above this area produces pressure. From the definition

$$\text{weight density} = \frac{\text{weight}}{\text{volume}}$$
we can express this weight of liquid as
$$\text{weight} = \text{weight density} \times \text{volume},$$
where the volume of the column is simply the area multiplied by the depth. Then we have
$$\text{pressure} = \frac{\text{force}}{\text{area}} = \frac{\text{weight}}{\text{area}} = \frac{\text{weight density} \times \text{volume}}{\text{area}},$$
$$\text{pressure} = \frac{\text{weight density} \times \text{(area} \times \text{depth)}}{\text{area}}.$$

With the "area" in the numerator and the "area" in the denominator canceling each other out, we are left with
$$\text{pressure} = \text{weight density} \times \text{depth}.$$

Written with symbols, this is our original equation:
$$p = \rho gh.$$

The pressure a liquid exerts against the sides and bottom of a container depends on the density and the depth of the liquid. If atmospheric pressure is neglected, liquid pressure against the bottom is twice as great at twice the depth; at three times the depth, the liquid pressure is threefold; etc. Or, if the liquid is two or three times as dense, the liquid pressure is correspondingly two or three times as great for any given depth. Liquids are practically incompressible – that is, their volume can hardly be changed by pressure (water volume decreases by only 50 millionths of its original volume for each atmospheric increase in pressure). Thus, except for small changes produced by temperature, the density of a particular liquid is practically the same at all depths.

Atmospheric pressure pressing on the surface of a liquid must be taken into account when trying to discover the total pressure acting on a liquid. The total pressure of a liquid, then, is ρgh plus the pressure of the atmosphere. When this distinction is important, the term total pressure is used. Otherwise, discussions of liquid pressure refer to pressure without regard to the normally ever-present atmospheric pressure.

The pressure does not depend on the amount of liquid present. Volume is not the important factor – depth is. The average water pressure acting against a dam depends on the average depth of the water and not on the volume of water held back. For example, a wide but shallow lake with a depth of 3 m (10 ft) exerts only half the average pressure that a small 6 m (20 ft) deep pond does. (The total force applied to the longer dam will be greater, due to the greater total surface area for the pressure to act upon. But for a given 5-foot (1.5 m)-wide section of each dam, the 10 ft (3.0 m) deep water will apply one quarter the force of 20 ft (6.1 m) deep water). A person will feel the same pressure whether their head is dunked a metre beneath the surface of the water in a small pool or to the same depth in the middle of a large lake.

If four interconnected vases contain different amounts of water but are all filled to equal depths, then a fish with its head dunked a few centimetres under the surface will be acted on by water pressure that is the same in any of the vases. If the fish swims a few centimetres deeper, the pressure on the fish will increase with depth and be the same no matter which vase the fish is in. If the fish swims to the bottom, the pressure will be greater, but it makes no difference which vase it is in. All vases are filled to equal depths, so the water pressure is the same at the bottom of each vase, regardless of its shape or volume. If water pressure at the bottom of a vase were greater than water pressure at the bottom of a neighboring vase, the greater pressure would force water sideways and then up the neighboring vase to a higher level until the pressures at the bottom were equalized. Pressure is depth dependent, not volume dependent, so there is a reason that water seeks its own level.

Restating this as an energy equation, the energy per unit volume in an ideal, incompressible liquid is constant throughout its vessel. At the surface of a stationary liquid in a vessel gravitational potential energy is large but liquid pressure is low. At the bottom of the vessel, all the gravitational potential energy is converted to pressure. The two energy components change linearly with the depth so the sum of pressure and gravitational potential energy per unit volume is constant throughout the volume of the fluid. The units of pressure are equivalent to energy per unit volume. (In the SI system of units, the pascal is equivalent to the joule per cubic metre.) Mathematically, it is described by Bernoulli's equation, where velocity head is zero and comparisons per unit volume in the vessel are
$$\frac{p}{\gamma} + z = \mathrm{const}.$$

Terms have the same meaning as in section Fluid pressure.

==== Direction of liquid pressure ====
An experimentally determined fact about liquid pressure is that it is exerted equally in all directions. If someone is submerged in water, no matter which way that person tilts their head, the person will feel the same amount of water pressure on their ears. Because a liquid can flow, this pressure is not only downward. Pressure is seen acting sideways when water spurts sideways from a leak in the side of an upright can. Pressure also acts upward, as demonstrated when someone tries to push a beach ball beneath the surface of the water. The bottom of a ball is pushed upward by water pressure (buoyancy).

When a liquid presses against a surface, there is a net force that is perpendicular to the surface. Although pressure does not have a specific direction, force does. A submerged triangular block has water forced against each point from many directions, but components of the force that are not perpendicular to the surface cancel each other out, leaving only a net perpendicular point. This is why liquid particles' velocity only alters in a normal component after they are collided to the container's wall. Likewise, if the collision site is a hole, water spurting from the hole in a bucket initially exits the bucket in a direction at right angles to the surface of the bucket in which the hole is located. Then it curves downward due to gravity. If there are three holes in a bucket (top, bottom, and middle), then the force vectors perpendicular to the inner container surface will increase with increasing depth – that is, a greater pressure at the bottom makes it so that the bottom hole will shoot water out the farthest. The force exerted by a fluid on a smooth surface is always at right angles to the surface. The speed of liquid out of the hole is $\scriptstyle \sqrt{2gh}$, where h is the depth below the free surface. As predicted by Torricelli's law this is the same speed the water (or anything else) would have if freely falling the same vertical distance h.

=== Kinematic pressure ===
$$P = \frac{p}{\rho_0}$$
is the kinematic pressure, where $p$ is the pressure and $\rho_0$ constant mass density. The SI unit of P is m^{2}/s^{2}. Kinematic pressure is used in the same manner as kinematic viscosity $\nu$ in order to compute the Navier–Stokes equation without explicitly showing the density $\rho_0$.

==== Navier–Stokes equation with kinematic quantities ====
$$\frac{\partial u}{\partial t} + (u \nabla) u = - \nabla P + \nu \nabla^2 u.$$

=== Generalized pressure ===
Generalized pressure is a physical concept that describes a thermodynamic ensemble of all factors that produce the same volumetric strain in a material. The concept was proposed in a 2022 paper published in Physical Review B by the Lei Li group at Sichuan University.

The framework is inspired by the equivalence principle in Einstein's theory of general relativity and aims to unify different sources of volumetric strain. Within this approach, different driving forces—such as chemical pressure and mechanical pressure—can be considered equivalent if they generate the same magnitude of volume strain.

Based on a stress–strain model, an equation of state under generalized pressure conditions was derived. The theory was further examined using the ternary semiconductor alloy Al_{x}Ga_{1−x}N as a case study. It was reported that the alloy system and its corresponding end-member materials exhibit identical phase-transition points when expressed in terms of generalized pressure.

== See also ==
- Boyle's law – Relation between gas pressure and volume
- Combined gas law – Combination of Charles', Boyle's and Gay-Lussac's gas laws
- Conversion of units – Comparison of various scales
- Critical point (thermodynamics) – Temperature and pressure point where phase boundaries disappear
- Dimensional analysis – Analysis of the dimensions of different physical quantities
- Dynamic pressure – Kinetic energy per unit volume of a fluid
- Electric potential – Line integral of the electric field
- Electron degeneracy pressure – Repulsive force in quantum mechanics
- High pressure – Great force distributed over a small area
- Hydraulics – Applied engineering involving liquids
- Hydrostatic stress – Component of mechanical stress without shear
- Internal pressure – Property of a thermodynamic system
- Kinetic theory – Understanding of gas properties in terms of molecular motion
- Microphone – Device that converts sound into an electrical signal
- Orders of magnitude (pressure) – Comparison of a wide range of pressures
- Partial pressure – Pressure of a component gas in a mixture
- Pressure measurement
- Pressure sensor
- Sound pressure – Local pressure deviation caused by a sound wave
- Static pressure – Term in fluid mechanics
- Timeline of temperature and pressure measurement technology
- Torricelli's law – Theorem in fluid mechanics
- Vacuum pump – Equipment generating a relative vacuum
- Vertical pressure variation – Variation in pressure as a function of elevation
- Water potential – Potential energy of water per unit volume relative to water in known conditions
