= Square mile =

Unit of area

square mile
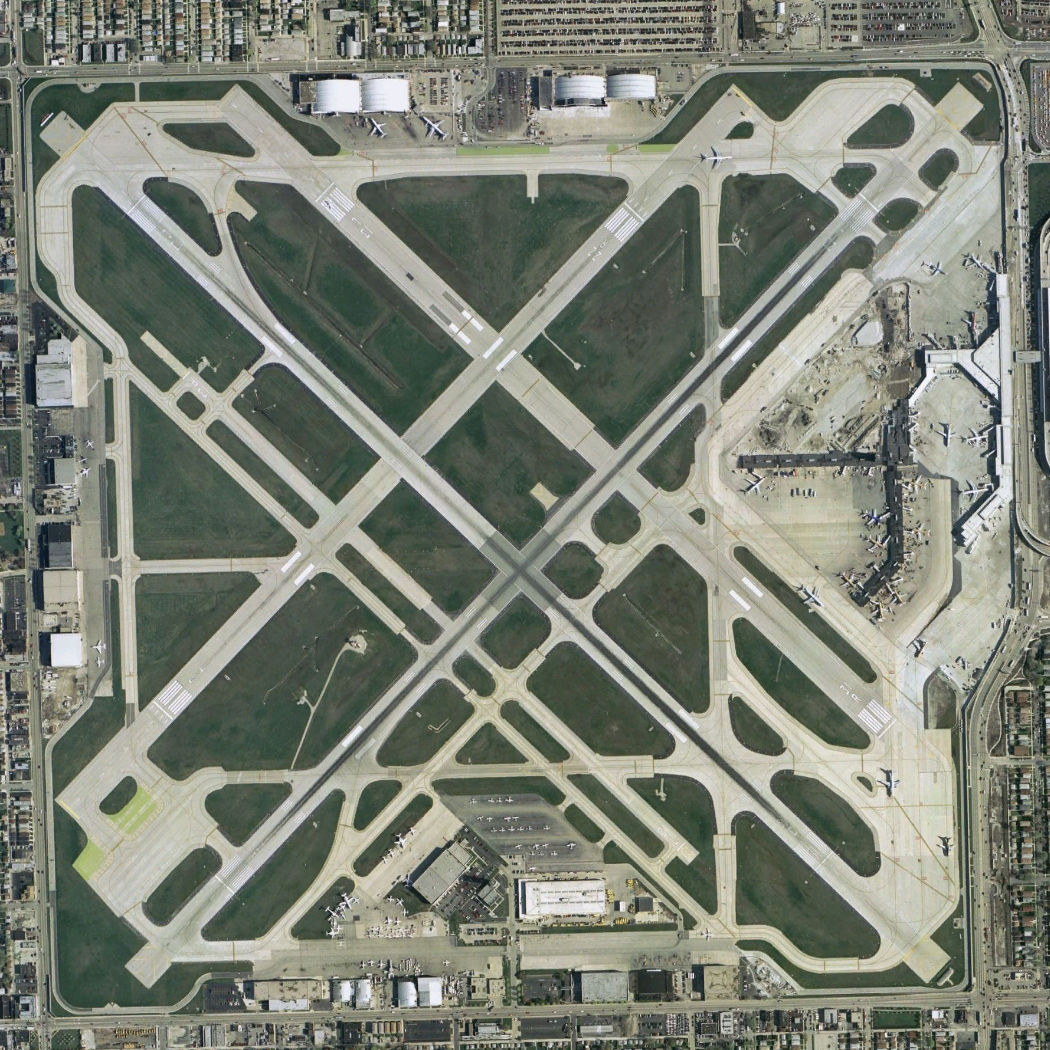
- Midway International Airport is about 650 acres (1.02 mi^{2}) in area.

General information
- Unit system: Imperial, United States customary units
- Unit of: area
- Symbol: mi^{2}, sq mi

Conversions
1 mi^{2} in ...	... is equal to ...
- Imperial/US: 4.0145×10^{9} sq in; 2.7878×10^{7} ft^{2}; 3.0976×10^{6} yd^{2}; 640 acres
- SI units: 2589988.110336 m^{2}; 2.589988110336 km^{2}

The square mile (abbreviated as sq mi and sometimes as mi^{2}) is an imperial and US unit of measure for area. One square mile is equal to the area of a square with each side measuring a length of one mile.

== Equivalents ==
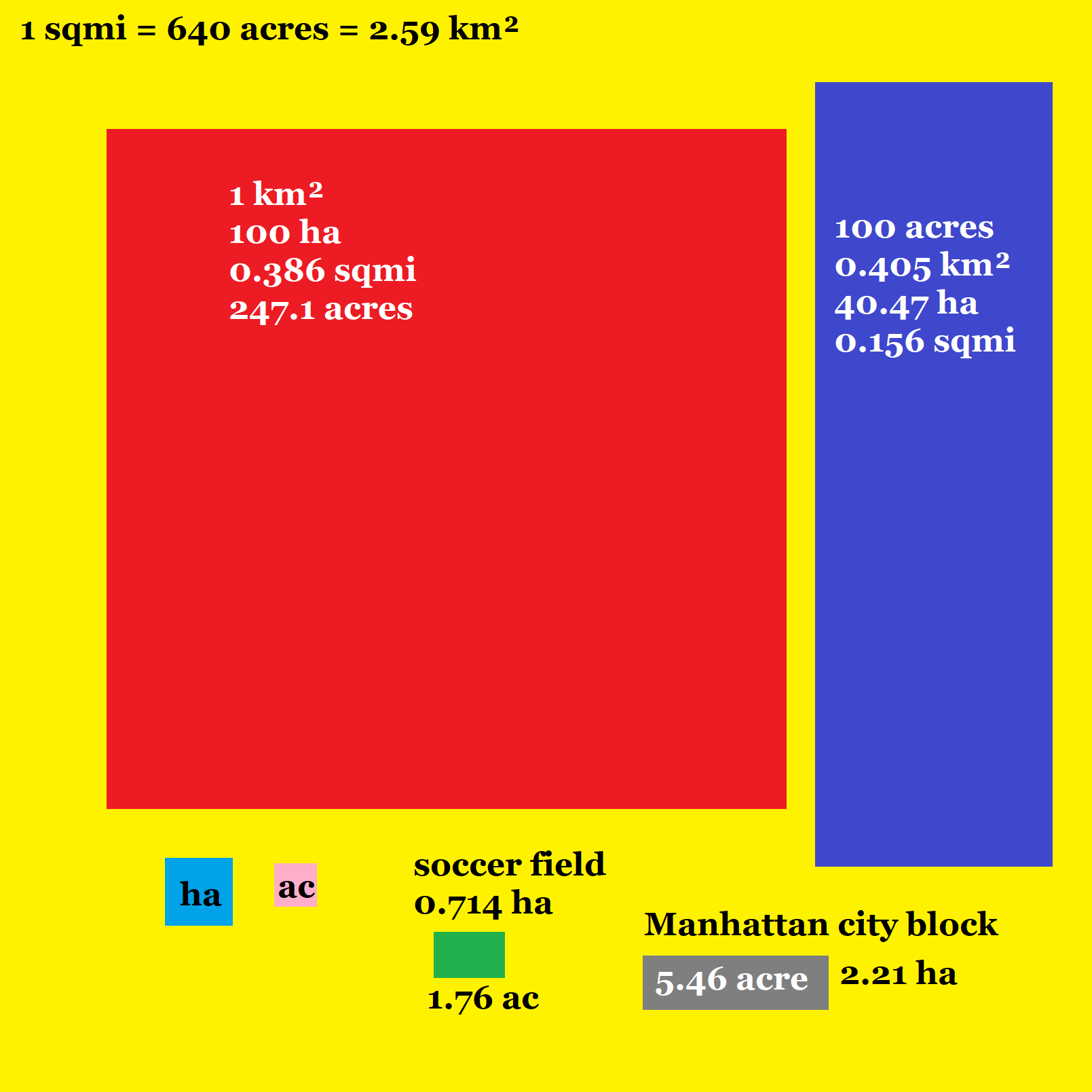
Various units of area, with square mile being represented as a yellow square

One square mile is equal to:

- about four billion square inches
- nearly 27.9 million square feet
- nearly 3.1 million square yards
- 2,560 roods
- 640 acres

One square mile is also equivalent to:

- nearly 2.59 million square meters
- nearly 25.9 billion square centimeters
- nearly 2.59 trillion square millimeters

== Similarly named units ==
=== Miles square ===
Square miles should not be confused with miles square, a square region with each side having a length of the value given. For example, a region which is 20 miles square (20 miles × 20 miles) has an area of 400 mi^{2}; a rectangle of measuring 10 miles × 40 miles also has an area of 400 mi^{2}, but is not 20 miles square.

=== Section ===
In the United States Public Land Survey System, "square mile" is an informal synonym for section.
