= Torr =

Traditional unit of pressure

torr
- Unit of: pressure
- Symbol: Torr
- Named after: Evangelista Torricelli
- Definition: 1/760 atm

Conversions
1 Torr in ...	... is equal to ...
- SI derived units: 133.3224 Pa
- British Gravitational System: 0.01933677 psi

The torr (symbol: Torr) is a unit of pressure based on an absolute scale, defined as exactly 1/760 of a standard atmosphere (101325 Pa). Thus one torr is exactly 101325/760 pascals (≈ 133.32 Pa).

Historically, one torr was intended to be the same as one "millimetre of mercury", but subsequent redefinitions of the two units made the torr marginally lower (by less than 0.000015%).

The torr is not part of the International System of Units (SI). Even so, it is often combined with the metric prefix milli to name one millitorr (mTorr), equal to 0.001 Torr.

The unit was named after Evangelista Torricelli, an Italian physicist and mathematician who discovered the principle of the barometer in 1644.

== Nomenclature and common errors ==
The unit name torr is written in lower case, while its symbol ("Torr") is always written with an uppercase initial; including in combinations with prefixes and other unit symbols, as in "mTorr" (millitorr) or "Torr⋅L/s" (torr-litres per second). The symbol (uppercase) should be used with prefix symbols (thus, mTorr and millitorr are correct, but mtorr and milliTorr are not).

The torr is sometimes incorrectly denoted by the symbol "T", which is the SI symbol for the tesla, the unit measuring the strength of a magnetic field. Although frequently encountered, the alternative spelling "Tor" is incorrect.

== History ==
Torricelli attracted considerable attention when he demonstrated the first mercury barometer to the general public. He is credited with giving the first modern explanation of atmospheric pressure. Scientists at the time were familiar with small fluctuations in height that occurred in barometers. When these fluctuations were explained as a manifestation of changes in atmospheric pressure, the science of meteorology was enabled.

Over time, 760 millimetres of mercury at 0 °C came to be regarded as the standard atmospheric pressure. In honour of Torricelli, the torr was defined as a unit of pressure equal to one millimetre of mercury at 0 °C. However, since the acceleration due to gravity – and thus the weight of a column of mercury – is a function of elevation and latitude (due to the rotation and non-sphericity of the Earth), this definition is imprecise and varies by location.

In 1954, the definition of the atmosphere was revised by the 10th General Conference on Weights and Measures to the currently accepted definition: one atmosphere is equal to 101325 pascals. The torr was then redefined as 1/760 of one atmosphere. This yields a precise definition that is unambiguous and independent of measurements of the density of mercury or the acceleration due to gravity on Earth.

== Manometric units of pressure ==
Manometric units are units such as millimetres of mercury or centimetres of water that depend on an assumed density of a fluid and an assumed acceleration due to gravity. The use of these units is discouraged. Nevertheless, manometric units are routinely used in medicine and physiology, and they continue to be used in areas as diverse as weather reporting and scuba diving.

== Conversion factors ==
The millimetre of mercury by definition is 133.322387415 Pa (13.5951 g/cm^{3} × 9.80665 m/s^{2} × 1 mm), which is approximated with known accuracies of density of mercury and standard gravity.

The torr is defined as 1/760 of one standard atmosphere, while the atmosphere is defined as 101325 pascals. Therefore, 1 Torr is equal to 101325/760 Pa. The decimal form of this fraction (133.3223̅6̅8̅4̅2̅1̅0̅5̅2̅6̅3̅1̅5̅7̅8̅9̅4̅7̅) is an infinitely long, periodically repeating decimal (repetend length: 18).

The relationship between the torr and the millimetre of mercury is:

- 1 Torr = 0.999999857533699... mmHg
- 1 mmHg = 1.000000142466321... Torr

The difference between one millimetre of mercury and one torr, as well as between one atmosphere (101.325 kPa) and 760 mmHg (101.3250144354 kPa), is less than one part in seven million (or less than 0.000015%). This small difference is negligible for all practical purposes.

In the European Union, the millimetre of mercury is defined as

1 mmHg = 133.322 Pa

hence

- 1 Torr = 1.000002763... mmHg
- 1 mmHg = 0.999997236... Torr

Other units of pressure include:

- The bar (symbol: bar), defined as 100 kPa exactly.
- The atmosphere (symbol: atm), defined as 101.325 kPa exactly.

These four pressure units are used in different settings. For example, the bar is used in meteorology to report atmospheric pressures. The torr is used in high-vacuum physics and engineering.

Pressure units
	Pascals	Bars	Standard atmospheres	Pounds per square inch	Millimetres of mercury	Inches of mercury	Technical atmospheres	Torrs
1 Pa	≡ 1 N/m^{2}	= 1×10^{−5} bar	≈ 9.86923×10^{−6} atm	≈ 1.45038×10^{−4} psi	≈ 7.50062×10^{−3} mmHg	≈ 2.95300×10^{−4} inHg	≈ 1.01972×10^{−5} kgf/cm^{2}	≈ 7.50062×10^{−3} Torr
1 bar	= 100000 Pa	≡ 100 000 N/m^{2}	≈ 0.98692 atm	≈ 14.5038 psi	≈ 750.062 mmHg	≈ 29.5300 inHg	≈ 1.01972 kgf/cm^{2}	≈ 750.062 Torr
1 atm	= 101325 Pa	= 1.01325 bar	≡ 101 325 N/m^{2}	≈ 14.6959 psi	≈ 760.000 mmHg	≈ 29.9213 inHg	≈ 1.03323 kgf/cm^{2}	= 760 Torr
1 psi	≈ 6894.76 Pa	≈ 0.06895 bar	≈ 0.06805 atm	≡ 1 lb/in^{2}	≈ 51.7149 mmHg	≈ 2.03602 inHg	≈ 0.07031 kgf/cm^{2}	≈ 51.7149 Torr
1 mmHg	≈ 133.322 Pa	≈ 1.33322×10^{−3} bar	≈ 1.31579×10^{−3} atm	≈ 0.01934 psi	≡ g_{n} × .001 m × 13595.1 kg/m^{3}	≈ 0.03937 inHg	≈ 1.35951×10^{−3} kgf/cm^{2}	≈ 1.00000 Torr
1 inHg	≈ 3386.39 Pa	≈ 0.03386 bar	≈ 0.03342 atm	≈ 0.49115 psi	= 25.4 mmHg	≡ g_{n} × .254 m × 13595.1 kg/m^{3}	≈ 0.0345316 kgf/cm^{2}	≈ 25.4000 Torr
1 kgf/cm^{2}	≈ 98066.5 Pa	≈ 0.98066 bar	≈ 0.96784 atm	≈ 14.2233 psi	≈ 735.559 mmHg	≈ 28.9590 inHg	≡ 1 kgf/cm^{2}	≈ 735.559 Torr
1 Torr	≈ 133.322 Pa	≈ 1.33322×10^{−3} bar	≈ 1.31579×10^{−3} atm	≈ 0.01934 psi	≈ 1.00000 mmHg	≈ 0.03937 inHg	≈ 1.35951×10^{−3} kgf/cm^{2}	≡ (101 325)/760 = (20 265)/172 N/m^{2}

== See also ==
- Atmosphere (unit)
- Centimetre of water
- Conversion of units
- Inch of mercury
- Outline of the metric system
- Pascal (unit)
- Pressure head
- Pressure
