= Millimetre of mercury =

Manometric unit of pressure

millimetre of mercury
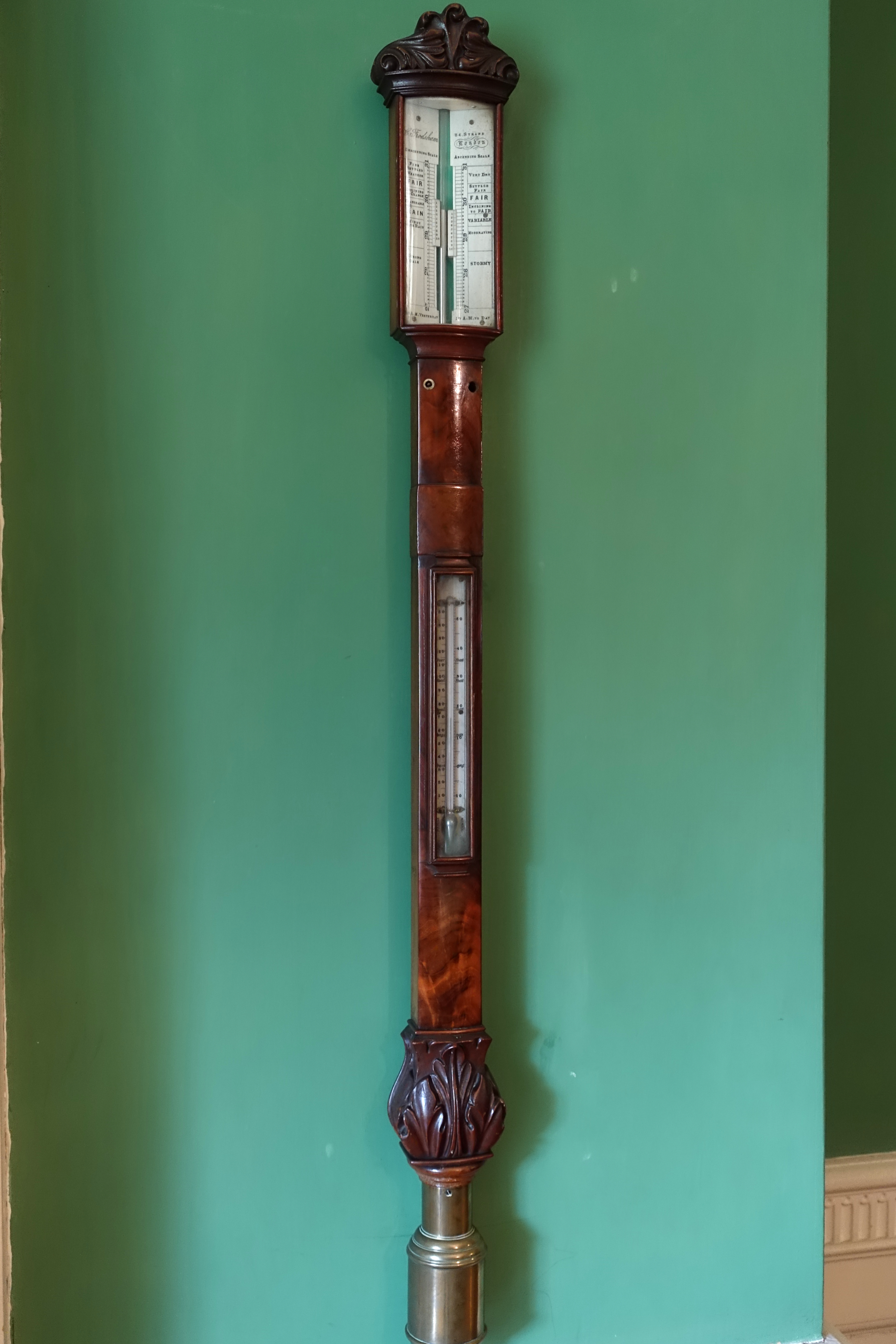
- Mercury barometer

General information
- Unit of: Pressure
- Symbol: mmHg, mm Hg

Conversions
1 mmHg in ...	... is equal to ...
- SI units: 133.322 Pa
- English Engineering units: 0.01933678 lbf/in^{2}

A millimetre of mercury is a manometric unit of pressure, formerly defined as the extra pressure generated by a column of mercury one millimetre high. Currently, it is defined as exactly 133.322387415 pascals, or approximately (Note: Although the two units are not equal, the relative difference (less than 0.000015%) is negligible for most practical uses.) 1 torr = 1/760 atmosphere = 101325/760 pascals. It is denoted mmHg or mm Hg.

Although not an SI unit, the millimetre of mercury is still often encountered in some fields; for example, it is still widely used in medicine, as demonstrated for example in the medical literature indexed in PubMed. For example, the U.S. and European guidelines on hypertension, in using millimeters of mercury for blood pressure, are reflecting the fact (common basic knowledge among health care professionals) that this is the usual unit of blood pressure in clinical medicine.

== Definition ==
The millimetre of mercury is defined as the pressure exerted by a column of mercury 1 millimetre high with a density of 13595.1 kg/m^{3} (approximate density at 0 °C or 32 °F) at standard gravity (9.80665 m/s^{2}), i.e. precisely 133.322387415 pascals.

1 mmHg = 1 mm × 13595.1 kg/m^{3} × 9.80665 m/s^{2} = 133.322387415 Pa (exactly)

The use of an actual column of mercury for precise measurement of pressure requires corrections for the actual gravity at given location (±0.44%) and the density of mercury at the actual temperature (−0.45% at 25 °C or 77 °F). If the top the column - the surface whose height is being measured - is exposed to some other fluid, that other fluid's temperature-dependent density must also be accounted for.

A torr is a similar unit defined as exactly 1/760 of a standard atmosphere (1 atm = 101325 Pa), i.e. 133.322368421… pascals.

1 Torr = 1/760 atm = 101325/760 Pa = 133.322368421… Pa

The torr is about one part in seven million or 0.000015% smaller than the millimetre of mercury; such difference is negligible for most practical uses.

Each millimetre of mercury can be divided into 1000 micrometres of mercury, denoted μmHg or simply microns.

== History ==
For much of human history, the pressure of gases like air was ignored, denied, or taken for granted, but as early as the 6th century BC, Greek philosopher Anaximenes of Miletus claimed that all things are made of air that is simply changed by varying levels of pressure. He could observe water evaporating, changing to a gas, and felt that this applied even to solid matter. More condensed air made colder, heavier objects, and expanded air made lighter, hotter objects. This was akin to how gases become less dense when warmer and more dense when cooler.

In the 17th century, Evangelista Torricelli conducted experiments with mercury that allowed him to measure the presence of air. He would dip a glass tube, closed at one end, into a bowl of mercury and raise the closed end up out of it, keeping the open end submerged. The weight of the mercury would pull it down, leaving a partial vacuum at the far end. This validated his belief that air/gas has mass, creating pressure on things around it. Previously, the more popular conclusion, even for Galileo, was that air was weightless and it is vacuum that provided force, as in a siphon. The discovery helped bring Torricelli to the conclusion:

We live submerged at the bottom of an ocean of the element air, which by unquestioned experiments is known to have weight.

This test, known as Torricelli's experiment, was essentially the first documented pressure gauge.

Blaise Pascal went farther, having his brother-in-law try the experiment at different altitudes on a mountain, and finding indeed that the farther down in the ocean of atmosphere, the higher the pressure.

Mercury manometers were the first accurate pressure gauges. They are less used today due to mercury's toxicity, the mercury column's sensitivity to temperature and local gravity, and the greater convenience of other instrumentation. They displayed the pressure difference between two fluids as a vertical difference between the mercury levels in two connected reservoirs.

An actual mercury column reading may be converted to more fundamental units of pressure by multiplying the difference in height between two mercury levels by the density of mercury and the local gravitational acceleration. Because the specific weight of mercury depends on temperature and surface gravity, both of which vary with local conditions, specific standard values for these two parameters were adopted. This resulted in defining a "millimetre of mercury" as the pressure exerted at the base of a column of mercury 1 millimetre high with a precise density of 13595.1 kg/m^{3} when the acceleration due to gravity is exactly 9.80665 m/s^{2}.

== Use in medicine and physiology ==
In medicine, pressure is still generally measured in millimetres of mercury. These measurements are in general given relative to the current atmospheric pressure: for example, a blood pressure of 120 mmHg, when the current atmospheric pressure is 760 mmHg, means 880 mmHg relative to perfect vacuum.

Routine pressure measurements in medicine include:

- Blood pressure, measured with a sphygmomanometer
- Intraocular pressure, with a tonometer
- Cerebrospinal fluid pressure
- Intracranial pressure
- Intramuscular pressure (compartment syndrome)
- Central venous pressure
- Pulmonary artery catheterization
- Mechanical ventilation

In physiology manometric units are used to measure Starling forces.

Pressure units
	Pascals	Bars	Standard atmospheres	Pounds per square inch	Millimetres of mercury	Inches of mercury	Technical atmospheres	Torrs
1 Pa	≡ 1 N/m^{2}	= 1×10^{−5} bar	≈ 9.86923×10^{−6} atm	≈ 1.45038×10^{−4} psi	≈ 7.50062×10^{−3} mmHg	≈ 2.95300×10^{−4} inHg	≈ 1.01972×10^{−5} kgf/cm^{2}	≈ 7.50062×10^{−3} Torr
1 bar	= 100000 Pa	≡ 100 000 N/m^{2}	≈ 0.98692 atm	≈ 14.5038 psi	≈ 750.062 mmHg	≈ 29.5300 inHg	≈ 1.01972 kgf/cm^{2}	≈ 750.062 Torr
1 atm	= 101325 Pa	= 1.01325 bar	≡ 101 325 N/m^{2}	≈ 14.6959 psi	≈ 760.000 mmHg	≈ 29.9213 inHg	≈ 1.03323 kgf/cm^{2}	= 760 Torr
1 psi	≈ 6894.76 Pa	≈ 0.06895 bar	≈ 0.06805 atm	≡ 1 lb/in^{2}	≈ 51.7149 mmHg	≈ 2.03602 inHg	≈ 0.07031 kgf/cm^{2}	≈ 51.7149 Torr
1 mmHg	≈ 133.322 Pa	≈ 1.33322×10^{−3} bar	≈ 1.31579×10^{−3} atm	≈ 0.01934 psi	≡ g_{n} × .001 m × 13595.1 kg/m^{3}	≈ 0.03937 inHg	≈ 1.35951×10^{−3} kgf/cm^{2}	≈ 1.00000 Torr
1 inHg	≈ 3386.39 Pa	≈ 0.03386 bar	≈ 0.03342 atm	≈ 0.49115 psi	= 25.4 mmHg	≡ g_{n} × .0254 m × 13595.1 kg/m^{3}	≈ 0.0345316 kgf/cm^{2}	≈ 25.4000 Torr
1 kgf/cm^{2}	≈ 98066.5 Pa	≈ 0.98066 bar	≈ 0.96784 atm	≈ 14.2233 psi	≈ 735.559 mmHg	≈ 28.9590 inHg	≡ 1 kgf/cm^{2}	≈ 735.559 Torr
1 Torr	≈ 133.322 Pa	≈ 1.33322×10^{−3} bar	≈ 1.31579×10^{−3} atm	≈ 0.01934 psi	≈ 1.00000 mmHg	≈ 0.03937 inHg	≈ 1.35951×10^{−3} kgf/cm^{2}	≡ (101 325)/760 = (20 265)/172 N/m^{2}

== See also ==
- Bar (unit)
- Centimetre or millimetre of water
- Inch of mercury
- Inch of water
- Pound per square inch
- Torr
