= Bar (unit) =

Unit of pressure equal to 100,000 Pa

bar
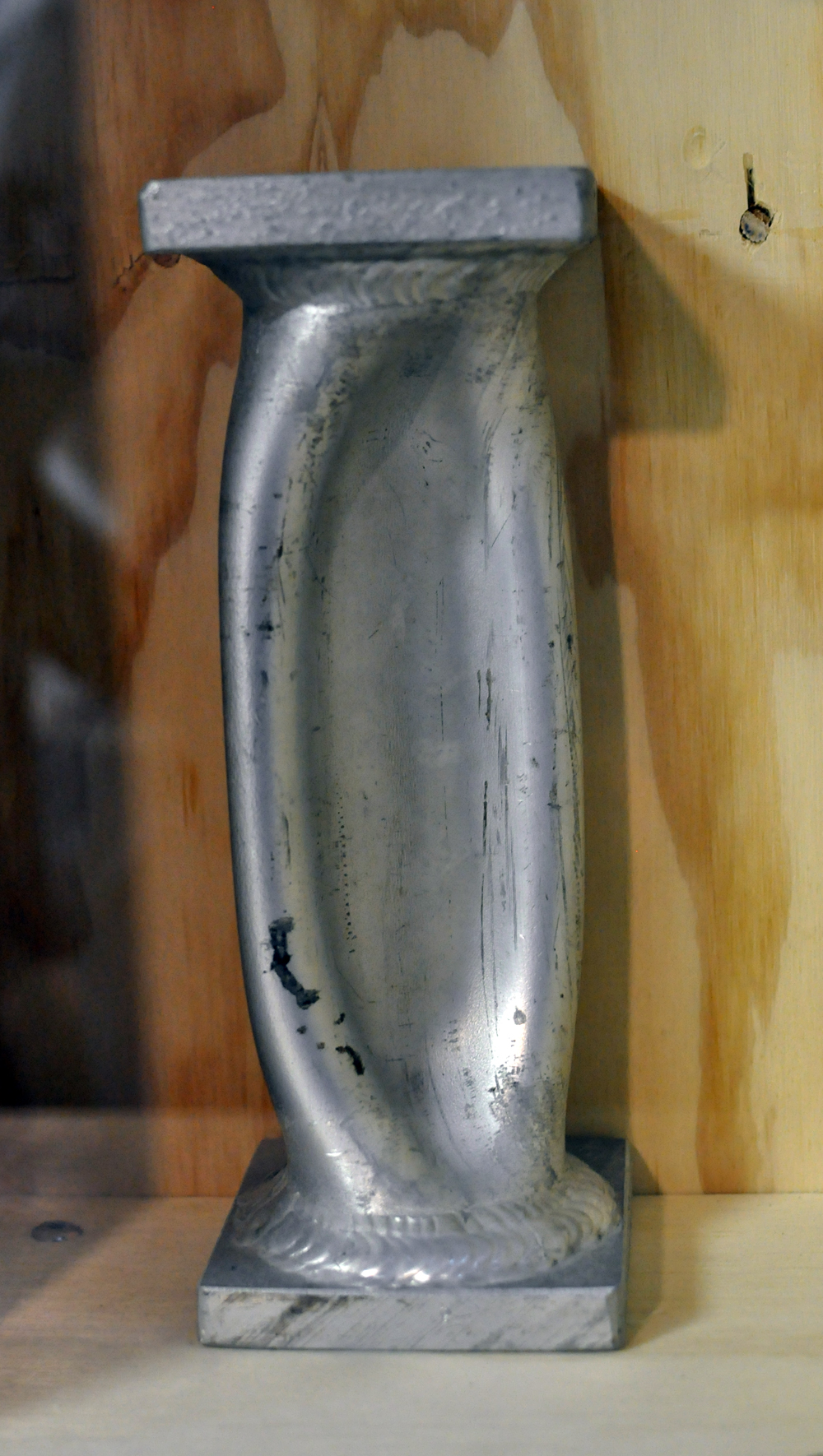
- An aluminium cylinder of wall thickness 5 millimetres (0.20 in) after an external pressure of 700 bar was applied to it

General information
- Unit system: metric system
- Unit of: pressure
- Symbol: bar

Conversions
1 bar in ...	... is equal to ...
- SI units: 100 kPa
- CGS units: 10^{6} Ba
- US customary units: 14.50377 psi
- Atmospheres: 0.986923 atm

The bar (symbol bar) is a metric unit of pressure defined as 100000 Pa (100 kPa or 1000 hPa), though not part of the International System of Units (SI). A pressure of 1 bar is slightly less than the average atmospheric pressure on Earth at sea level (approximately 1.013 bar). By the barometric formula, 1 bar is roughly the atmospheric pressure on Earth at an altitude of 111 metres at 15 °C.

The bar and the millibar (symbol mbar) were introduced by the Norwegian meteorologist Vilhelm Bjerknes, a founder of the modern practice of weather forecasting, with the bar defined as one megadyne per square centimetre.

The SI brochure lists the symbol and value for the bar but it is not an SI unit. The bar has been legally recognised in countries of the European Union since 2004. The US National Institute of Standards and Technology (NIST) deprecates its use except for "limited use in meteorology" and lists it as one of several units that "must not be introduced in fields where they are not presently used". The International Astronomical Union (IAU) also lists it under "Non-SI units and symbols whose continued use is deprecated".

Units derived from the bar include the megabar (symbol: Mbar), kilobar (symbol: kbar), decibar (symbol: dbar), centibar (symbol: cbar), and millibar (symbol: mbar). The microbar (symbol: μbar) is used in acoustics.

== Definition and conversion ==
The bar is defined using the SI derived unit, pascal: 1 bar ≡ 100000 Pa ≡ 100000 N/m^{2}.

Thus, 1 bar is equal to:

- 1000000 Ba (barye; in CGS units (this has also been called "bar"); and 1 bar is approximately equal to:
- 0.98692327 atm
- 14.503774 psi
- 29.529983 inHg
- 750.06158 mmHg
- 750.06168 Torr
- 1019.716 centimetres of water (cmH_{2}O) (1 bar approximately corresponds to the gauge pressure of water at a depth of 10 metres)

Conversion of bars to pascals:

microbar (μbar)	0.001 mbar		1 dyne/cm^{2}	0.1 Pa
millibar (mbar)	0.001 bar	100 Pa	1 hPa	0.1 kPa
bar		100 kPa	1000 hPa	0.1 MPa
kilobar (kbar)	1000 bar	100 MPa		0.1 GPa
megabar (Mbar)	1000 kbar	100 GPa		

Pressure units
	Pascals	Bars	Standard atmospheres	Pounds per square inch	Millimetres of mercury	Inches of mercury	Technical atmospheres	Torrs
1 Pa	≡ 1 N/m^{2}	= 1×10^{−5} bar	≈ 9.86923×10^{−6} atm	≈ 1.45038×10^{−4} psi	≈ 7.50062×10^{−3} mmHg	≈ 2.95300×10^{−4} inHg	≈ 1.01972×10^{−5} kgf/cm^{2}	≈ 7.50062×10^{−3} Torr
1 bar	= 100000 Pa	≡ 100 000 N/m^{2}	≈ 0.98692 atm	≈ 14.5038 psi	≈ 750.062 mmHg	≈ 29.5300 inHg	≈ 1.01972 kgf/cm^{2}	≈ 750.062 Torr
1 atm	= 101325 Pa	= 1.01325 bar	≡ 101 325 N/m^{2}	≈ 14.6959 psi	≈ 760.000 mmHg	≈ 29.9213 inHg	≈ 1.03323 kgf/cm^{2}	= 760 Torr
1 psi	≈ 6894.76 Pa	≈ 0.06895 bar	≈ 0.06805 atm	≡ 1 lb/in^{2}	≈ 51.7149 mmHg	≈ 2.03602 inHg	≈ 0.07031 kgf/cm^{2}	≈ 51.7149 Torr
1 mmHg	≈ 133.322 Pa	≈ 1.33322×10^{−3} bar	≈ 1.31579×10^{−3} atm	≈ 0.01934 psi	≡ g_{n} × .001 m × 13595.1 kg/m^{3}	≈ 0.03937 inHg	≈ 1.35951×10^{−3} kgf/cm^{2}	≈ 1.00000 Torr
1 inHg	≈ 3386.39 Pa	≈ 0.03386 bar	≈ 0.03342 atm	≈ 0.49115 psi	= 25.4 mmHg	≡ g_{n} × .0254 m × 13595.1 kg/m^{3}	≈ 0.0345316 kgf/cm^{2}	≈ 25.4000 Torr
1 kgf/cm^{2}	≈ 98066.5 Pa	≈ 0.98066 bar	≈ 0.96784 atm	≈ 14.2233 psi	≈ 735.559 mmHg	≈ 28.9590 inHg	≡ 1 kgf/cm^{2}	≈ 735.559 Torr
1 Torr	≈ 133.322 Pa	≈ 1.33322×10^{−3} bar	≈ 1.31579×10^{−3} atm	≈ 0.01934 psi	≈ 1.00000 mmHg	≈ 0.03937 inHg	≈ 1.35951×10^{−3} kgf/cm^{2}	≡ (101 325)/760 = (20 265)/172 N/m^{2}

== Origin ==
The word bar has its origin in the Ancient Greek word βάρος (baros), meaning weight. The unit's official symbol is bar; the earlier symbol b is deprecated and conflicts with the uses of b denoting the unit barn or bit, but it is still encountered, especially as mb (rather than the proper mbar) to denote the millibar. Between 1793 and 1795, the word bar was used for a unit of mass (equal to the modern tonne) in an early version of the metric system.

== Usage ==
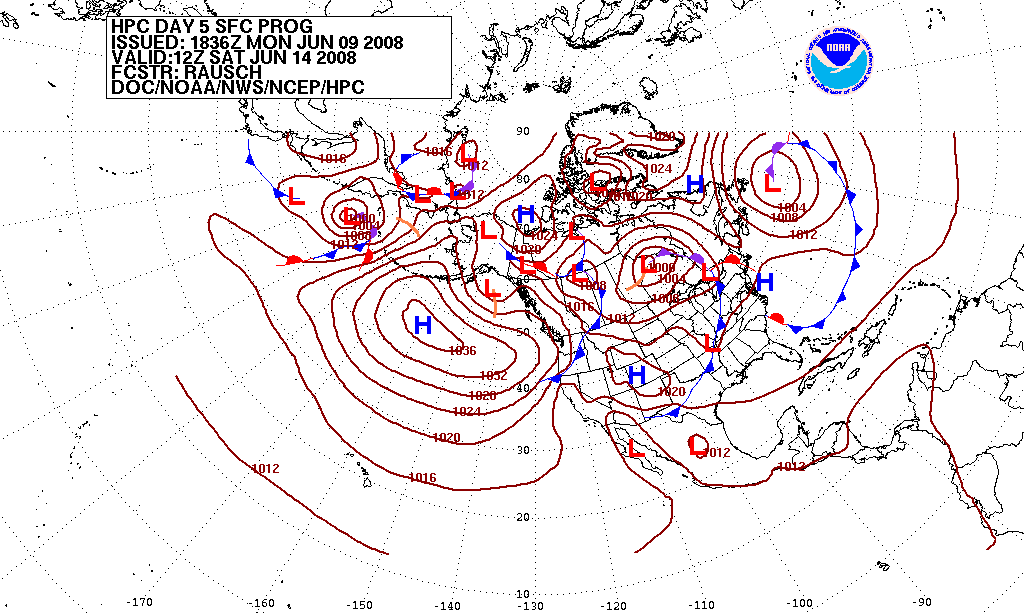
Map showing atmospheric pressure in millibar, or hectopascals

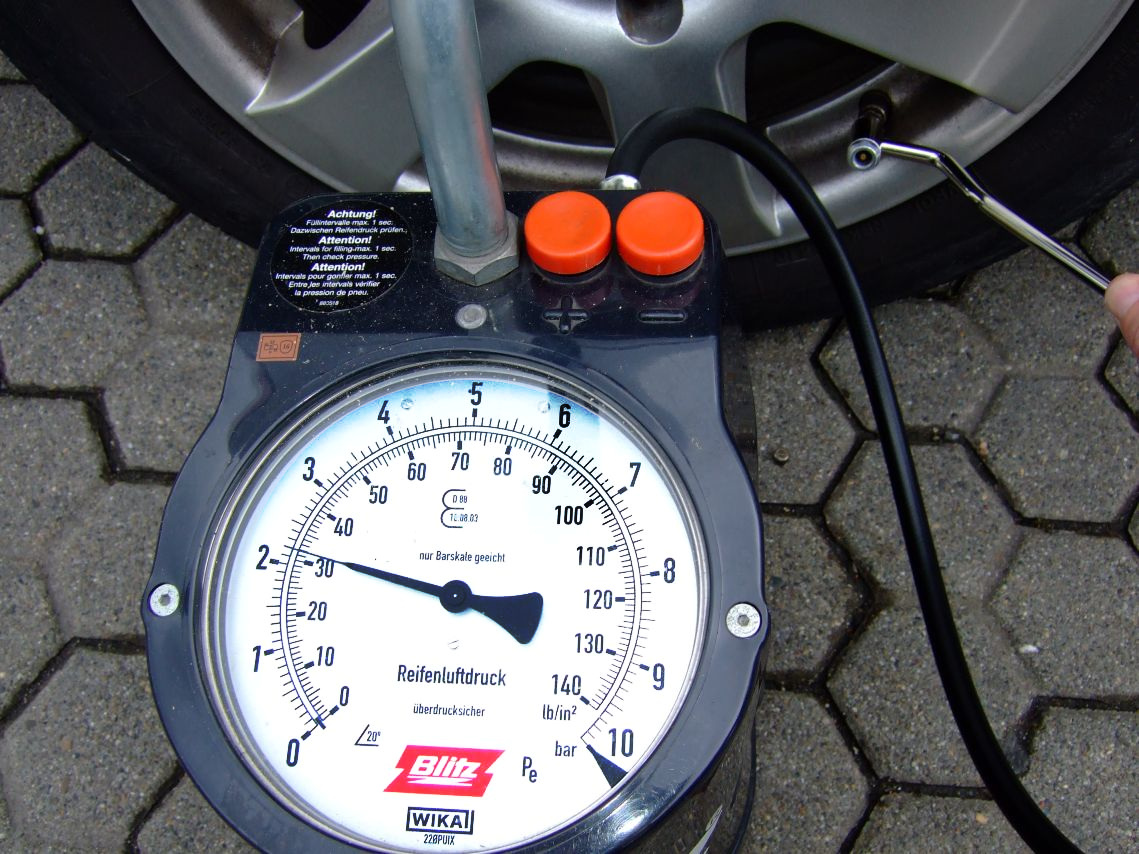
A tire-pressure gauge displaying bar (outside) and pounds per square inch (inside)

Atmospheric air pressure where standard atmospheric pressure is defined as 1013.25 mbar, 101.325 kPa, 1.01325 bar, which is about 14.7 pounds per square inch. Despite the millibar not being an SI unit, meteorologists and weather reporters worldwide have long measured air pressure in millibar as the values are convenient. Since the advent of SI units, some meteorologists began using hectopascals (symbol hPa) which are numerically equivalent to millibar; for the same reason, the hectopascal is the standard unit used to express barometric pressures in aviation in most countries. For example, the Meteorological Service of Canada uses kilopascals and hectopascals on their weather maps. In contrast, Americans are familiar with the use of the millibar in US reports of hurricanes and other cyclonic storms.

In fresh water, there is an approximate numerical equivalence between the change in pressure in decibar and the change in depth from the water surface in metres. Specifically, an increase of 1 decibar occurs for an increase in depth of 1.019716 m. In sea water with respect to the gravity variation, the latitude and the geopotential anomaly the pressure can be converted into metres' depth according to an empirical formula. As a result, decibar is commonly used in oceanography.

In scuba diving, bar is also the most widely used unit to express pressure, e.g. 200 bar being a full standard scuba tank, and depth increments of 10 metre of seawater being equivalent to 1 bar of pressure.

Engineers commonly use the bar as a unit of pressure because using pascals would involve using very large numbers. In measurement of vacuum and in vacuum engineering, residual pressures are typically given in millibar, although torr or millimetre of mercury (mmHg) were historically common.

Pressures resulting from deflagrations are often expressed in units of bar.

In the automotive field, turbocharger boost is often described in bar outside the United States. Tire pressure is often specified in bar. In hydraulic machinery components are rated to the maximum system oil pressure, which is typically in hundreds of bar. For example, 300 bar is common for industrial fixed machinery.

In the maritime ship industries, pressures in piping systems, such as cooling water systems, is often measured in bar.

Unicode has characters for "mb" (U+33D4 ㏔ SQUARE MB SMALL), "bar" (U+3374 ㍴ SQUARE BAR) and ミリバール (U+334A ㍊ SQUARE MIRIBAARU; "millibar" spelt in katakana), but they exist only for compatibility with legacy Asian encodings and are not intended to be used in new documents.

The kilobar, equivalent to 100 MPa, is commonly used in geological systems, particularly in experimental petrology.

The abbreviations "bar(a)" and "bara" are sometimes used to indicate absolute pressures, and "bar(g)" and "barg" for gauge pressures. The usage is deprecated but still prevails in the oil industry (often by capitalized "BarG" and "BarA"). As gauge pressure is relative to the current ambient pressure, which may vary in absolute terms by about 50 mbar, "BarG" and "BarA" are not interconvertible. Fuller descriptions such as "gauge pressure of 2 bars" or "2-bar gauge" are recommended.

== See also ==
- Centimetre or millimetre of water
- Conversion of units § Pressure or mechanical stress
- List of metric units
- Metric prefix
- Orders of magnitude (pressure) § 100kPa
