= Pound per square inch =

Unit of pressure or stress

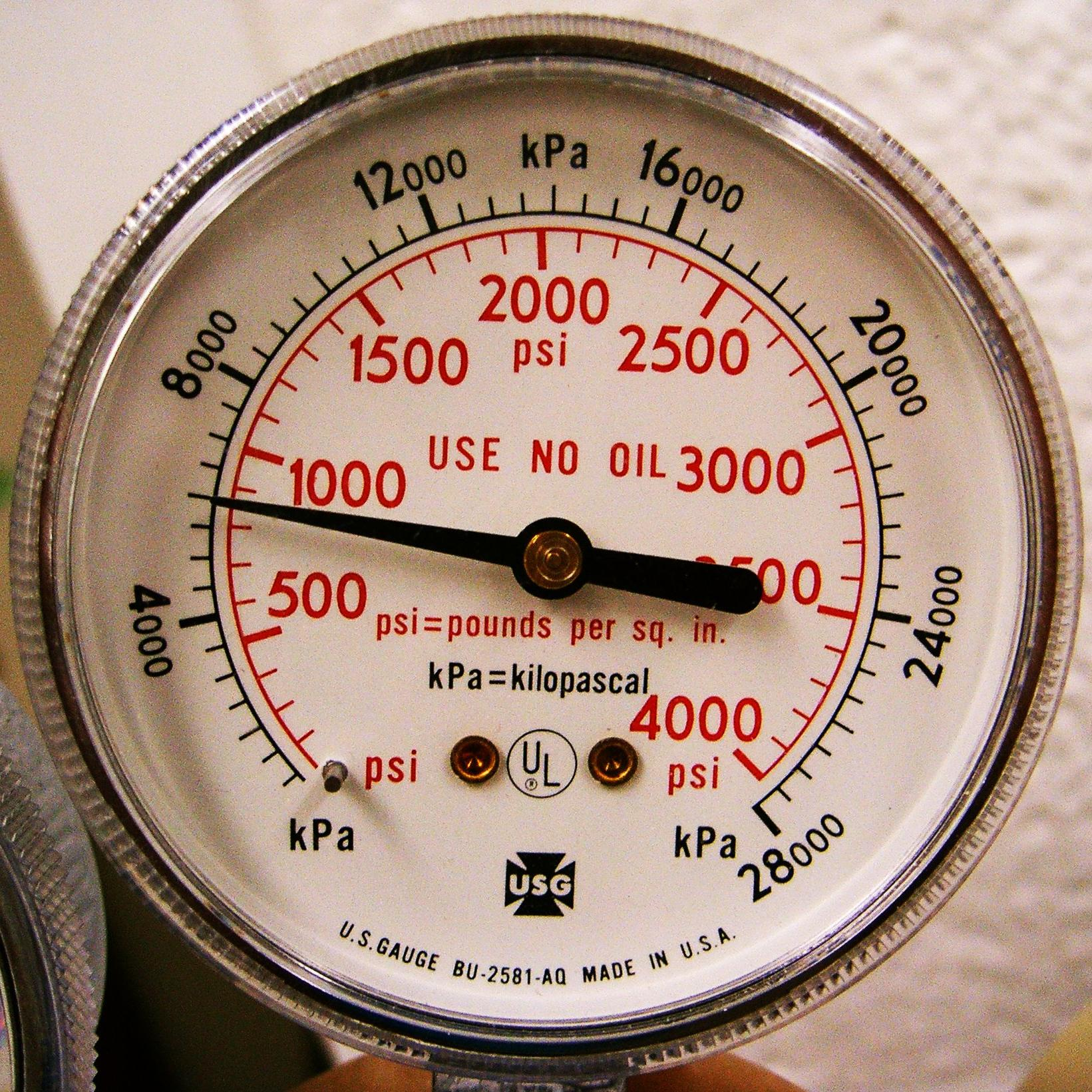
- A pressure gauge reading in psi (red scale) and kPa (black scale)

General information
- Unit system: Imperial units, US customary units
- Unit of: Pressure, stress
- Symbol: psi, lbf/in^{2}

Conversions
1 psi in ...	... is equal to ...
- SI units: ≈ 6894.757 Pa

The pound per square inch (abbreviation: psi) or, more accurately, pound-force per square inch (symbol: lbf/in^{2}), is a unit of measurement of pressure or of stress based on avoirdupois units and used primarily in the United States. It is the pressure resulting from a force with magnitude of one pound-force applied to an area of one square inch. In SI units, 1 psi is approximately 6.895 kilopascals.

The pound per square inch absolute (psia) is used to make it clear that the pressure is relative to a vacuum rather than the ambient atmospheric pressure. Since atmospheric pressure at sea level is around 14.7 psi (101 kilopascals), this will be added to any pressure reading made in air at sea level. The converse is pound per square inch gauge (psig), indicating that the pressure is relative to atmospheric pressure. For example, a bicycle tire pumped up to 65 psig in a local atmospheric pressure at sea level (14.7 psi) will have a pressure of 79.7 psia (14.7 psi + 65 psi). When gauge pressure is referenced to something other than ambient atmospheric pressure, then the unit is pound per square inch differential (psid).

== Multiples ==
The kilopound per square inch (ksi) is a scaled unit derived from psi, equivalent to a thousand psi (1000 lbf/in^{2}).

ksi are not widely used for gas pressures. They are mostly used in materials science, where the tensile strength of a material is measured as a large number of psi.

The conversion in SI units is 1 ksi = 6.895 MPa, or 1 MPa = 0.145 ksi.

The megapound per square inch (Mpsi) is another multiple equal to a million psi. It is used in mechanics for the elastic modulus of materials, especially for metals.

The conversion in SI units is 1 Mpsi = 6.895 GPa, or 1 GPa = 0.145 Mpsi.

== Magnitude ==
- Inch of water: 0.036 psid
- Blood pressure – clinically normal human blood pressure (120/80 millimetre of mercury (mmHg)): 2.32 psig/1.55 psig
- Natural gas residential piped in for consumer appliance; 4–6 psig.
- Boost pressure provided by an automotive turbocharger (common): 6–15 psig
- NFL football: 12.5–13.5 psig
- Atmospheric pressure at sea level (standard): 14.7 psia
- Automobile tire overpressure (common): 32 psig
- Bicycle tire overpressure (common): 65 psig
- Workshop or garage air tools: 90 psig
- Railway air brakes or road brakes reservoir overpressure (common): 90–120 psig
- Road racing bicycle tire overpressure: 120 psig
- Steam locomotive fire tube boiler (UK, 20th century): 150–280 psig
- Union Pacific Big Boy steam locomotive boiler: 300 psig
- US Navy steam boiler pressure: 800 psi
- Natural gas pipelines: 800–1,000 psig
- Full SCBA (self-contained breathing apparatus) for IDLH (non-fire) atmospheres: 2,216 psig
- Nuclear reactor primary loop: 2300 psi
- Full SCUBA (self-contained underwater breathing apparatus) tank overpressure (common): 3,000 psig
- Full SCBA (self-contained breathing apparatus) for interior firefighting operations: 4,500 psig
- Airbus A380 hydraulic system: 5,000 psig
- Land Rover Td5 diesel engine fuel injection pressure: 22,500 psi
- Ultimate tensile strength of ASTM A36 steel: 58,000 psi
- Water jet cutter: 40,000–100,000 psig

== Conversions ==
The conversions to and from SI are computed from exact definitions but result in a repeating decimal.

$$\begin{align}
1 \, \mathrm{lbf / in ^ 2} & = \frac{(0.453\,592\,37 \, \mathrm{kg} \times 9.806\,65 \, \mathrm{m / s ^ 2}) / \mathrm{lbf}}{(0.0254 \, \mathrm{m / in}) ^ 2} \, \mathrm{lbf / in ^ 2} \\
& = \frac{8896\,443\,230\,521}{1290\,320\,000} \, \mathrm{Pa} \\
& \approx 6894.757 \, \mathrm{Pa} \\
1 \, \mathrm{Pa} & = \frac{1290\,320\,000}{8896\,443\,230\,521} \, \mathrm{lbf / in ^ 2} \\
& \approx 0.000\,145\,0377 \, \mathrm{lbf / in ^ 2} \\
1 \, \mathrm{kPa} & \approx 0.\,145\,0377 \, \mathrm{lbf / in ^ 2} \\
\end{align}$$

Approximate conversions (rounded to some arbitrary number of digits, except when denoted by "≡") are shown in the following table.

Pressure units
	Pascals	Bars	Standard atmospheres	Pounds per square inch	Millimetres of mercury	Inches of mercury	Technical atmospheres	Torrs
1 Pa	≡ 1 N/m^{2}	= 1×10^{−5} bar	≈ 9.86923×10^{−6} atm	≈ 1.45038×10^{−4} psi	≈ 7.50062×10^{−3} mmHg	≈ 2.95300×10^{−4} inHg	≈ 1.01972×10^{−5} kgf/cm^{2}	≈ 7.50062×10^{−3} Torr
1 bar	= 100000 Pa	≡ 100 000 N/m^{2}	≈ 0.98692 atm	≈ 14.5038 psi	≈ 750.062 mmHg	≈ 29.5300 inHg	≈ 1.01972 kgf/cm^{2}	≈ 750.062 Torr
1 atm	= 101325 Pa	= 1.01325 bar	≡ 101 325 N/m^{2}	≈ 14.6959 psi	≈ 760.000 mmHg	≈ 29.9213 inHg	≈ 1.03323 kgf/cm^{2}	= 760 Torr
1 psi	≈ 6894.76 Pa	≈ 0.06895 bar	≈ 0.06805 atm	≡ 1 lb/in^{2}	≈ 51.7149 mmHg	≈ 2.03602 inHg	≈ 0.07031 kgf/cm^{2}	≈ 51.7149 Torr
1 mmHg	≈ 133.322 Pa	≈ 1.33322×10^{−3} bar	≈ 1.31579×10^{−3} atm	≈ 0.01934 psi	≡ g_{n} × .001 m × 13595.1 kg/m^{3}	≈ 0.03937 inHg	≈ 1.35951×10^{−3} kgf/cm^{2}	≈ 1.00000 Torr
1 inHg	≈ 3386.39 Pa	≈ 0.03386 bar	≈ 0.03342 atm	≈ 0.49115 psi	= 25.4 mmHg	≡ g_{n} × .0254 m × 13595.1 kg/m^{3}	≈ 0.0345316 kgf/cm^{2}	≈ 25.4000 Torr
1 kgf/cm^{2}	≈ 98066.5 Pa	≈ 0.98066 bar	≈ 0.96784 atm	≈ 14.2233 psi	≈ 735.559 mmHg	≈ 28.9590 inHg	≡ 1 kgf/cm^{2}	≈ 735.559 Torr
1 Torr	≈ 133.322 Pa	≈ 1.33322×10^{−3} bar	≈ 1.31579×10^{−3} atm	≈ 0.01934 psi	≈ 1.00000 mmHg	≈ 0.03937 inHg	≈ 1.35951×10^{−3} kgf/cm^{2}	≡ (101 325)/760 = (20 265)/172 N/m^{2}

== See also ==
- Conversion of units: Pressure or mechanical stress
- Pressure: Units
