= Specific weight =

Weight per unit volume of a material

The specific weight, also known as the unit weight (symbol γ, the Greek letter gamma), is a volume-specific quantity defined as the weight W divided by the volume V of a material:
$$\gamma = \frac{W}{V} \ .$$
Equivalently, it may also be formulated as the product of density, ρ, and gravity acceleration, g:
$$\gamma = \rho \, g .$$
Its unit of measurement in the International System of Units (SI) is the newton per cubic metre (N/m^{3}), expressed in terms of base units as kg⋅m^{−2}⋅s^{−2}. A commonly used value is the specific weight of water on Earth at 4 °C (39 °F), which is 9.807 kilonewtons per cubic metre or 62.43 pounds-force per cubic foot.

== Discussion ==
The density of a material is defined as mass divided by volume, typically expressed with the unit kg/m^{3}. Unlike density, specific weight is not a fixed property of a material, as it depends on the value of the gravitational acceleration, which varies with location (e.g., Earth's gravity). In practice, the standard gravity (a constant) is often assumed, usually taken as 9.80665 m/s^{2}.

Pressure may also affect values, depending upon the bulk modulus of the material, but generally, at moderate pressures, has a less significant effect than the other factors.

== Applications ==
=== Fluid mechanics ===
In fluid mechanics, specific weight represents the force exerted by gravity on a unit volume of a fluid. For this reason, units are expressed as force per unit volume (e.g., N/m^{3} or lbf/ft^{3}). Specific weight can be used as a characteristic property of a fluid.

=== Soil mechanics ===
Specific weight is often used as a property of soil to solve earthwork problems.

In soil mechanics, specific weight may refer to:

Moist unit weight
The unit weight of a soil when void spaces of the soil contain both water and air.
$$\gamma = \frac{(1+w)G_\text{s}\gamma_\text{w}}{1+e}$$
where
- γ is the moist unit weight of the material
- γ_{w} is the unit weight of water
- w is the moisture content of the material
- G_{s} is the specific gravity of the solid
- e is the void ratio
Dry unit weight
The unit weight of a soil when all void spaces of the soil are completely filled with air, with no water. The formula for dry unit weight is:
$$\gamma_\text{d} = \frac{G_\text{s}\gamma_\text{w}}{1+e} = \frac{\gamma}{1+w}$$
where
- γ is the moist unit weight of the material
- γ_{d} is the dry unit weight of the material
- γ_{w} is the unit weight of water
- w is the moisture content of the material
- G_{s} is the specific gravity of the solid
- e is the void ratio
Saturated unit weight
The unit weight of a soil when all void spaces of the soil are completely filled with water, with no air. The formula for saturated unit weight is:
$$\gamma_\text{s} = \frac{(G_\text{s}+e)\gamma_\text{w}}{1+e}$$
where
- γ_{s} is the saturated unit weight of the material
- γ_{w} is the unit weight of water
- G_{s} is the specific gravity of the solid
- e is the void ratio
Submerged unit weight
The difference between the saturated unit weight and the unit weight of water. It is often used in the calculation of the effective stress in a soil. The formula for submerged unit weight is:
$$\gamma' = \gamma_\text{s} - \gamma_\text{w}$$
where
- γ′ is the submerged unit weight of the material
- γ_{s} is the saturated unit weight of the material
- γ_{w} is the unit weight of water

=== Civil and mechanical engineering ===
Specific weight can be used in civil engineering and mechanical engineering to determine the weight of a structure designed to carry certain loads while remaining intact and remaining within limits regarding deformation.

== Specific weight of water ==
Specific weight of water at standard sea-level atmospheric pressure (metric units)
Temperature (°C)	Specific weight (kN/m^{3})
0	9.805
5	9.807
10	9.804
15	9.798
20	9.789
25	9.777
30	9.765
40	9.731
50	9.690
60	9.642
70	9.589
80	9.530
90	9.467
100	9.399

Specific weight of water at standard sea-level atmospheric pressure (imperial units)
Temperature (°F)	Specific weight (lbf/ft^{3})
32	62.42
40	62.43
50	62.41
60	62.37
70	62.30
80	62.22
90	62.11
100	62.00
110	61.86
120	61.71
130	61.55
140	61.38
150	61.20
160	61.00
170	60.80
180	60.58
190	60.36
200	60.12
212	59.83

== Specific weight of air ==
Specific weight of air at standard sea-level atmospheric pressure (metric units)
Temperature (°C)	Specific weight (N/m^{3})
−40	14.86
−20	13.86
0	12.68
10	12.24
20	11.82
30	11.43
40	11.06
60	10.4
80	9.81
100	9.28
200	7.33

Specific weight of air at standard sea-level atmospheric pressure (imperial units)
Temperature (°F)	Specific weight (lbf/ft^{3})
−40	
−20	0.0903
0	0.08637
10	0.08453
20	0.08277
30	0.08108
40	0.07945
50	0.0779
60	0.0764
70	0.07495
80	0.07357
90	0.07223
100	0.07094
120	0.06849
140	0.0662
160	0.06407
180	0.06206
200	0.06018
250	0.05594
