= Square inch =

Unit of area

square inch
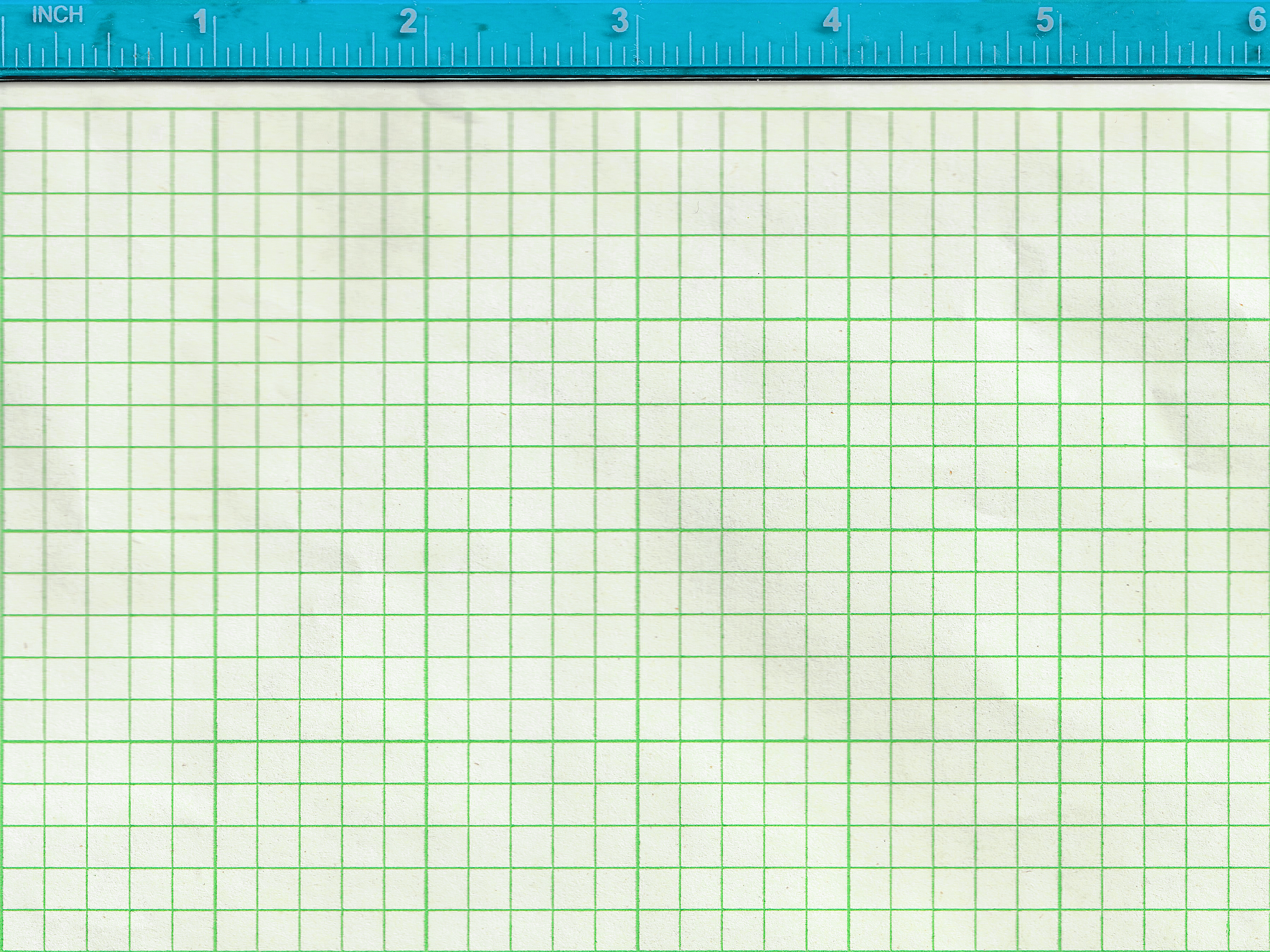
- Engineering paper, with the cropped scan depicting 24 square inches (25 smaller squares compose 1 square inch)

General information
- Unit system: Imperial, United States customary units
- Unit of: area
- Symbol: in^{2}, sq in

Conversions
1 in^{2} in ...	... is equal to ...
- Imperial/US: 1/144 sq ft; 1/1296 sq yd
- SI units: 6.4516 cm^{2}; 6.4516×10^{−4} m^{2}

A square inch (plural: square inches) is a unit of area, equal to the area of a square with sides of one inch. The square inch is a common unit of measurement in the United States and the United Kingdom. Pounds per square inch (psi), a unit of pressure, are derived from this unit of area.

== Representations ==
The following symbols are used to denote square inches:

- square in
- sq inches, sq inch, sq in
- inches/-2, inch/-2, in/-2
- inches^2, inch^2, in^2
- inches^{2}, inch^{2}, in^{2} (also denoted by "^{^{2}})
- historic usage ^{□}″ (number with a square & a double apostrophe, both as an exponent)

== Equivalence with other units of area ==
1 square international inch is equal to (the overbars indicate repeating decimals):

- 0.006 94̅ square feet (1 square foot is equal to 144 square inches)
- 0.000 77̅1̅ 6̅0̅4̅ 9̅3̅8̅2̅ square yards (1 square yard is equal to 1,296 square inches)
- 6.4516 square centimetres (1 square centimetre is equal to 0.155 000 310... square inches)
- 0.000 645 16 square metres (1 square metre is equal to 1,550.003 100... square inches)
- π/4 circular inches (1 circular inch is equal to 4/π square inches)
