= Inch of mercury =

Measurement unit for pressure

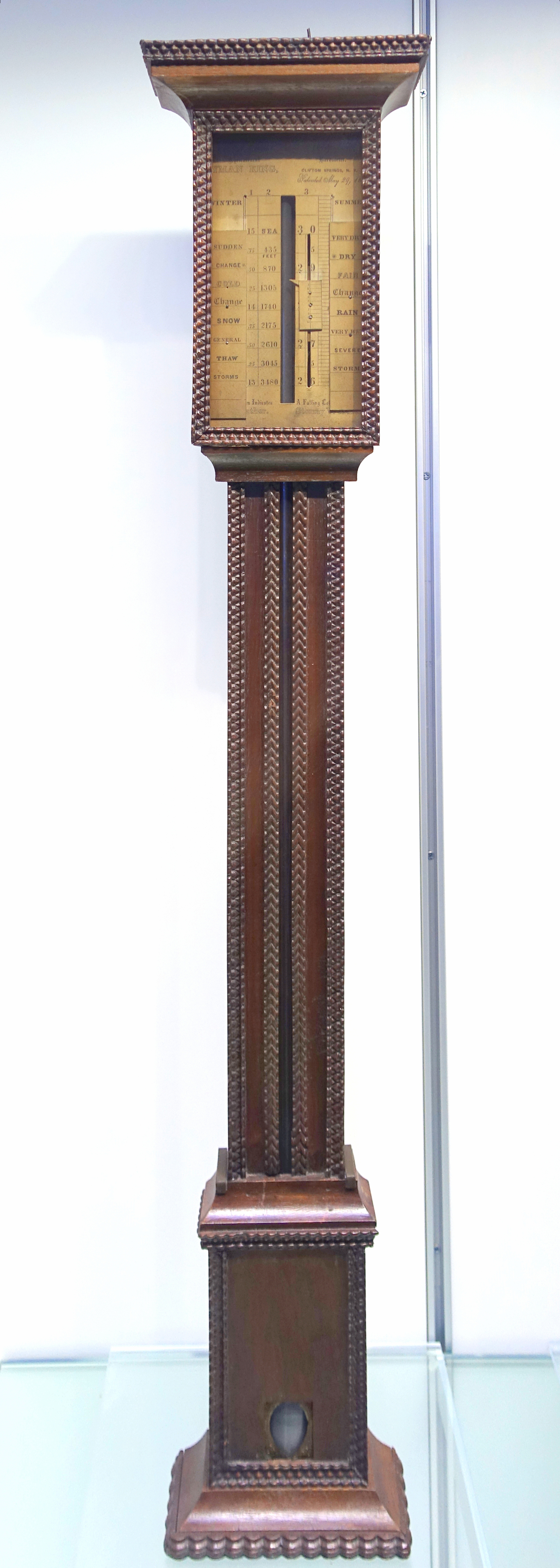
- Early American barometer calibrated in inches of mercury

General information
- Unit of: Pressure
- Symbol: inHg, ″Hg

Conversions
1 inHg in ...	... is equal to ...
- SI units: 3.38639 kPa
- United States customary units: 0.491154 psi

Inch of mercury (inHg, ″Hg, or in) is a non-SI unit of measurement for pressure. It is used for barometric pressure in weather reports, refrigeration and aviation in the United States.

It is the pressure exerted by a column of mercury 1 inch (25.4 mm) in height at the standard acceleration of gravity. Conversion to metric units depends on the density of mercury, and hence its temperature; typical conversion factors are:

Conditions	Pressure
conventional	3386.389 pascals
32 °F (0 °C)	3386.38 pascals
60 °F (16 °C)	3376.85 pascals

In older literature, an "inch of mercury" is based on the height of a column of mercury at 60 °F (15.6 °C).

1 inHg_{60 °F} = 3,376.85 pascals (33.7685 hPa)

In Imperial units: 1 inHg_{60 °F} = 0.489 771 psi, or 2.041 771 inHg_{60 °F} = 1 psi.

== Applications ==
=== Aircraft and automobiles ===
Aircraft altimeters measure the relative pressure difference between the lower ambient pressure at altitude and a calibrated reading on the ground. In North America and Japan, these altimeter readings are provided in inches of mercury, but most other nations use hectopascals. Ground readings vary with weather and along the route of the aircraft as it travels, so current readings are relayed periodically by air traffic control. Aircraft operating at higher altitudes (at or above what is called the transition altitude, which varies by country) set their barometric altimeters to a standard pressure of 29.92 inHg (1 atm = 29.92 inHg) or 1013.25 hPa (1 hPa = 1 mbar) regardless of the actual sea level pressure. The resulting altimeter readings are known as flight levels.

Piston engine aircraft with constant-speed propellers also use inches of mercury to measure manifold pressure, which is indicative of engine power produced in engines equipped with a supercharger or turbosupercharger (naturally aspirated engines measure manifold vacuum instead). In automobile racing, particularly United States Auto Club and Champ Car Indy car racing, inches of mercury was the unit used to measure turbocharger inlet pressure. However, the inch of mercury is still used today in car performance modification to measure the amount of vacuum or pressure within the engine's intake manifold. This can be seen on "boost gauges (forced induction) or vacuum gauges (natural induction), which give a rough indication of the relative power being produced at any given time.

=== Cooling systems ===
In air conditioning and refrigeration, inHg is often used to describe "inches of mercury vacuum", or pressures below ambient atmospheric pressure, for recovery of refrigerants from air conditioning and refrigeration systems, as well as for leak testing of systems while under a vacuum, and for dehydration of refrigeration systems. The low-side gauge in a refrigeration gauge manifold indicates pressures below ambient in "inches of mercury vacuum" (inHg), down to a 30 inHg vacuum.

Inches of mercury is also used in automotive cooling system vacuum test and fill tools. A technician will use this tool to remove air from modern automotive cooling systems, test the system's ability to hold vacuum, and subsequently refill using the vacuum as suction for the new coolant. Typical minimum vacuum values are between 22 and 27 inHg.

=== Vacuum brakes ===
Inches of mercury was the usual unit of pressure measurement in railway vacuum brakes.

== See also ==
- Torr (millimeters of mercury)
- Bar (unit)
- Mercury barometer
- Millimetre of mercury
