= Standard gravity =

Standard gravitational acceleration on Earth

standard acceleration of gravity
- Common symbols: $g, g_0, g_n, g_e$
- SI unit: m/s^{2} (metre per second squared)
- In SI base units: m⋅s^{−2}
- Dimension: $\mathsf{L} \mathsf{T}^{-2}$
- Value: 9.80665 m⋅s^{−2}

The standard acceleration of gravity or standard acceleration of free fall, often called simply standard gravity, is the nominal gravitational acceleration of an object in a vacuum near the surface of the Earth. It is a constant defined by ISO standard 80000 as 9.80665 m/s^{2} (about 32.17405 ft/s^{2}), denoted typically by ɡ_{0} (sometimes also ɡ_{n}, ɡ_{e}, (Note: Though this sometimes means the normal gravity at the equator, 9.7803267715 m/s^{2} (32.087686258 ft/s^{2})) or simply ɡ). This value was established by the third General Conference on Weights and Measures (1901, CR 70) and used to define the standard weight of an object as the product of its mass and this nominal acceleration. The acceleration of a body near the surface of the Earth is due to the combined effects of gravity and centrifugal acceleration from the rotation of the Earth (but the latter is small enough to be negligible for most purposes); the total (the apparent gravity) is about 0.5% greater at the poles than at the Equator.

Although the symbol ɡ is sometimes used for standard gravity, ɡ (without a suffix) can also mean the local acceleration due to local gravity and centrifugal acceleration, which varies depending on one's position on Earth (see Earth's gravity). The symbol ɡ should not be confused with G, the gravitational constant, or g, the symbol for gram. The ɡ is also used as a unit for any form of acceleration, with the value defined as above.

The value of ɡ_{0} defined above is a nominal midrange value on Earth, originally based on the acceleration of a body in free fall at sea level at a geodetic latitude of 45°. Although the actual acceleration of free fall on Earth varies according to location, the above standard figure is always used for metrological purposes. In particular, since it is the ratio of the kilogram-force and the kilogram, its numeric value when expressed in coherent SI units is the ratio of the kilogram-force and the newton, two units of force.

== History ==
Already in the early days of its existence, the International Committee for Weights and Measures (CIPM) proceeded to define a standard thermometric scale, using the boiling point of water. Since the boiling point varies with the atmospheric pressure, the CIPM needed to define a standard atmospheric pressure. The definition they chose was based on the weight of a column of mercury of 760 mm. But since that weight depends on the local gravity, they now also needed a standard gravity. The 1887 CIPM meeting decided as follows:

The value of this standard acceleration due to gravity is equal to the acceleration due to gravity at the International Bureau (alongside the Pavillon de Breteuil) divided by 1.0003322, the theoretical coefficient required to convert to a latitude of 45° at sea level.

All that was needed to obtain a numerical value for standard gravity was now to measure the gravitational strength at the International Bureau. This task was given to Gilbert Étienne Defforges of the Geographic Service of the French Army. The value he found, based on measurements taken in March and April 1888, was 9.80991(5) m⋅s^{−2}.

This result formed the basis for determining the value still used today for standard gravity. The third General Conference on Weights and Measures, held in 1901, adopted a resolution declaring as follows:

The value adopted in the International Service of Weights and Measures for the standard acceleration due to Earth's gravity is 980.665 cm/s^{2}, value already stated in the laws of some countries.

The numeric value adopted for ɡ_{0} was, in accordance with the 1887 CIPM declaration, obtained by dividing Defforges's result – 980.991 cm⋅s^{−2} in the cgs system then en vogue – by 1.0003322 while not taking more digits than are warranted considering the uncertainty in the result.

== Conversions ==
Conversions between common units of acceleration
Base value	(Gal, or cm/s^{2})	(ft/s^{2})	(m/s^{2})	(standard gravity, g_{0})
1 Gal, or cm/s^{2}	1	0.0328084	0.01	1.01972×10^{−3}
1 ft/s^{2}	30.4800	1	0.304800	0.0310810
1 m/s^{2}	100	1/0.3048 ≈ 3.28084	1	0.101972
1 g_{0}	980.665	32.1740	9.80665	1

== See also ==
- Gravity of Earth
- Gravity map
- Seconds pendulum
- Theoretical gravity
