= Imperial and US customary measurement systems =

English (pre 1824), Imperial (post 1824) and US Customary (post 1776) units of measure

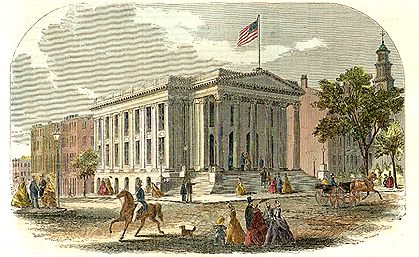
Cincinnati Customs House c. 1850–60 Governments were one of the earliest users of weights and measures – often for the purpose of tax collection. In the United States the US Treasury rather than Congress took the lead in establishing a standard system of weights and measures.

The imperial and US customary measurement systems are both derived from an earlier English system of measurement which in turn can be traced back to Ancient Roman units of measurement, and Carolingian and Saxon units of measure.

The US Customary system of units was developed and used in the United States after the American Revolution, based on a subset of the English units used in the Thirteen Colonies. It is the predominant system of units in the United States and its territories, except for Puerto Rico and Guam, where the metric system was introduced under Spanish rule and remains prevalent. The imperial system of units was developed and used in the United Kingdom and its empire beginning in 1824. The metric system has, to varying degrees, replaced the imperial system in the countries that once used it.

Most of the units of measure have been adapted in one way or another since the Norman Conquest (1066). The units of linear measure have changed the least – the yard (which replaced the ell) and the chain were measures derived in England. The foot used by craftsmen supplanted the longer foot used in agriculture. The agricultural foot was reduced to 10/11 of its former size, causing the rod, pole or perch to become 16 1/2 (rather than the older 15) agricultural feet. The furlong and the acre, once it became a measure of the size of a piece of land rather than its value, remained relatively unchanged. In the last thousand years, three principal pounds were used in England. The troy pound (5760 grains) was used for precious metals, the apothecaries' pound, (also 5760 grains) was used by pharmacists and the avoirdupois pound (7000 grains) was used for general purposes. The apothecaries and troy pounds are divided into 12 ounces (of 480 grains) while the avoirdupois pound has 16 ounces (of 437.5 grains).

The unit of volume, the gallon, has different values in the United States and in the United Kingdom, with the US gallon being 83.26742% of the imperial gallon: the US gallon is based on the wine gallon used in England prior to 1826. There was a US dry gallon, which was 96.8939% of an imperial gallon (and exactly 1 15121/92400 of a US gallon), but this is no longer used and is no longer listed in the relevant statute.

After the United States Declaration of Independence the units of measurement in the United States developed into what is now known as customary units. The United Kingdom overhauled its system of measurement in 1826, when it introduced the imperial system of units. This resulted in the two countries having different gallons. Later in the century, efforts were made to align the definition of the pound and the yard in the two countries by using copies of the standards adopted by the British Parliament in 1855. However, these standards were of poor quality compared with those produced for the Convention of the Metre.

In 1960, the two countries agreed to common definitions of the yard and the pound based on definitions of the metre and the kilogram. This change, which amounted to a few parts per million, had little effect in the United Kingdom, but resulted in the United States having two slightly different systems of linear measure, the international system and the surveyors system, until the latter was deprecated in 2023.

== English units of measure ==
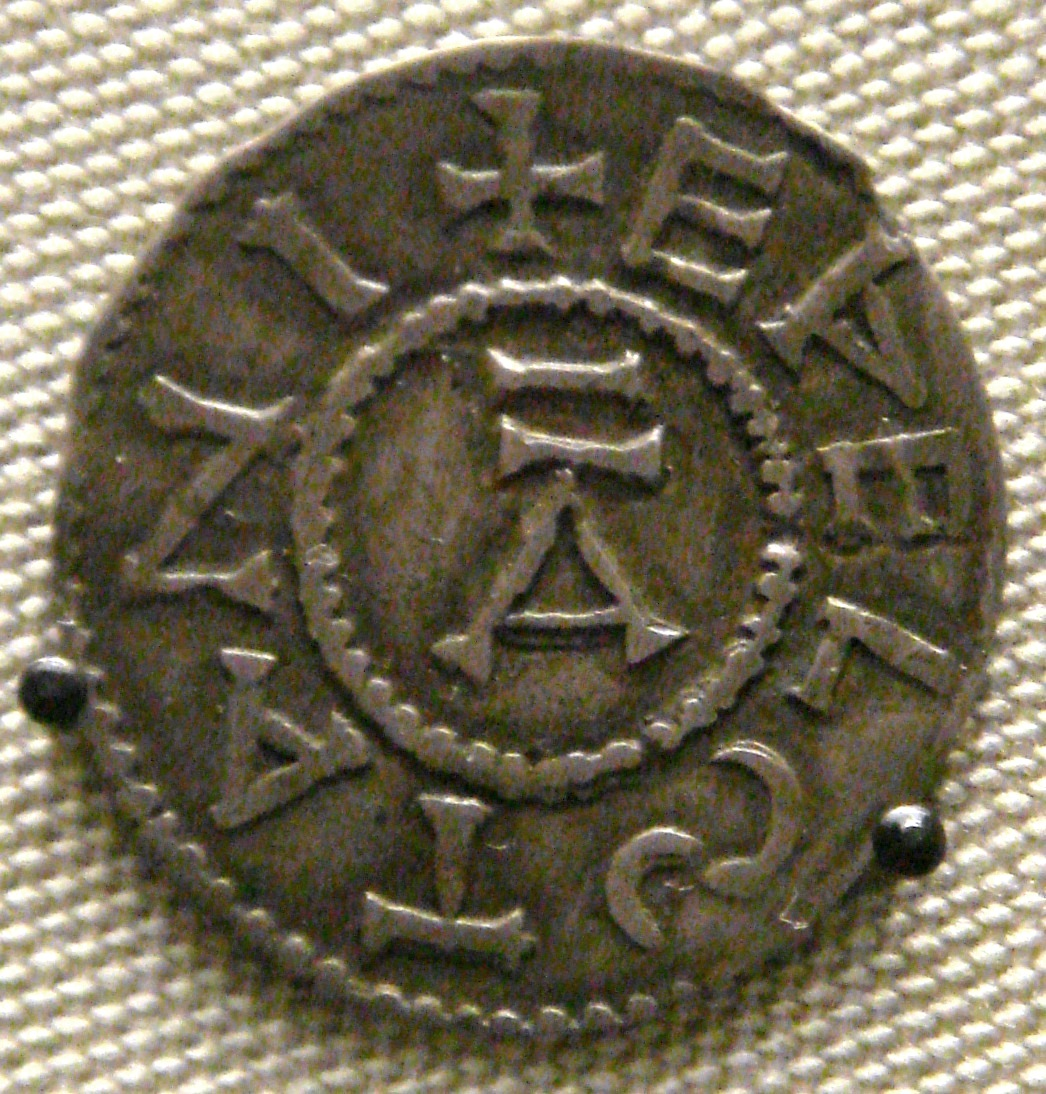
Silver penny of Æthelstan (924–939) from which the name pennyweight (dwt) was derived

English units of measure were derived from a combination of Roman, Carolingian and Saxon units of measure. They were a precursor to both the imperial system of units (first defined in 1824, to take effect in 1826) and United States customary units which evolved from English Units from 1776 onwards.

The earliest records of English units of measure involve the weight (and therefore the value) of Saxon coins. The penny introduced by Offa was about 20 grains (1.296 g). Edward the Elder increased the weight of the English penny to 26 grains (1.685 g), thereby aligning it with the penny of Charlemagne. By the time of the Norman Conquest (1066), it had decreased to 24 grains (1.555 g). This value was subsequently called the pennyweight and formed the basis of the Troy units of weight—the troy ounce used to this day for weighting precious metals. Edward I (1272–1307) broke the link between a coin's value and its weight when he debased the English coinage by introducing a groat (four pence) which weighed of 89 grains rather than the expected 96 grains. The groat was further devalued in the 1350s when its weight was reduced to 72 grains.

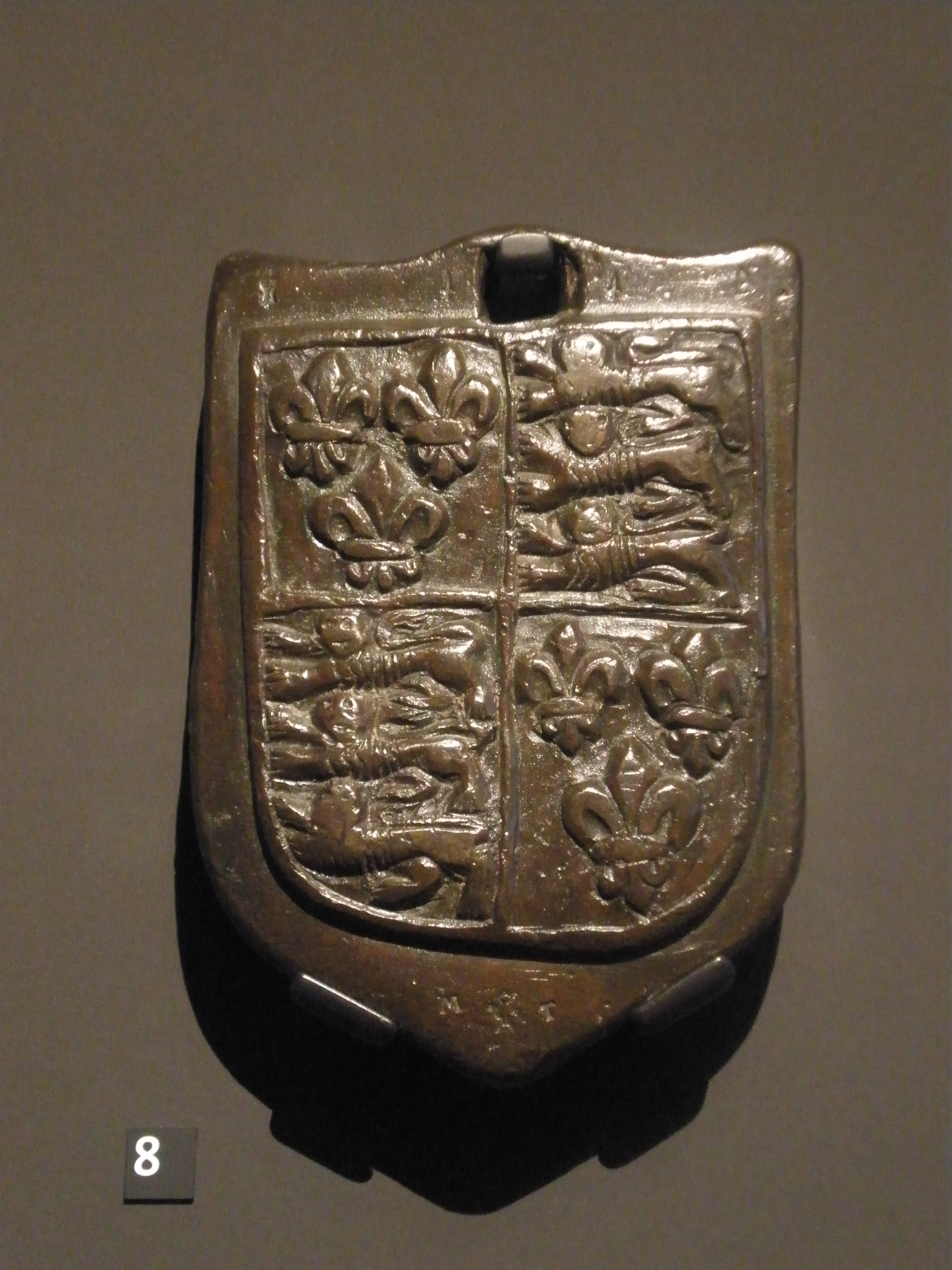
Bronze wool weight of 14 lb (6.4 kg) (1550–1600) stamped with the Royal coat of arms (Victoria and Albert Museum)

During Saxon times land was measured both in terms of its economic value and in terms of its size. The Domesday Book used the hide, an economic unit of measure. In other references the furlong and the rood appear to be units related to ploughing procedures. Of particular interest was the rood which was 15 North German feet in length, the North German foot being equivalent to 335 mm (13.2 inches). Craftsmen, on the other hand used a shorter Roman foot.

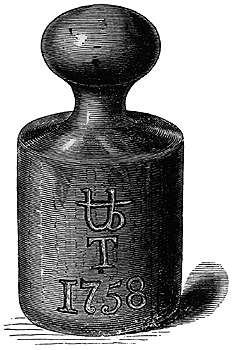
The standard Troy pound, destroyed in a fire in 1834

Standardization of weights and measures was a recurring issue for monarchs. In 965 AD, King Edgar decreed "that only one weight and one measure should pass throughout the King's dominion". In 1197 Richard I decreed that the measures of corn and pulse, and of wine and ale should be the same throughout all England. Magna Carta, signed by King John in 1215 extended this to include cloth. Some time between 1266 and 1303 the weights and measures of England were radically revised by a law known as the Composition of Yards and Perches (Compositio ulnarum et perticarum) often known as the Compositio for short. This law, attributed to either Henry III or his successor Edward I, instituted a new foot that was exactly 10/11 the length of the old foot, with corresponding reductions in the size of the yard, ell, inch, and barleycorn. (Furlongs remained the same, but the rod changed from 15 old feet to 16 1/2 new feet.)

In 1324 Edward II systematized units of length by defining the inch as 3 barleycorns, the foot as 12 inches, the yard as 3 feet, the perch as 5 1/2 yards, and the acre as an area 4 by 40 perches. Apart from the ell (45 inches or 114.3 cm, which continued to be used in the cloth trade) and the chain (introduced by Edmund Gunter in 1620, and used in land surveying), these units formed the basis of the units of length of the English system of measurement. The units were however redefined many times – during Henry VIII's time standard yards and ells made of brass were manufactured, during Elizabeth I's time these were replaced with standards made of bronze and in 1742, after scientific comparisons showed a variation of up to 0.2% from the mean, a definitive standard yard was proposed (but not manufactured).

During the medieval era, agricultural products other than wool were mostly sold by volume, with various bushels and gallons being introduced over the years for different commodities. In the early fourteenth century the wool trade traditionally used the avoirdupois system of weights, a process that was formalized by Edward III in 1340. At the same time, the stone, when used to weigh wool, was formalized as being 14 pounds.

During the Tudor period, numerous reforms were made to English weights and measures. In 1496 Henry VII ordered that reference copies of the yard, pound and gallon should be made of brass and distributed to specified towns and cities throughout the kingdom. Many weights and measures that had crept into use were banned: in 1527 Henry VIII banned the Tower pound (5400 grains against the 5760 grains of the apothecaries and troy pounds) and the mercantile pound (6750 grains against the 7000 grains of the pound avoirdupois) and in 1592 Elizabeth I ordered the use of the "statute mile" (5280 feet against the 5000 feet of the London or Old English mile).

Under the Act of Union of 1707, Scotland, which had developed its own system of weights and measures independently of England, abandoned them in favour of English weights and measures. The Acts of Union 1800 which united Ireland with Great Britain had less of an effect on weights and measures—Irish weights and measures having been based on the English foot and pound avoirdupois since 1351, though the Irish acre and mile were based on a perch of 7 yards, not 5 1/2 yards as in England.

By the early nineteenth century many commodities had their own set of units, the units of measure for the wool and cloth industries had units of measure specific to those commodities, albeit derived on the pound avoirdupois or the foot while wine and beer used units with the same names but different sizes – the wine gallon being 231 cubic inches and the beer or ale gallon being 282 cubic inches. Agricultural produce was sold by the bushel which was based on yet another gallon – the dry gallon of 268.8 cubic inches. Even though not explicitly permitted by statute, many markets used bushels based on weight rather than volume when selling wheat and barley.

== Imperial units ==
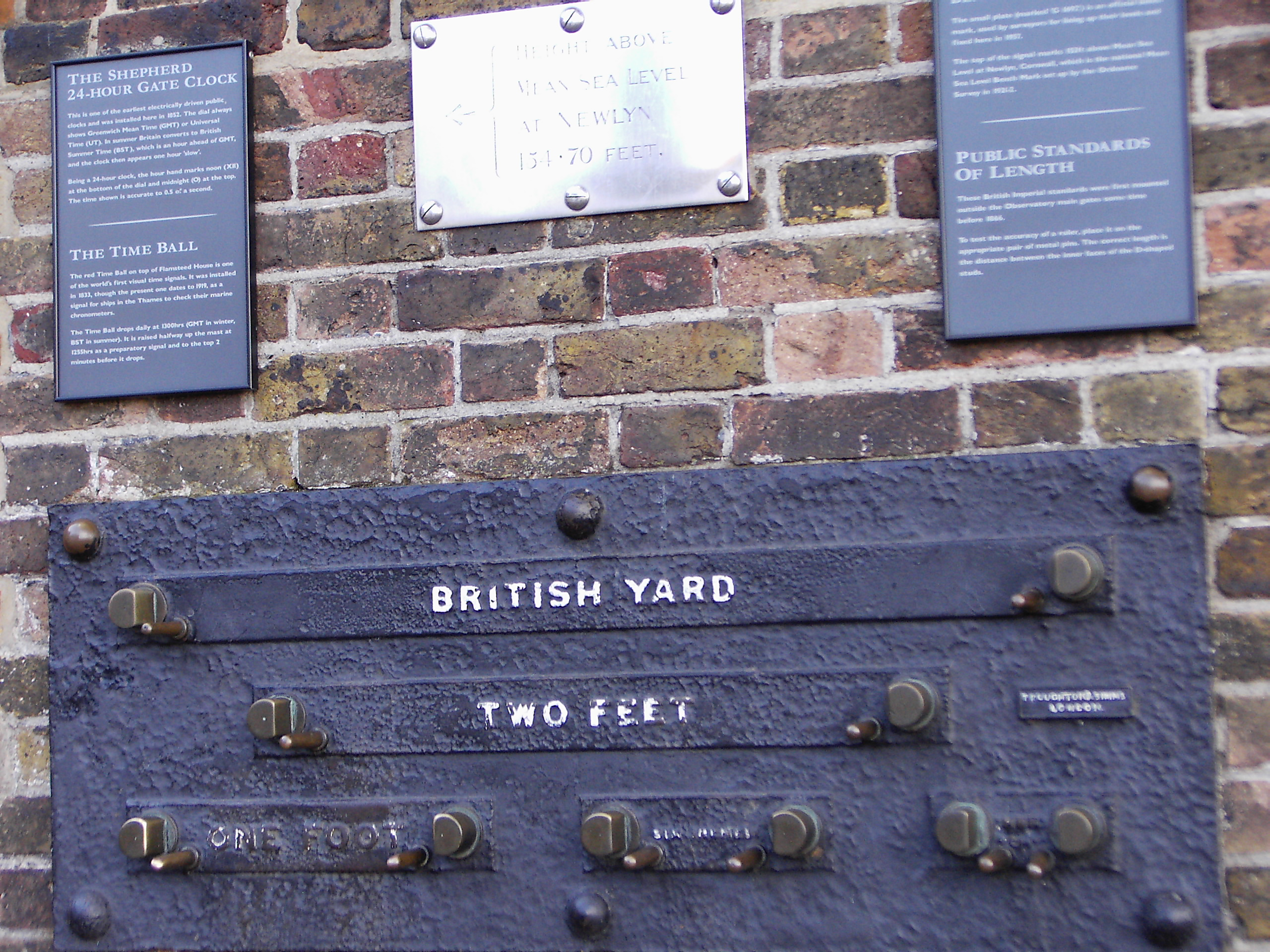
Public copies of the standard yard and its subdivisions at Greenwich Observatory

The British Weights and Measures Act 1824 repealed all existing British weights and measures legislation, some dating back to the 1300s, and redefined existing units of measure. In particular, a new standard yard and troy pound were manufactured as the standards for length and weight respectively. A new measure, the imperial gallon, which replaced the many gallons in use, (Note: Thomas Jefferson, in his Plan for Establishing Uniformity in the Coinage, Weights, and Measures of the United States identified 13 different gallons and 13 different bushels in used in Great Britain in 1790. The gallons ranged from the wine gallon of 224 cubic inches (3.67 L) to the beer and ale gallon of 282 cubic inches (4.62 L). The only consistency was 8 gallons to the bushel.) was defined as being the volume of 10 pounds of water at 62 °F (17 °C) which, after the authorized experiments, was found to be 277.274 cubic inches. The bushel, which like the gallon, had definitions reflecting the various gallons, was defined as 8 imperial gallons.

The Weights and Measures Act 1824 also introduced some changes to the administration of the standards of weights and measures: previously Parliament had been given the custody of the standards but the act passed this responsibility on to the Exchequer. The act also set up an inspectorate for weights and measures.

The standard yard and pound were lost in 1834 when a fire partially destroyed the Palace of Westminster. Following a report published in 1841 by a commission new standard yard and pound were manufactured using the best available secondary sources. Unlike the previous standard, the new pound standard was a pound avoirdupois. They were accepted by an act of Parliament as the standards for length and weight in 1855. Following the debacle over the different gallons that had been adopted by the United States and the United Kingdom thirty years earlier, one of the copies of the standard yard was offered to and accepted by the United States Government.

The Weights and Measures Act 1835 tidied up a number of shortcomings in the 1825 Act. In response to representations from traders, the stone and the hundredweight were formally defined as being 14 pounds and 112 pounds respectively and the experiment of defining a "heaped" measure as outlined in the 1824 Act was abandoned. Not all trades followed the use of the 14 stone—Britten, in 1880 for example, catalogued a number of different values of the stone in various British towns and cities ranging from 4 lb to 26 lb The 1835 Act also restricted the use of Troy measure to precious metals and required that coal be sold by weight and not by volume.

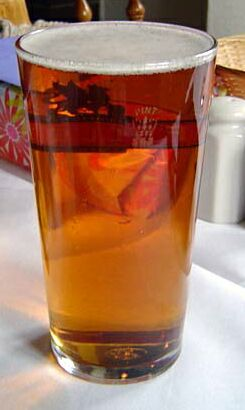
Draught beer is one of the few commodities in the United Kingdom that is still sold by the imperial pint.

The Weights and Measures Act 1878 overhauled the inspection regime of weights and measures used in trade. The act also reaffirmed the use of the brass standard yard and platinum standard pound as the standards for use in the United Kingdom, reaffirmed the use of apothecaries measures in the pharmaceutical industry, reaffirmed the 1824 definition of the gallon, removed the Troy pound from the list of legal units of measure, added the fathom to the list of legal units and fixed the ratio of metric to imperial units at one metre being equal to 39.3708 inches and one kilogram being equal to 15432.3487 grains (1 lb = 0.453592654 kg). Subsequent to the passing of the act, the volume of the gallon which had been defined as being the volume of 10 lb distilled water at 62 °F (17 °C) was remeasured and set at 277.42 cubic inches though HM Customs and Excise continued to use the 1824 definition for excise purposes.

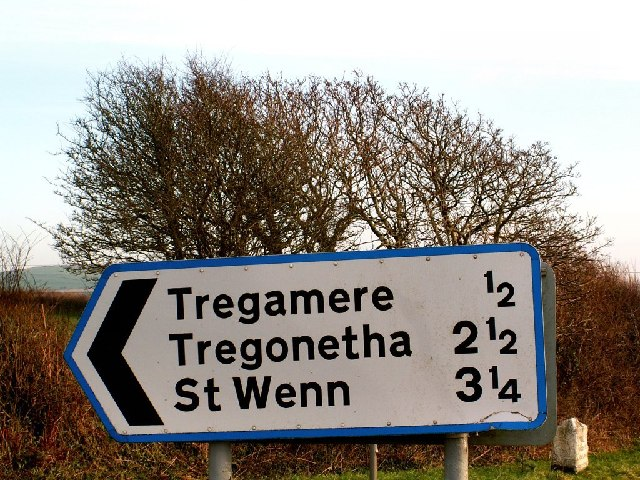
Road distance signs in the United Kingdom use miles.

The Weights and Measures Act 1878 effectively prohibited the use of metric weights for trade, the United Kingdom having declined to sign the Convention of the Metre three years previously. The standard imperial yard was not stable – in 1947 its rate of shrinkage was quantified and found to be one part per million every 23 years. In April 1884 HJ Chaney, Warden of Standards in London unofficially contacted the BIPM (custodians of the standard metre) inquiring whether the BIPM would calibrate some metre standards that had been manufactured in the United Kingdom. Broch, director of the BIPM replied that he was not authorised to perform any such calibrations for non-member states. On 17 September 1884, the British Government signed the convention on behalf of the United Kingdom. The Weights and Measures Act 1897 authorized the use of metric units for trade; a list of metric to imperial equivalents being published the following year.

Under the Weights and Measures Act 1824 custody of the standard yard and pound and custody of the administration of weights and measures was entrusted to the Exchequer but verification was administered locally. The Weights and Measures Act 1835 formally described the office and duties of Inspectors of Weights and Measures and required every borough to appoint such officers and the Standards of Weights, Measures, and Coinage Act 1866 passed responsibility for weights and measures to the Board of Trade. In 1900 the Board of Trade established the National Physical Laboratory (NPL) to provide laboratory facilities for weights and measures.

After the passage of the Weights and Measures (Metric System) Act 1897, weights and measures in the United Kingdom remained relatively unchanged until after the Second World War. By the middle of the century the difference of 2 parts per million between the British and US standard yards was causing problems—in 1900 a tolerance of 10 parts per million was adequate for science, but by 1950 this tolerance had shrunk to 0.25 parts per million. In 1960 representatives from the NPL and other national laboratories from the United States and Commonwealth agreed to redefine the yard as being exactly 0.9144 metres, an action that was ratified by the British Government as part of the Weights and Measures Act 1963.

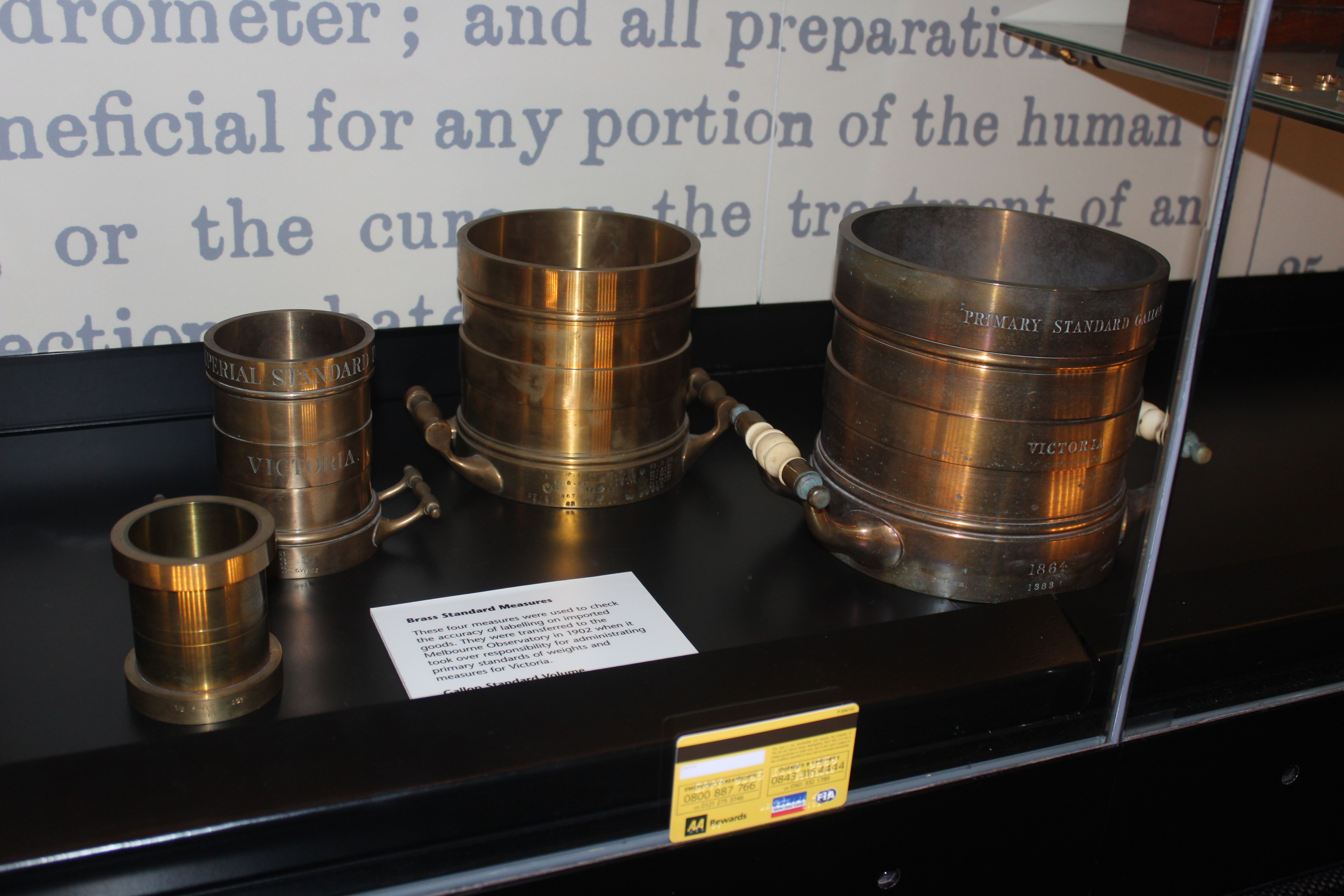
Standards for the gallon, half gallon, quart and pint formerly used in the Colony of Victoria. Now part of the National Archives of Australia.

Metrication in the United Kingdom began in the mid-1960s. Initially this metrication was voluntary and by 1985 many traditional and imperial units of measure had been voluntarily removed from use in the retail trade. The Weights and Measures Act 1985 formalized their removal for use in trade, though imperial units were retained for use on road signs and the most common imperial weights such as the foot, inch, pound, ounce, gallon and pint continued to be used in the retail trade for the sale of loose goods or goods measured or weighed in front of the customer. (Note: The Weights and Measures Act 1985 excluded from use for trade the bushell, cental, chain, drachm, dram, fluid drachm, furlong, grain, hundredweight, ounce apoth., peck, pennyweight, quarter, quintal, rood, scruple, stone, ton, the square mile, cubic inch, cubic foot, cubic yard, and the term 'metric ton') Since 1 January 2000 it has been unlawful to use imperial units for weights and measures in retail trade in the United Kingdom except as supplementary units or for the sale of draught beer and cider by the pint or milk that is sold in returnable containers.

=== British Empire ===
When colonies attained dominion status, they also attained the right to control their own systems of weights and measures. Many adopted the imperial system of units with local variations. India and Hong Kong supplemented the imperial system of units with their own indigenous units of measure, parts of Canada and South Africa included land survey units of measure from earlier colonial masters in their systems of measure while many territories used only a subset of the units used in the United Kingdom—in particular the stone, quarter and cental were not catalogued in, amongst others, Australian, Canadian and Indian legislation. Furthermore, Canada aligned her ton with US measures by cataloguing the ton of 2000 lb as being legal for trade, but kept the imperial gallon.

The standardization of the yard in 1960 required not only agreement between the United States and the United Kingdom, but also of Canada, Australia, New Zealand and South Africa, all of whom had their own standards laboratories.

== United States customary units ==
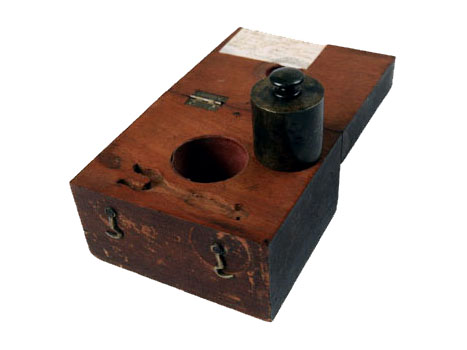
Pound Troy constructed by the Office of Weights and Measures in the Coast Survey – c. 1832–1839

Prior to the United States Declaration of Independence in 1776, the Thirteen Colonies that were to become the United States used the English system of measurement. The Articles of Confederation, which predated the Constitution, gave the central government "the sole and exclusive right and power of...fixing the Standard of Weights and Measures throughout the United States." Subsequent to the formation of the United States, the Constitution reaffirmed the power of Congress to "fix the Standard of Weights and Measures" but reserved the power to regulate intrastate commerce and weights and measures to the individual states.

During the First Congress of the United States in 1789, Thomas Jefferson was detailed to draw up a plan for the currency and weights of measures that would be used in the new republic. In his 1790 response he noted that the existing system of measure was sound but that control of the base artefact was not under the control of the United States. His report suggested a means of manufacturing a local standard and also left the way open for an adoption of a decimal-based system should this be appropriate. In the event, the existing standards were retained.

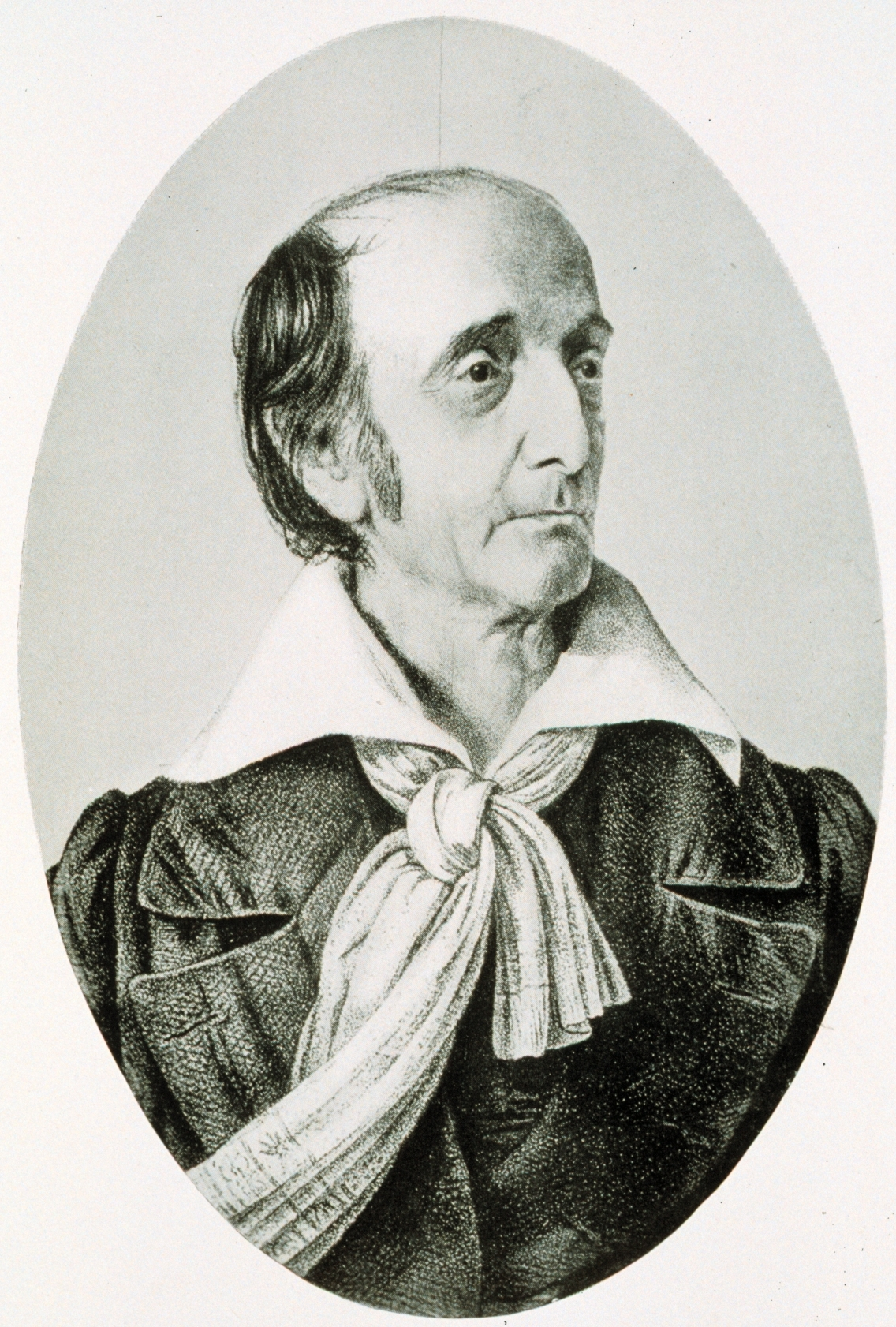
Ferdinand Hassler who acquired standard weights in Europe on behalf of the US Treasury

For many years no action was taken at the federal level to ensure harmony in units of measure – the units acquired by the early colonists appeared to serve their purpose. Congress did nothing, but Ferdinand Hassler, Superintendent of the East Coast survey, who in 1790 had met using contacts in his native Switzerland acquired a copy of the [French] mètre des Archives. In 1810 Ferdinand Hassler was dispatched to Europe by the Treasury to acquire measuring instruments and standards.

In 1827 Albert Gallatin, United States minister at London acquired an "exact copy" of the troy pound held by the British Government which in 1828 was adopted as the reference copy of weight in the United States.

In 1821 John Quincy Adams, then Secretary of State submitted a report based on research commissioned by the Senate in 1817 which recommended against adoption of the metric system. Congress did nothing and in 1832 the Treasury adopted the yard of 36 inches as the unit of length for customs purposes, the avoirdupois pound of 7000 grains as the unit of weight and the gallon of 231 cubic inches (the "Queen Anne gallon") and the bushel of 2150.42 cubic inches as the units of volume. Congress did little to promote standards across the United States other than fixing the size of the yard and the gallon.

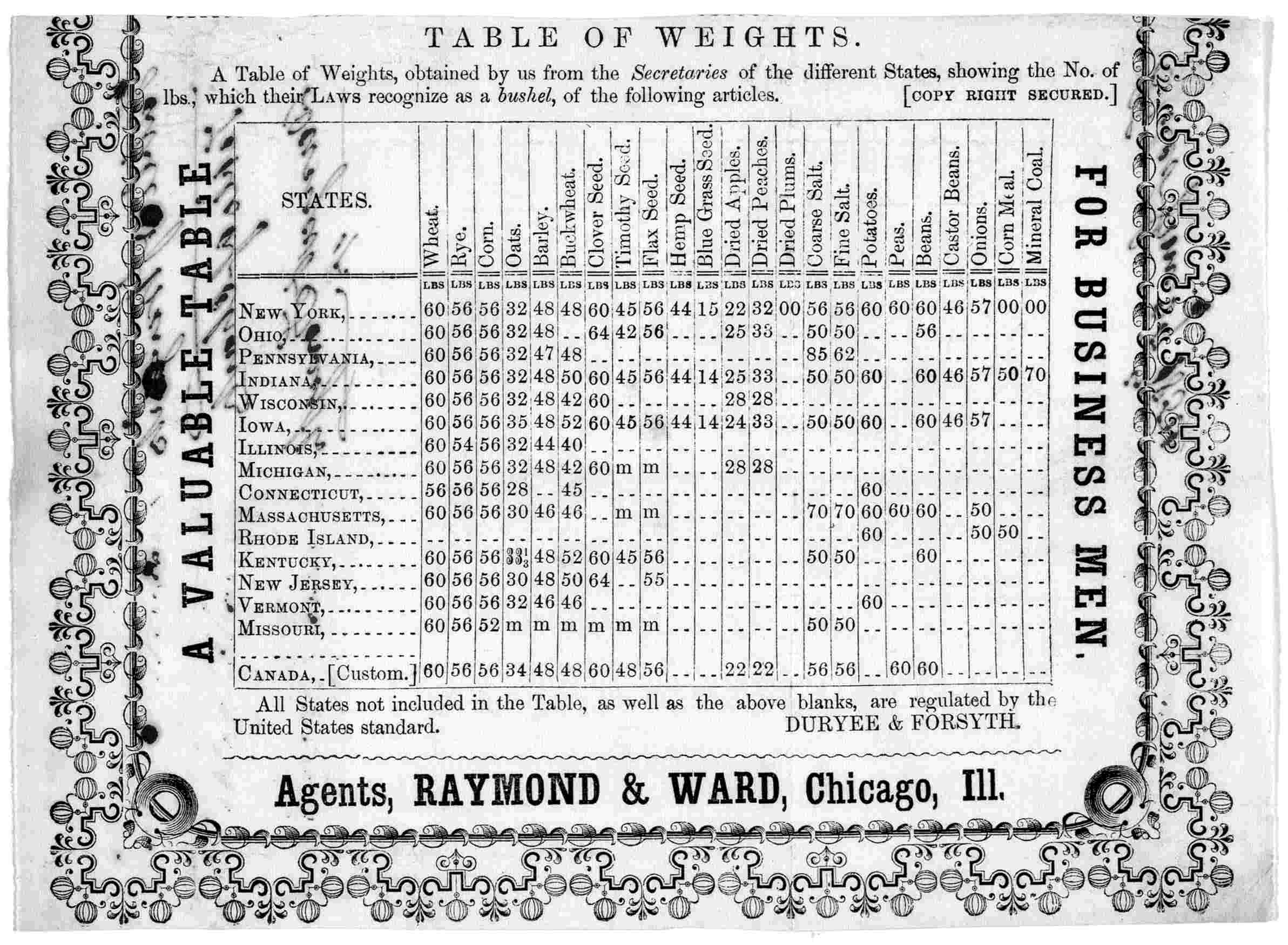
Nineteenth century list of various bushels by state and commodity

Throughout the nineteenth century individual states developed their own standards and in particular a variety of bushels based on weight (mass) rather than volume emerged, dependent on both commodity and state. This lack of uniformity crippled inter-state trade and in 1905 the National Bureau of Standards called a meeting of the states to discuss the lack of uniform standards and in many cases, a means of regulatory oversight. A meeting was held the following year and subsequently became an annual gathering known as the National Conference on Weights and Measures (NCWM). In 1915 the conference published its first model standards. The bushel was not fully standardized and the Chicago Mercantile Exchange still (May 2013) uses different bushels for different commodities—a bushel of corn being 56 lb, a bushel of oats 38 lb and a bushel of soybeans 60 lb and a bushel of red winter wheat (both hard and soft) also 60 lb. Other commodities at the exchange are reckoned in pounds, in short tons or in metric tons.

One of the actions taken by Congress was to permit the use of the metric system in trade (1866), made at the height of the metrication process in Latin America. Other actions were to ratify the Metre Convention in 1875 and under the Mendenhall Order of 1893, to redefine the pound and the yard in terms of the international prototype of the kilogram and the international prototype of the metre respectively.

In 1901 the administration of weights and measures was handed to a federal agency, the National Bureau of Standards, which in 1988 became the National Institute of Standards and Technology. Inactivity by Congress and the lack of uniformity of weights and measures which were crippling US economic growth in the nineteenth century led to the National Bureau of Standards to call a meeting of states in 1905 which resulted in the setting up of the National Conference on Weights and Measures (NCWM). This organisation is the de facto controlling body for weights and measures in the United States, though in respect of international relations such as membership of the General Conference on Weights and Measures (an intergovernmental organization) the US Government itself has to take the lead.

During the twentieth century the principal change in the customary system of weights and measures was an agreement between NIST and the corresponding bodies in Australia, Canada, New Zealand, South Africa and the United Kingdom, signed in 1960, that redefined the yard and the pound in terms of the metre and the kilogram respectively. These new units became known as the international yard and pound. Congress has neither endorsed nor repudiated this action. (See § Metric equivalents).

== Energy, power, and temperature ==
Three approaches to units of mass and force or weight
Base	Force		Weight		Mass			
2nd law of motion	F = m ⋅ a		F = (W ⋅ a)/g		m = F/a			
System	BG	GM	EE	M	AE	CGS	MTS	SI
Acceleration (a)	ft/s^{2}	m/s^{2}	ft/s^{2}	m/s^{2}	ft/s^{2}	Gal	m/s^{2}	m/s^{2}
Mass (m)	slug	hyl	pound-mass	kilogram	pound	gram	tonne	kilogram
Force (F), weight (W)	pound	kilopond	pound-force	kilopond	poundal	dyne	sthène	newton
Pressure (p)	pound per square inch	technical atmosphere	pound-force per square inch	standard atmosphere	poundal per square foot	barye	pieze	pascal

Imperial and US customary units have long been used in many branches of engineering. Two of the earliest such units of measure to come into use were the horsepower and the degree Fahrenheit. The horsepower was defined by James Watt in 1782 as the power required to raise 33,000 pounds of water through a height of one foot in one minute (Note: The horsepower is now defined as the power required to raise 550 pounds of water a distance of one foot in one second.) and the degree Fahrenheit was first defined by Daniel Fahrenheit in about 1713 as being a temperature scale having its lower calibration point (0 °F) at temperature where a supersaturated salt/ice mixture froze and its upper calibration point at body temperature (96 °F). In 1777 the Royal Society, under the chairmanship of Henry Cavendish, proposed the definition of the Fahrenheit scale be modified such that the temperature corresponding to the melting point of ice be 32 °F (0 °C) and the boiling point of water under standard atmospheric conditions be 212 °F (100 °C).

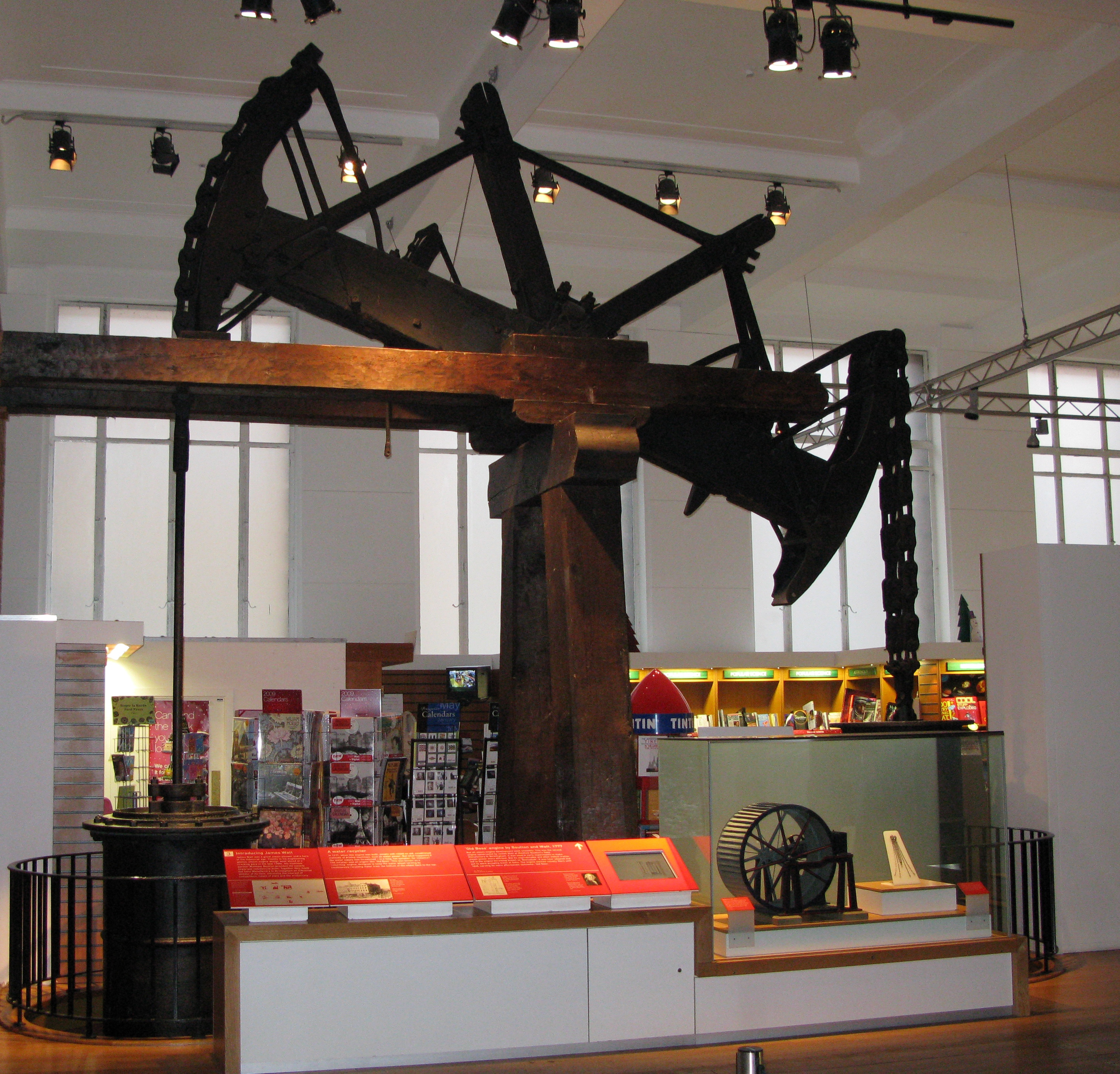
Old Bess, a 30 HP beam engine built by James Watt, now preserved in the Science Museum, London. Watt defined the term horsepower.

The British thermal unit (Btu) is defined as the heat needed to raise the temperature of one pound of water by one degree Fahrenheit. It was in use before 1859 as a unit of heat based on imperial units rather than the metric units used by the French—Clément-Desormes having defined the calorie in terms of the kilogram and degrees Celsius ('centigrade') in 1824.

In 1873 a committee of the British Association for the Advancement of Science under the chairmanship of William Thomson (Lord Kelvin) introduced the concept of coherence into units of measure and proposed the names dyne and erg as the units of force and work in the CGS system of units. (Note: These units are defined as follows: The dyne is the force needed to accelerate a mass of 1 g by 1 cm/s^{2}.; The erg is the work done when a mass of 1 g is moved a distance of 1 cm when opposed by a force of 1 dyne; Since all the constants in these relationships is unity, the units are said to be coherent.) Two years later James Thomson, older brother of William Thomson, introduced the term poundal as a coherent unit of force in the Foot–pound–second system (FPS) of measurement. The FPS unit of work is the foot-poundal.

Other systems for the measurement of dynamic quantities that used imperial and US customary units are the British Gravitational System (BG) proposed by Arthur Mason Worthington and the English Engineering System (EE). Both systems depend on the gravitational acceleration, and use the pound-force as the unit of force but use different approaches when applying Newton's laws of motion. In the BG system, force, rather than mass has a base unit while the slug is a derived unit of inertia (rather than mass). On the other hand, the EE system uses a different approach and introduces the acceleration due to gravity (g) into its equations. Both these approaches led to slight variations in the meaning of the pound-force (and also of the kilogram-force) in different parts of the world. Various countries published standard values that should be used for g, and in 1901 the CGPM published a standard value for g that should be used in the "International Service of Weights and Measures", namely 32.174049 ft/s^{2} (9.80665 m/s^{2}), which is equal to the value of g at 45° latitude.

Newton's second law in these systems becomes:

BG: Force (lbf) = inertia (slugs) × acceleration (ft/s^{2})
EE: Force (lbf) = mass (lb) × acceleration (ft/s^{2}) ÷ g
AE: Force (poundals) = mass (lb) × acceleration (ft/s^{2})

AE is ignored in many engineering courses and textbooks while some, such as Darby only uses EE (alongside SI), having described the BG and EE systems as "archaic".

== Metric equivalents ==
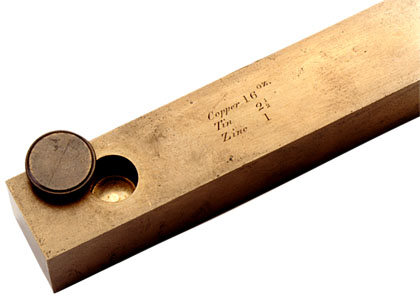
End of the standard yard of 1855 showing the gold plugs which bore the markings for the standard yard

The standard yard and [Troy] pound were lost in 1834 when a fire partially destroyed the Palace of Westminster. Following a report published in 1841 by a commission, a new standard yard and pound were manufactured using the best available secondary sources. Unlike the previous standard, the new pound standard, made of platinum, was a pound avoirdupois. The new yard, slightly longer than a yard to prevent wear as was experienced with the mètre des Archives, was made of brass and had two gold plugs close to its end. Scratch marks on the plugs denoted the length of the yard. They were accepted by an Act of Parliament as the standards for length and weight in 1855. Following the debacle over the different gallons that had been adopted by the United States and the United Kingdom thirty years earlier, one of the copies of the standard yard and avoirdupois pound (known in the United States as the "Mint pound") was offered to and accepted by the United States government.

In the years that followed the passing of the 1878 act, the standard imperial yard was found to be shrinking at a rate, confirmed in 1950, to be nearly one part per million every 30 years. On the other hand, the international prototype metre, manufactured from a platinum-iridium alloy rather than brass by a British firm, which in 1889 replaced the mètre des Archives as the standard for the metre, was found to be more stable than the standard yard. Both the United States and the United Kingdom, as signatories of the Metre Convention, took delivery of copies of both the standard metre and the standard kilogram. The "Mint pound" was also found to be of poor workmanship.

In 1866 the United States government legalised use of metric units in contract law, defining them in terms of the equivalent customary units to five significant figures, which was sufficient for purposes of trade. In 1893, under the Mendenhall Order the United States abandoned the 1855 yard as a standard of length and the "Mint pound" as a standard of mass, redefining them in terms of the metre and kilogram using the values of the 1866 legislation. In the United Kingdom fresh comparisons of the imperial and metric standards of length and mass were made and were used in the Weights and Measures (Metric System) Act 1897 (60 & 61 Vict. c. 46) to redefine the yard and pound in terms of the metre and kilogram respectively. In addition, the definitions of both the yard and the pound in terms of the artifacts held by the British government was reaffirmed giving both the yard and the pound two different definitions. The differences between the British and the US yard and pound was of the order of a few parts per million.

Metric Equivalents (1890s)
United States Mendenhall Order (1893)	United Kingdom Weights and Measures Act (1897)	Difference parts per million
1 metre = 39.37 inches	1 metre = 1.0936143 yards	2.9
1 kilogram = 2.2046 pounds	1 kilogram = 2.2046223 pounds	10.1

By the end of the Second World War, the standards laboratories of Canada, Australia, New Zealand and South Africa also had their own copies of the pound and the yard. These legal and technical discrepancies, described by McGreevy (pg 290) as being "unsound" led to the Commonwealth Science Conference of 1946. proposing that the Commonwealth countries and the United States should all redefine the yard and the pound in terms of an agreed fraction of the metre and kilogram respectively. Agreement was reached by the standards laboratories in 1960 to redefine the yard and the pound as

1 international yard = 0.9144metres
1 international pound = 0.453592 37kilograms

The final digit of the value chosen for the pound was chosen so as to make the number divisible by 7 without a repeating decimal, making the grain exactly 64.79891milligrams.

This agreement was ratified by the United Kingdom in 1963 while Canada pre-empted the decision by adopting these values in 1951, nine years ahead of the full international agreement. The United States Congress has neither ratified nor repudiated the agreement.

== Comparison of imperial and US customary systems ==
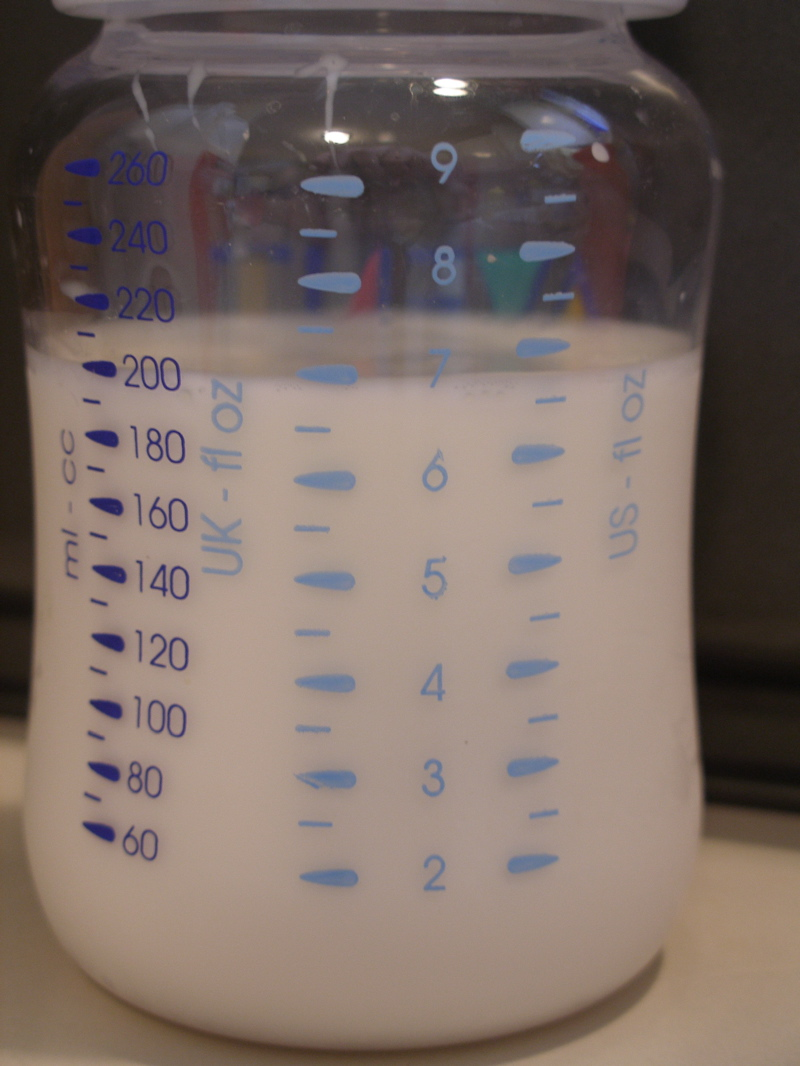
A baby bottle that measures in all three measurement systems—metric, imperial (UK), and US customary.

Prior to 1960 the imperial and customary yard and the pound were sufficiently close to each other (Note: The imperial and customary miles differed by about one eighth of an inch and the imperial and customary short tons by less than an eighth of an ounce.) that for most practical purposes the differences in the sizes of units of length, area, volume and mass could be disregarded, though there were differences in usage - for example, in the United States short road distances are specified in feet while in the United Kingdom they are specified in yards The introduction of the international yard in 1960 caused small but noticeable effects in surveying in the United States which resulted in some states retaining the original definitions of the customary units of measure which are now known as the survey mile, foot, while other states adopted the international foot. According to the National Institute of Standards and Technology, the survey foot is obsolete as of January 1, 2023, and its use is discouraged.

The definition of units of weight above a pound differed between the customary and the imperial system - the imperial system employed the stone of 14 pounds, the hundredweight of 8 stone (Note: In this context, the plural is "stone", not "stones") and the ton of 2240 pounds (20 hundredweight), while the customary system of units did not employ the stone but has a hundredweight of 100 pounds and a ton of 2000 pounds. In international trade, the ton of 2240 pounds was often referred to as the "long ton" and the ton of 2000 pounds as the "short ton". When using customary units, it is usual to express body weight in pounds, but when using imperial units, to use stones and pounds.

In his Plan for Establishing Uniformity in the Coinage, Weights, and Measures of the United States, Thomas Jefferson, then secretary of state, identified 14 different gallons in English statutes varying in size from 224 to 282 cubic inches (3.67 to 4.62 litres).

In 1832, in the absence of any direction by Congress, the United States Treasury chose the second smallest gallon, the "Queen Anne gallon" of 231 cubic inches (3.785 litres), to be the official gallon in the United States for fiscal purposes. Sixteen US fluid ounces make a US pint (8 pints equals 1 gallon in both customary and imperial systems).

During the reform of weights and measures legislation in the United Kingdom in 1824, old gallons were replaced by the new imperial gallon, which was defined to be the volume of 10 pounds of water at 62 °F (17 °C), and was determined experimentally to be 277.42 cubic inches (4.54609 litres). Twenty imperial fluid ounces make an imperial pint, the imperial fluid ounce being 0.96 US fluid ounces.

The US Customary system of units makes use of set of dry units of capacity that have a similar set of names (Note: NIST does not catalogue a "dry gallon" in its list of US units of measure.) to those of liquid capacity, though different volumes: the dry pint having a volume of 33.6 cubic inches (550 ml) against the US fluid pint's volume of 28.875 cubic inches (473 ml) and the imperial pint of 34.68 cubic inches (568 ml). The imperial system of measure does not have an equivalent to the US customary system of "dry measure".

In the international commodities markets, the barrel (42USgallons, ≈159 litres) is used in both London and New York/Chicago for trading in crude oil and the troy ounce (≈31.10 grams) for trading in precious metals, except the London markets use metric units and the Chicago Board of Trade uses customary units.

== Units in use ==
The tables below catalogue the imperial units of measure that were permitted for use in trade in the United Kingdom on the eve of metrication (1976) and the customary "units of measurement that have traditionally been used in the United States". In addition, named units of measure that are used in the engineering industry are also catalogued. Prior to metrication, the units of measure used in Ireland were the same as those used in the United Kingdom while those used in the British Commonwealth and in South Africa were in most cases a subset of those used in the United Kingdom with, in certain cases, local differences.

Unless otherwise specified, the units of measure quoted below were used in both the United States, the United Kingdom. The SI equivalents are quoted to four significant figures.

=== Units of length ===
In 1893 the United States fixed the yard at 3600/3937 metres, making the yard 0.9144018 metres and 1896 the British authorities fixed the yard as being 0.9143993 metres. At the time the discrepancy of about two parts per million was considered to be insignificant. In 1960, the United Kingdom, United States, Australia, Canada and South Africa standardised their units of length by defining the "international yard" as being 0.9144 metres exactly. This change affected land surveyors in the United States and led to the old units being renamed "survey feet", "survey miles" etc. However the introduction of the metric-based Ordnance Survey National Grid in the United Kingdom in 1938 meant that British surveyors were unaffected by the change.

Linear measure
Unit	Abbreviation	Definition	SI equivalent
inch	in or ″ (Note: Shall be a double prime symbol, but often approximated as ", a double quotation mark.)		25.4 mm (Note: Exact conversion)
foot	ft or ′ (Note: Shall be a prime symbol, but often approximated as ', a single quotation mark.)	12 inches	304.8 mm
yard	yd	3 feet	0.9144 m
chain^{UK}		22 yards	20.117 m
furlong^{UK}	fur	220 yards	201.17 m
mile (Note: Known as the "international mile" in the United States)		1760 yards	1609.3 m

Notes

Survey measure (US only)
Unit	Abbreviation	Definition	SI equivalent
link	li	0.01 chains	201.1 mm
survey foot	ft or ′		1200/3937 m (Note: Exact conversion) (Note: 1 Survey foot ≈ 1.000002 international feet)
rod, pole or perch	rd	16 1/2 feet (Note: Survey feet)	5.029 m
chain	ch	66 feet	20.117 m
furlong	fur	660 feet	201.17 m
US Statute mile	mi	5280 feet	1609.3 m

=== Units of area ===
The introduction of the international yard in 1960 had no effect on British measurements of area, however US measurements of land area, as opposed to other measurements of area (such as pounds per square inch) continued to be based on the US statute yard.

Area
Unit	Abbreviation	Definition	SI equivalent
Square foot	sq ft or ft^{2}		0.09290 m^{2}
Square yard	sq yd or yd^{2}	9 sq ft	0.8361 m^{2}
Acre^{UK}		4840 sq yd	4046 m^{2}

Notes

Land area in the US
Unit	Abbreviation	Definition	SI equivalent
Square rod	sq rd or rd^{2}	272 1/4 sq ft (Note: Survey feet)	25.29 m^{2}
Acre		43560 sq ft	4046 m^{2}
Square mile	sq mi or mi^{2}	640 acres	2.590 km^{2}
Township		36 sq mi	93.24 km^{2}

=== Volume of dry goods ===
Dry volume (US)
Unit	Abbreviation	Definition	SI equivalent
Cubic inch	cu in or in^{3}		16.38 cm^{3}
Cubic foot	ft^{3} or ft^{3}	1728 in^{3}	0.02831 m^{3}
Cubic yard	cu yd or yd^{3}	27 ft^{3}	0.7646 m^{3}

Notes

Dry volume (US)
Unit	Abbreviation	Definition	SI equivalent
dry pint	pt	33.6 in^{3}	550.6 cm^{3}
dry quart	qt	2 pt	1.101 L
dry peck	pk	8 qt	8.810 L
bushel	bu	4 pk	35.24 L

=== Volume of liquids ===
Imperial/US gallons
United States	231 in^{3}	3.785412 L
United Kingdom	277.419 in^{3}	4.54609 L

Several of the units of liquid volume have similar names, but have different volumes – and in the case of fluid ounces and pints, different relations. In addition the definitions of the imperial and US gallons are based on different concepts – the imperial gallon is defined in terms of the volume occupied by a specified mass of water, while the US gallon is specified in terms of cubic linear measurement.

Volume (UK)
Unit	Abbrev	Definition	SI equivalent	US equivalent
Gallon	gal	4.54609 L (Note: This is the definition of the imperial gallon and is therefore exact.)		1.201 US gal
Pint	pt	1/8 gal	568.26 ml	1.201 US pt

Notes

Volume (US)
Unit	Abbrev	Definition	SI equivalent	UK equivalent
Gallon	gal	231 in^{3} (Note: This is the definition of the gallon and is therefore exact.)	3.785 L	0.8327 imp gal
Quart	qt	1/4 gal	946.4 mL	0.8327 imp qt
Pint	pt	1/2 qt	473.2 mL	0.8327 imp pt
Fluid ounce	fl oz	1/16 pt	29.57 mL	1.041 imp fl oz
Fluid dram	fl dr	1/8 fl oz	3.6967 mL	1.041 imp fl dr
Minim		1/60 fl dr	61.61 μL	1.041 imp fl minim

=== Units of mass ===
Imperial/US pounds
United States	0.4535924277kg
United Kingdom	0.453592338kg
International	0.45359237kg

Units of mass in both the imperial and US customary system have always used the same standard, though differences in multiples of the avoirdupois pound developed in the nineteenth century. Both systems used three scales – avoirdupois for general use, troy for precious metals, and apothecaries for medicine.

==== Avoirdupois ====
Avoirdupois (general use)
Unit	Abbreviation	Definition	SI equivalent
Ounce	oz	16 dr 437 1/2 gn	28.35 g
Pound	lb	16 oz 7000 gn	453.6 g (Note: 1 lb is defined as 0.45359237 kg)
Stone^{UK}	st	14 lb	6.350 kg
Ton^{US}		2000 lb	907.2 kg

==== Troy ====
Troy (precious metals)
Unit	Abbreviation	SI equivalent
Troy ounce	oz t	31.10 g

==== Apothecary ====
Apothecary mass were used in the pharmaceutical industry and have remained almost unchanged since the Middle Ages – the apothecary pound and ounce being the same as the troy pound and ounce, but each system having different divisions. In the United Kingdom, they were replaced by metric units in 1970.

Apothecaries (medicinal use)
Unit	Abbreviation	Definition	SI equivalent
Grain			64.80 mg
Scruple	℈	20 grains	1.296 g
Dram	ʒ	3 ℈	3.8879346 g
Ounce	℥	8 ʒ	31.10 g
Pound	℔	12 ℥ 5760 gn	373.2 g

=== Energy, power, and temperature ===
The names of most derived units of measure in the imperial and US customary systems are concatenations of the constituent parts of the unit of measure, for example the unit of pressure is the pounds [force] per square inch. Apart from the poundal, most of the named units of measure are non-coherent, but were adopted due to traditional working practice. (Note: For example, horsepower.)

Energy, power, and temperature
Quantity	Unit	Abbrev	System	Definition	SI equivalent
Force	poundal	pdl	FPS	Force required to accelerate a mass of one pound-mass by 1 ft/s^{2}	0.1383 N
Force	pound force	lbf	BGS, EEU	Force exerted on a mass of one pound due to gravity	4.448 N
Mass	slug		BGS	mass which, when subjected to a force of one pound-force, accelerates by 1 ft/sec^{2}	14.59 kg
Mass	pound-mass	lbm	EEU	mass which, when subjected to a force of one pound-force, accelerates by g ft/sec^{2} (32.17 ft/sec^{2})	0.4536 kg
Power	horsepower	hp	EEU	Power required to raise 550 lb at the rate of 1 ft/s against gravity	745.7 W
Energy	British thermal unit	BTU	FPS, BGS, EEU	Energy required to raise the temperature of 1 lb liquid water by 1 °F (5/9 °C)	1055 J
Temperature	degree Fahrenheit	°F	FPS, BGS, EEU		9/5 °C + 32

=== Other units ===
In addition to those catalogued above, there are hundreds of other units of measurement in both the imperial and the US customary system of measurement – many are specific to a particular industry of application. Such units could, in theory, be replaced by general units of the same dimension, for example the barrel (42 US gallons, 34.97 imperial gallons or 159.0 litres) used in the oil industry has the dimension of volume and could be replaced by the cubic metre or litre.

The definitions of potential difference (volt), electric current (ampere), electrical resistance (ohm) were defined in terms of metric units, international agreement having been reached at a series of IEC Congress in Chicago between 1881 and 1906 when the electrical industry started. At that time, the metric system had become established in continental Europe while an issue in the United Kingdom. Similarly, the radiological units of measurement were defined in terms of metric units, agreement first having been reached at the second International Congress of Radiology at Stockholm (1928).

== Current status ==
Countries using the metric, imperial and US customary systems as of 2019

In the 1960s a metrication program was initiated in most English-speaking countries, resulting in either the partial or total displacement of the imperial system or the US customary system of measure in those countries. The current status of imperial and US customary units, as summarised by NIST, is that "the SI metric system is now the official system of units in the United Kingdom, while the customary units are still predominantly used in the United States".

The situation is however not as clear-cut as this. In the United States, for example, the metric system is the predominant system of measure in certain fields such as automobile manufacture even though customary units are used in aircraft manufacture. In the United Kingdom, metric units are required for almost all regulated (Note: In this context, "Regulated use" means the uses specified in the Units of Measurement Regulations 2009, namely "economic, health, safety, or administrative purposes") use of units of measure except for a few specifically exempt areas such as road signs, speedometers and draught beer. Metrication is also all but complete in the Commonwealth countries of Australia, India, New Zealand and South Africa; metrication in Canada has displaced the imperial system in many areas.

The imperial and US customary systems of measurement use the SI for their formal definitions, the yard being defined as 0.9144 metres exactly, the pound avoirdupois as 0.45359237 kilograms exactly while both systems of measure share the definition of the second.

== See also ==
- Conversion of units
- Metrication
