= Foot-poundal =

Unit of energy

The foot-poundal (symbol: ft·pdl) is a unit of energy, introduced in 1879, that is part of the Absolute English system of units, which itself is a coherent subsystem of the foot–pound–second system.

The foot-poundal is equal to 1/32.174049 that of the more commonly used foot-pound force.

== Conversions ==
1 foot-poundal is equivalent to:

- 0.031081 ft⋅lb_{f}
- 0.0421401100938048 J (exactly)
- 421401.100938048 erg (exactly)
- 0.0004 BTU_{IT}
- 0.010065 cal_{IT} or 0.000 010 65 "food calorie" (kcal or Cal)
- 0.37297 inch-pound force (in⋅lb_{f})
- 5.96752 inch-ounce force (in⋅oz_{f})

== See also ==
- Poundal
- Foot-pound (energy)
- Pound-force
- Slug (unit)
- Units of energy
