= Pound-foot =

Unit of torque

pound-foot
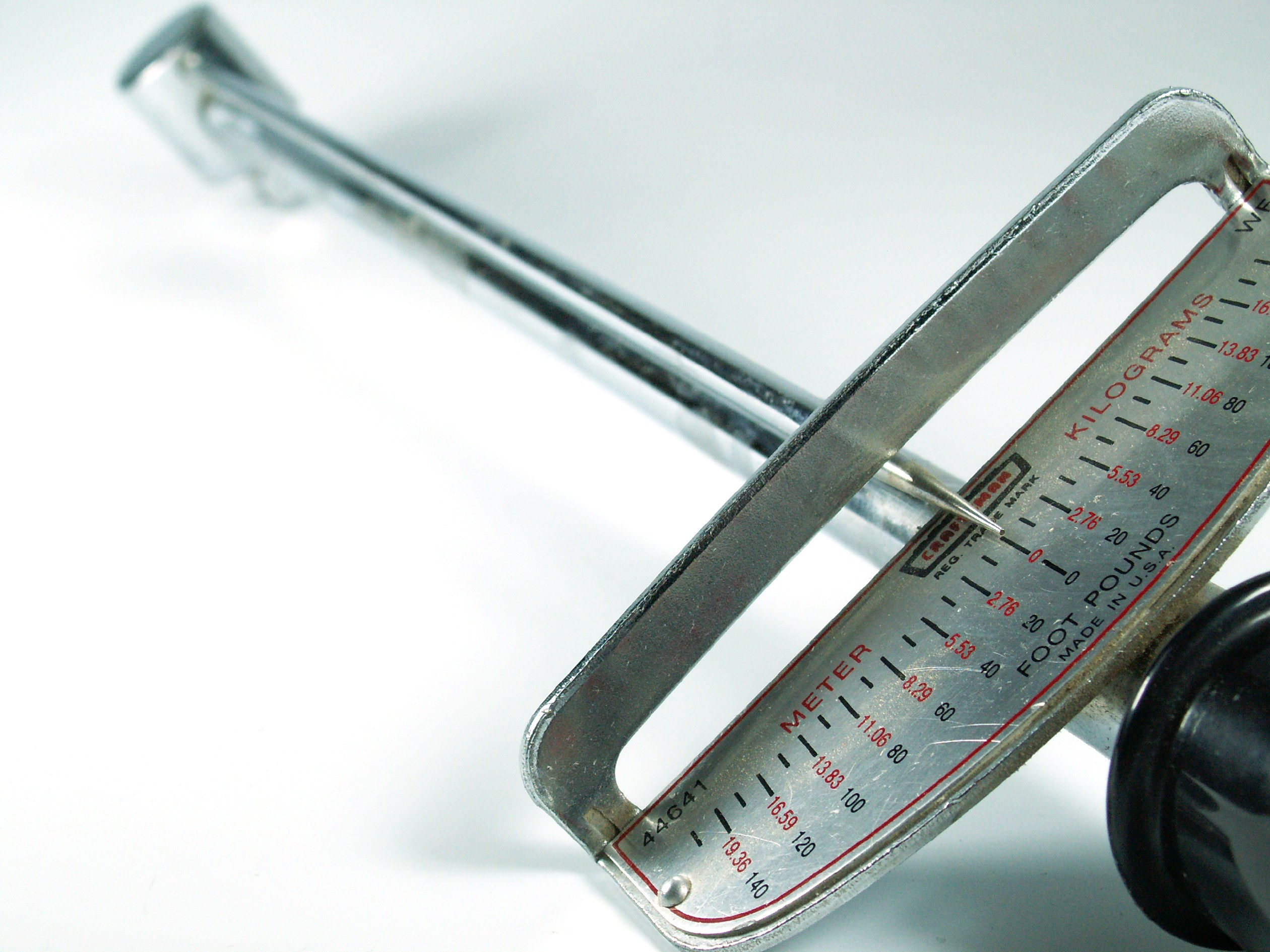
- Pound-foot and kilogram-force-metre are displayed on this torque wrench.

General information
- Unit system: British Gravitational System, English Engineering Units
- Unit of: Torque
- Symbol: lbf⋅ft, lb-ft

Conversions
1 lbf⋅ft in ...	... is equal to ...
- SI units: ≈ 1.355818 N⋅m
- Gravitational metric system: ≈ 0.1382550 kgf⋅m

A pound-foot (lb⋅ft), abbreviated from pound-force foot (lbf·ft), is a unit of torque representing one pound of force acting at a perpendicular distance of one foot from a pivot point. Conversely one foot pound-force (ft·lbf) is the moment about an axis that applies one pound-force at a radius of one foot.

== Unit ==
The value in Système International (SI) units is given by multiplying the following exact factors:

- One pound (mass) = 0.45359237 kilograms;
- Standard gravity = 9.80665 m/s^{2}; and
- One foot = 0.3048 m.

This gives the exact conversion factor,

- One pound-foot = 1.3558179483314004 newton metres.

The name "pound-foot", intended to minimize confusion with the foot-pound as a unit of work, was apparently first proposed by British physicist Arthur Mason Worthington.

Despite this, in practice torque units are commonly called the foot-pound (denoted as either lb-ft or ft-lb) or the inch-pound (denoted as in-lb). Practitioners depend on context and the hyphenated abbreviations to know that these refer to neither energy nor moment of mass (as the symbol ft-lb rather than lbf-ft would imply).

Similarly, a pound-inch (or inch-pound) is the torque of one pound of force applied to one inch of distance from the pivot, and is equal to 1/12 lbf⋅ft (0.1129848 N⋅m). It is commonly used on torque wrenches and torque screwdrivers for setting specific fastener tension. An ounce-inch (or inch-ounce) is a smaller unit, equal to 1/16 of a pound-inch, or 0.7062 newton-centimetres (7.062 millinewton-metres).

== See also ==
- Kilogram metre (torque) (kgf⋅m)
