= Foot-pound =

Unit of energy

- Unit system: English engineering units and British gravitational system
- Unit of: Energy
- Symbol: ft⋅lbf, ft⋅lb

Conversions
1 ft⋅lbf in ...	... is equal to ...
- SI units: 1.355818 J
- CGS units: 13,558,180 erg

The foot-pound force (symbol: ft⋅lbf, ft⋅lb_{f}, or ft⋅lb) is a unit of work or energy in the engineering and gravitational systems in United States customary and imperial units of measure. It is the energy transferred upon applying a force of one pound-force (lbf) through a linear displacement of one foot. The corresponding SI unit is the joule, equal to 0.737562 foot-pounds.

== Usage ==
The term foot-pound is also used as a unit of torque (see pound-foot (torque)). In the United States this is often used to specify, for example, the tightness of a fastener (such as screws and nuts) or the output of an engine. Although they are dimensionally equivalent, energy (a scalar) and torque (a Euclidean vector) are distinct physical quantities. Both energy and torque can be expressed as a product of a force vector with a displacement vector (hence pounds and feet); energy is the scalar product of the two, and torque is the vector product.

Although calling the torque unit "pound-foot" has been academically suggested, both are still commonly called "foot-pound" in colloquial usage. To avoid confusion, it is not uncommon for people to specify each as "foot-pound of energy" or "foot-pound of torque" respectively.

In small arms ballistics and particularly in the United States, the foot-pound is often used to specify the muzzle energy of a bullet.

== Conversion factors ==
=== Energy ===
1 foot pound-force is equivalent to:

- 1.355818 joules or newton-metres
- 13,558,180 ergs
- 1.285067×10^{−3} British thermal units
- 0.3240483 calories
- 8.462350×10^{18} electronvolts = 8.462350×10^{9} gigaelectronvolts

=== Power ===
1 foot pound-force per second is equivalent to:

- 1.355818 watts
- 1.818182×10^{−3} horsepower

Related conversions:

- 1 watt ≈ 44.25373 ft⋅lbf/min ≈ 0.7375621 ft⋅lbf/s
- 1 horsepower (mechanical) = 33,000 ft⋅lbf/min = 550 ft⋅lbf/s

== See also ==
- Conversion of units
- Pound-foot (torque)
- Poundal
- Slug (unit)
- Units of energy
