= English units =

English units may refer to:

- English units of measurement, the units of measurement used in England up to 1826
- Imperial and US customary measurement systems, an overview of both UK and US non-metric units
- Imperial units, the measurement system used in the UK from 1826
- United States customary units, the measurement system commonly used in the US
- English Engineering Units, the measurement system used in some fields of engineering in the US
