= Jupiter radius =

Unit of length in astronomy

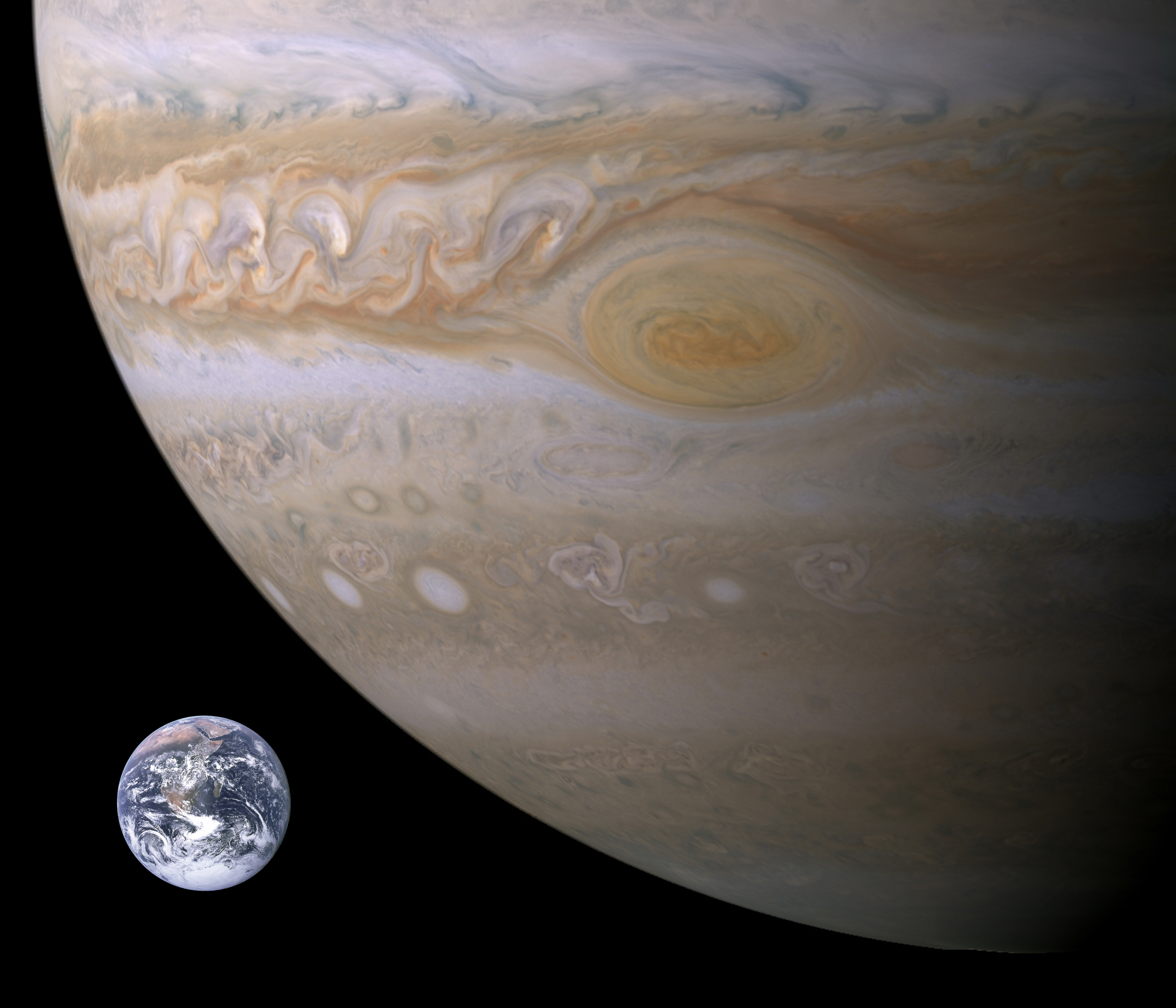
- The size of Jupiter compared to Earth

General information
- Unit system: astronomy
- Unit of: length
- Symbol: R_{J}, R_{Jup},R_{♃}

Conversions
1 R_{J} in ...	... is equal to ...
- SI base units: 7.1492×10^{7} m
- English units: 44423 miles

The Jupiter radius or Jovian radius (plural Jupiter radii or Jovian radii; denoted as R_{J} or, less commonly, R_{Jup}) has a value of 71,492 km (44,423 mi), or of 11.2 Earth radii (R_{🜨}) (one Earth radius, 6378 km, equals 0.08921 R_{J}). The Jupiter radius is a unit of length used in astronomy to describe the radii of large planets (especially gas giants) and certain exoplanets. It is also used in describing certain stars, in particular brown dwarfs.

The planet Jupiter has the approximate shape of an oblate spheroid, which is mainly set by the rate of rotation. This gives a difference of about 10% between its polar and equatorial radii.

The general shape of the planet Jupiter has been directly measured from radio occultations of passing spacecraft, starting with the Pioneer and Voyager missions. This method gave an overall margin of error of about ±5 km. Estimates of the radius at one bar pressure are then determined through extrapolation. A detailed analysis of data measured by Juno puts the current best estimates of Jupiter's equatorial radius at 71488 km and polar radius at 66842 km, corresponding to a mean radius of 69886 km, with a reported margin of error of ±0.4 km, which is slightly smaller than the nominal value defined based on earlier estimates.

Density fluctuations within the planet can create variations in the equatorial radius of up to 30 km. The winds in Jupiter's outer atmosphere can vary the radius by up to 4 km.

In 2015, the International Astronomical Union defined the nominal equatorial Jovian radius as a set number of meters, so that a commonly agreed value would remain constant, notwithstanding the subsequent improvements in measurement precision of Jupiter's radius. This 'constant' is defined as exactly:

$\mathcal{R}^\mathrm N_\mathrm {eJ}$ = 7.1492×10^{7} m

Similarly, the nominal polar Jovian radius is defined to be exactly:

$\mathcal{R}^\mathrm N_\mathrm {pJ}$ = 6.6854×10^{7} m

These values correspond to the radius of Jupiter at 1 bar of pressure. The common usage—across astronomical objects—is to refer to equatorial radius, unless the polar radius is specifically needed.

== Comparison ==
Radii of noteworthy astronomical objects relative to Jupiter
Object	R_{J} / R_{object}	Ref
Lunar radius	41	
Earth radius	11.209	
Jupiter	1	by definition
Solar radius	0.10045	

For comparison, one solar radius is approximately equal to:

- 400 Lunar radii (R_{☾})
- 109 Earth radii (R_{🜨})
- 9.955 Jupiter radii (R_{J})
