= Ton-force =

Unit of force defined as the weight of one ton

A ton-force is one of various units of force defined as the weight of one ton due to standard gravity. (Note: All calculations on this page assume the following definition of standard gravity, g_{0}. g_{0} = 9.80665 m/s^{2}) The precise definition depends on the definition of ton used.

== Tonne-force ==
The tonne-force (tf or t_{f}) (Note: The tonne-force, also known as the metric ton force, is equivalent to the megagram-force (Mgf or Mg_{f}) and the megapond (Mp).) is equal to the weight of one (metric) tonne.

one tonne-force	= 1000 kilograms-force (kgf)
one tonne-force	= 9.80665 kilonewtons (kN)
one tonne-force	≈ 2204.623 pounds-force (lbf) (Note: 1 pound / = 0.45359237 kg ∴; 1 tonne-force / = 1000/0.45359237 lbf; 1 tonne-force / ≈ 2204.62262184887 lbf)
one tonne-force	≈ 0.9842065 long tons-force (Note: 1 long ton / = 1.0160469088 t ∴; 1 tonne-force / = 1/1.0160469088 long tons-force; 1 tonne-force / ≈ 0.98420652761106 long tons-force)
one tonne-force	≈ 1.1023113 short tons-force (Note: 1 short ton / = 0.90718474 t ∴; 1 tonne-force / = 1/0.90718474 short tons-force; 1 tonne-force / ≈ 1.1023113109244 short tons-force)
one tonne-force	≈ 70931.64 poundals (pdl) (Note: 1 pdl / = 0.138254954376 N ∴; 1 tonne-force / = 9806.65/0.138254954376 pdl; 1 tonne-force / ≈ 70931.635283968 pdl)

== Long ton-force ==
The long ton-force is equal to the weight of one long ton.

one long ton-force	= 2240 lbf
one long ton-force	= 1016.0469088 kgf
one long ton-force	= 9.96401641818352 kN
one long ton-force	= 1.12 short tons-force (Note: 1 long ton-force / = 2240/2000 short tons-force; 1 long ton-force / = 1.12 short tons-force)
one long ton-force	≈ 72069.87 pdl (Note: g_{0} / = 9.80665/0.3048 ft/s^{2} ∴; 1 long ton-force / = 2240 lb × 9.80665/0.3048 ft/s^{2}; 1 long ton-force / = 27458620/381 pdl; 1 long ton-force / ≈ 72069.868766404 pdl)

== Short ton-force ==
The short ton-force is equal to the weight of one short ton.

one short ton-force	= 2000 lbf
one short ton-force	= 907.18474 kgf
one short ton-force	= 8.896443230521 kN
one short ton-force	≈ 0.892857 long tons-force (Note: 1 short ton-force / = 2000/2240 long tons-force; 1 short ton-force / = 25/28 long tons-force; 1 short ton-force / = 0.892̅8̅5̅7̅1̅4̅ long tons-force)
one short ton-force	≈ 64348.10 pdl (Note: 1 short ton-force / = 2000 lb × 9.80665/0.3048 ft/s^{2}; 1 short ton-force / = 24516625/381 pdl; 1 short ton-force / ≈ 64348.09711 pdl)
