= Poundal =

Unit of force

poundal
- Unit system: Absolute English System
- Unit of: Force
- Symbol: pdl

Conversions
1 pdl in ...	... is equal to ...
- AE base units: 1 lb⋅ft/s^{2}
- SI units: 0.1382550 N
- CGS units: 13,825.50 dyn
- British Gravitational System: 0.03108095 lbf

The poundal (symbol: pdl) is a unit of force, introduced in 1877, that is part of the Absolute English system of units, which itself is a coherent subsystem of the foot–pound–second system. The poundal is defined as the force necessary to accelerate 1 pound-mass at 1 foot per second squared.

$$1\,\text{pdl} = 1\,\text{lb}{\cdot}\text{ft}/\text{s}^2$$

1 pdl = 0.138254954376 N exactly, using the definitions for the international foot and pound.

== Background ==
English units require re-scaling of either force or mass to eliminate a numerical proportionality constant in the equation F = ma. The poundal represents one choice, which is to rescale units of force. Since 1 pound-force accelerates 1 pound-mass at 32.174 049 ft/s^{2} (9.80665 m/s^{2}; the acceleration of gravity, g), the unit of force can be scaled down such that it accelerates 1 pound-mass at 1 ft/s^{2}; this unit is called the poundal, which is approximately 1/32 pound-force.

Three approaches to units of mass and force or weight
Base	Force		Weight		Mass			
2nd law of motion	m = F/a		F = (W ⋅ a)/g		F = m ⋅ a			
System	BG	GM	EE	M	AE	CGS	MTS	SI
Acceleration (a)	ft/s^{2}	m/s^{2}	ft/s^{2}	m/s^{2}	ft/s^{2}	Gal	m/s^{2}	m/s^{2}
Mass (m)	slug	hyl	pound-mass	kilogram	pound	gram	tonne	kilogram
Force (F), weight (W)	pound	kilopond	pound-force	kilopond	poundal	dyne	sthène	newton
Pressure (p)	pound per square inch	technical atmosphere	pound-force per square inch	standard atmosphere	poundal per square foot	barye	pieze	pascal

For example, a force of 1200 poundals is required to accelerate a person of 150 pounds mass at 8 feet per second squared:
$$\mathrm{150.~lb \times 8.00~\frac{ft}{s^2} = 1200~pdl}.$$

The poundal-as-force, pound-as-mass system is contrasted with an alternative system in which the pound-force remains, instead of the pound-mass. A unit of mass is scaled such that it is accelerated by only 1 ft/s^{2} with 1 lbf; this unit is called the slug, which is about 32 lb. Using slugs and lbf, the above equation could be expressed as:
$$\mathrm{4.66~slug \times 8.00~\frac{ft}{s^2} = 37.3~lbf}.$$

Slugs (32.174049 lb) and poundals (1/32.174049 lb_{F}) tend not to be used together in the same context, as they are opposite solutions of the same problem.

Rather than changing either force or mass units, one may choose to express acceleration in units of the acceleration due to Earth's gravity (g). In this case, we can keep both pounds-mass and pounds-force, such that applying 1 pound-force to 1 pound-mass accelerates it at 1 g:
$$150~\mathrm{lb} \cdot 0.249~g = 37.3~\mathrm{lbf}.$$

Expressions derived using poundals for force and lb for mass (or lbf for force and slugs for mass) have the advantage of not being tied to conditions on the surface of the Earth. Specifically, computing F = ma on the Moon or in deep space as pdl = lb⋅ft/s^{2} or lbf = slug⋅ft/s^{2}, avoids the constant tied to acceleration of gravity on Earth.

== Conversion ==
Force units
	Newtons	Dynes	Kilograms-force kiloponds	Pounds	Poundals
1 N	≡ 1 kg⋅m/s^{2}	= 100000 dyn	≈ 0.10197 kgf	≈ 0.22481 lb	≈ 7.23301 pdl
1 dyn	= 1×10^{−5} N	≡ 1 g⋅cm/s^{2}	≈ 1.01972×10^{−6} kgf	≈ 2.24809×10^{−6} lb	≈ 7.23301×10^{−5} pdl
1 kgf	= 9.80665 N	= 980665 dyn	≡ g_{n} × 1 kg	≈ 2.20462 lb	≈ 70.9316 pdl
1 lb	≈ 4.44822 N	≈ 444822 dyn	≈ 0.45359 kgf	≡ g_{n} × 1 lb_{m} / .3048 m/ft	≈ 32.1740 pdl
1 pdl	≈ 0.13825 N	≈ 13825.5 dyn	≈ 0.01410 kgf	≈ 0.03108 lbf	≡ 1 lb_{m}⋅ft/s^{2}
