= Arthur Mason Worthington =

English physicist and educator (1852–1916)

Arthur Mason Worthington CB FRS (11 June 1852 in Manchester – 5 December 1916 in Oxford) was an English physicist and educator. He is best known for his work on fluid mechanics, especially the physics of splashes; for observing those, he pioneered techniques of high speed photography. He also proposed the slug as a unit of inertial mass, and the pound-foot as a dedicated unit of torque.

== Career ==
He was Science Master at Clifton College, Bristol (1877, 1880-1884) and then Headmaster at the Royal Naval Engineering College, Devonport.

In June 1893 he was elected a Fellow of the Royal Society. His candidacy citation read:

Head Master and Professor of Physics, Royal Naval Engineering College, Devonport. Distinguished as a physicist, especially for his researches on surface tension and on the stretching of liquids.

Splash of a drop of water into milk mixed with water after the photographs of Worthington

Author of the following papers: - 'On the Forms assumed by Drops of Liquid falling Vertically on a Horizontal Plate' (Proc Roy Soc, 1876-1877); 'On the Spontaneous Segmentation of a Liquid Annulus' (ibid, 1879); 'On Pendent Drops' (ibid, 1881); 'On Impact with a Liquid Surface' (ibid, 1882);

Splash of a drop of mercury on glass.

'On the Horizontal Motion of Floating Bodies under the Action of Capillary Forces' (Phil Mag, 1883); On the Surface Forces in Fluids' (ibid, 1884); 'On the Error involved in Prof Quincke's Method of Calculating Surface Tensions from the Dimensions of Flat Drops and Bubbles' (ibid, 1885); 'A Capillary Multiplier' (ibid); 'On Tensional Stress and Strain within a Liquid' (Brit Assoc, Sect A, 1888); 'On the Discharge of Electrification by Flames' (Brit Assoc, Rept Electrolysis Comm, 1889); 'on the Mechanical Stretching of Liquids, an Experimental Determination of the Volume-Extensibility of Ethyl Alcohol' (read before the Roy Soc, Feb 4, 1892). Also of the following: - 'Physical Laboratory Practice,' and 'The Dynamics of Rotation.

Worthington was appointed a Companion of the Order of the Bath (CB) in the 1902 Coronation Honours list published on 26 June 1902, and received the insignia from King Edward VII in an investiture on board the royal yacht Victoria and Albert outside Cowes on 15 August 1902, the day before the fleet review held there to mark the coronation.

== Personal life ==
Worthington was educated at Rugby School, which he left in 1871, before attending Trinity College, Oxford, where he earned a Bachelor of Arts (B.A.) in 1875 and a Master of Arts (M.A.) in 1878.

He married Helen Solly, the younger daughter of Thomas Solly. Arthur Worthington's recreations were sketching and tennis.

== Bibliography ==
- A. M. Worthington (1895). The Splash of a Drop. Society for Promoting Christian Knowledge.
- A. M. Worthington (1908). A Study of Splashes. Longmans, Green, and Co.
