= Coherence (units of measurement) =

Type of system of units of measurement

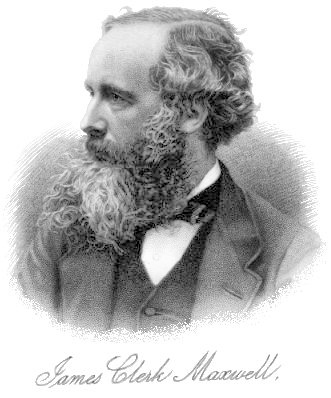
James Clerk Maxwell played a major role in developing the concept of a coherent CGS system and in extending the metric system to include electrical units.

A coherent system of units is a system of units of measurement used to express physical quantities, (Note: In this subject, quantity means the kind of property being measured (such as length), not the amount of it.) that does not use conversion factors in the definitions of its derived units.

A coherent derived unit is a derived unit that, for a given system of quantities and a chosen set of base units, is a product of powers (Note: A derived quantity Q = L^{a}⋅M^{b}⋅T^{c}⋅I^{d}⋅Θ^{e}⋅N^{f}⋅J^{g}, where "L" = the base quantity called length, etc. (These uppercase letters officially represent the dimensions rather than the quantities.) The powers (exponents) are usually small integers; a negative power denotes division; a power of "0" effectively sets its base quantity to "1", meaning it is irrelevant. The same equation, with the same exponent values, applies to the coherent derived unit, thus "L" can be replaced by "m" = the base unit called metre, etc.) of base units, with the proportionality factor being one.

This means that any equation relating numerical values (expressed in the units of the system) has the same form, including the same numerical factors, as the corresponding equation relating the relevant quantities. (Note: The relevant terms are related by this expression: value = {numerical value} × [measurement unit], e.g. 5 kg = {5} × [kg].) E.g. for kinetic energy, the quantity equation is E = (1/2) × m × v^{2}. If m = 2 kg and v = 3 m/s, then the numerical value equation is 9 J = (1/2) × 2 kg × (3 m/s)^{2}.

The concept of coherence was developed in the mid-nineteenth century by, among others, Lord Kelvin and James Clerk Maxwell, and promoted by the British Association for the Advancement of Science. The concept was initially applied to the systems of units called centimetre–gram–second (CGS) in 1873 and foot–pound–second (FPS) in 1875. The International System of Units (SI) was designed in 1960 to incorporate the principle of coherence.

== Examples ==
In the SI, the derived unit m/s is a coherent derived unit for speed or velocity, but km/h is not. Speed or velocity is defined by a change in distance divided by the corresponding change in time. The derived unit m/s uses only the base units of the SI system. The derived unit km/h requires numerical factors to relate to the SI base units: e.g. 18 km/h × (1000 m/km) / (3600 s/h) = 5 m/s. The unit equation is thus 1 km/h = (1/3.6) m/s. (Note: The hour is an off-system unit.)

In the CGS system, m/s is not a coherent derived unit: the numerical factor of 100 cm/m is needed to express m/s in the CGS system.

== History ==
=== Before the metric system ===
The earliest units of measure devised by humanity bore no relationship to each other. As both humanity's understanding of philosophical concepts and the organisation of society developed, so units of measurement were standardised. First, particular units of measure had the same value across a community, then different units of the same quantity (for example, feet and inches) were given a fixed relationship. Apart from Ancient China, where the units of capacity (volume) and of mass were linked to red millet seed, there is little evidence of the linking of different quantities until the Enlightenment.

=== Relating quantities of the same kind ===
The history of the measurement of length dates back to the early civilisation of the Middle East (10000 BC – 8000 BC). Archaeologists have been able to reconstruct the units of measure in use in Mesopotamia, India, Ancient Israel and many others. Archaeological and other evidence shows that, in many civilisations, the ratios between different units for the same quantity of measure were adjusted so that they were integer numbers. In many early cultures, such as Ancient Egypt, multiples with prime factors aside from 2, 3 and 5 were sometimes used – the Egyptian royal cubit being 28 fingers or 7 palms. In 2150 BC, the Akkadian emperor Naram-Sin rationalised the Babylonian system of measure, adjusting the ratios of many units to have prime factors of only 2, 3 and 5; for example, there were 6 she (barleycorns or grains) (Note: This barleycorn is about 2.8 mm, but is the width of the grain, not the length. An English barleycorn is 1/3 inch (8.5 mm).) in a shu-si (finger), and 30 shu-si in a kush (cubit).

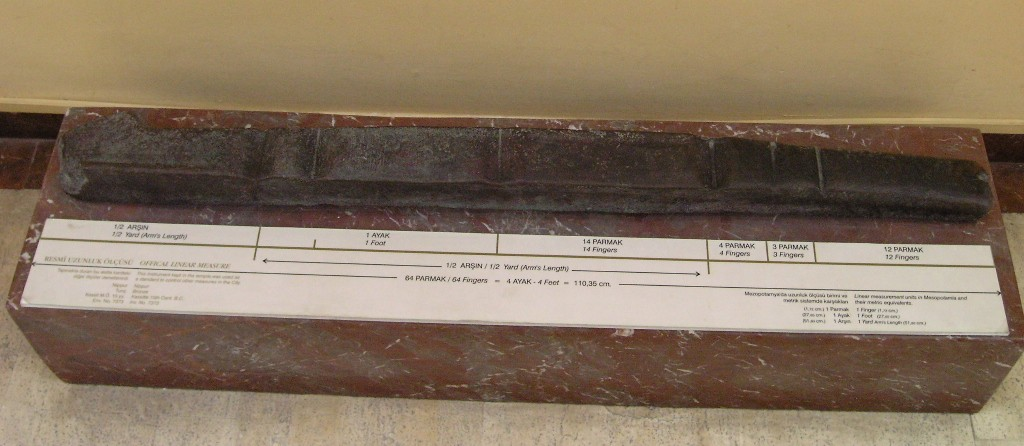
Oldest preserved measuring rod, dating to 2650 BC, excavated at Nippur, Mesopotamia, on display in the Archaeology Museum of Istanbul, Turkey. The rod shows the various units of measure in use.

=== Relating quantities of different kinds ===
Non-commensurable quantities have different physical dimensions, which means that adding or subtracting them is not meaningful. For instance, adding the mass of an object to its volume has no physical meaning. However, the units of new quantities can be derived via multiplication and exponentiation of the units of other quantities. As an example, the SI unit for force is the newton, which is defined as kg⋅m⋅s^{−2}. (Note: In 2013 the Consultative Committee for Units decided to return to the original order of SI base unit symbols, in which, for instance, newton was written kg⋅m⋅s^{−2} (instead of m⋅kg⋅s^{−2}), to reflect the underlying physics.) Since a coherent derived unit is one which is defined by means of multiplication and exponentiation of base units with no scaling factor, the pascal is a coherent SI unit of pressure (defined as kg⋅m^{−1}⋅s^{−2}), but the bar (defined as 100000 kg⋅m^{−1}⋅s^{−2}) is not.

Two quantities with the same units cannot be added together unless they are of the same kind. For example, energy cannot be added to torque (moment of force), despite joules and newton-metres being dimensionally equivalent (kg⋅m^{2}⋅s^{−2}). (Note: Energy [J] = torque [N⋅m] × angle [rad], but radians are considered dimensionless.)

Coherence of a given unit depends on the definition of the base units. If the SI base unit of length were reduced by a factor of 100000, the bar would then be a coherent SI derived unit, of unchanged size. However, a coherent unit remains coherent (and a non-coherent unit remains non-coherent) if any base units are redefined in terms of other units, with each numerical factor being unity. (Note: If the SI base unit called ampere were replaced by the farad (currently F = kg^{−1}⋅m^{−2}⋅s^{4}⋅A^{2}), the ampere would be redefined as A = kg^{0.5}⋅m⋅s^{−2}⋅F^{0.5} (the exponents need not be integers). All units would remain the same size, there would be no definition factors, and coherence would be maintained.)

=== Metric system ===
The concept of coherence was introduced into the metric system only in the third quarter of the nineteenth century. In its original form in 1795, the metric system was non-coherent – in particular, the litre was 0.001 m^{3} and the are (from which is derived the hectare) was 100 m^{2}. However, a precursor to coherence occurred by designating the gram as the mass of one cubic centimetre of water at its freezing point.

The CGS system had two units of energy, the erg that was related to mechanics, and the calorie that was related to thermal energy, so only one of them (the erg, equivalent to the g⋅cm^{2}⋅s^{−2}) could bear a coherent relationship to the base units. By contrast, coherence was a design aim of the SI, resulting in only one unit of energy being defined – the joule.

The base and coherent derived units of the SI form a coherent set, called the coherent SI units. Each quantity has only one coherent SI unit, even if expressible in different forms via the special names and symbols, such as the quantity called power having equivalent units of watts, joules per second, and kg⋅m^{2}⋅s^{−3}. However, some SI units can express the values of several quantities, such as with energy and torque. SI units used with a prefix, to give decimal multiples and submultiples, are not coherent, except for the kilogram, whereby the gram is non-coherent.

== Some named coherent derived units ==
Quantity	Unit name	Definition
Some of the 22 SI system units
Main article: SI derived unit
frequency	hertz	reciprocal of time (inverse second)
force	newton	mass (kilogram) × acceleration (m/s^{2})
pressure	pascal	force (newton) ÷ area (square metre)
energy	joule	force (newton) × distance (metre)
power	watt	energy (joule) ÷ time (second)
electric charge	coulomb	electric current (ampere) × time (second)
potential difference	volt	power (watt) ÷ electric current (ampere)
capacitance	farad	electric charge (coulomb) ÷ potential difference (volt)
electrical resistance	ohm	potential difference (volt) ÷ electric current (ampere)
electrical conductance	siemens	electric current (ampere) ÷ potential difference (volt)
magnetic flux	weber	potential difference (volt) × time (second)
magnetic flux density	tesla	magnetic flux (weber) ÷ area (square metre)
radioactive activity	becquerel	reciprocal of time (inverse second)
absorbed radiation dose	gray	energy (joule) ÷ mass (kilogram)
equivalent radiation dose	sievert	energy (joule) ÷ mass (kilogram)
The other seven are: radian, steradian, henry, degree Celsius, lumen, lux, katal.
CGS mechanical units
acceleration	gal	distance (centimetre) ÷ time squared (s^{2})
force	dyne	mass (gram) × acceleration (cm/s^{2})
pressure	barye	force (dyne) ÷ area (square centimetre)
energy	erg	force (dyne) × distance (centimetre)
dynamic viscosity	poise	mass (gram) ÷ (distance (centimetre) × time (second))
kinematic viscosity	stokes	area (square centimetre) ÷ time (second)
FPS mechanical units
force	poundal	mass (pound) × acceleration (ft/s^{2})

== See also ==
- Systems of measurement
- Geometrized unit system
- Planck units
- Atomic units
- Metre–kilogram–second system (MKS)
- Metre–tonne–second system (MTS)
- Quadrant–eleventhgram–second system (QES)
