= Slug (unit) =

Unit of mass

slug
- Unit system: British Gravitational system
- Unit of: Mass
- Symbol: slug

Conversions
1 slug in ...	... is equal to ...
- BGS base units: 1 lbf s^{2} ft^{−1}
- SI units: 14.59390 kg
- US customary units: 32.17404 lb

The slug is a derived unit of mass in a weight-based system of measures, most notably within the British Imperial measurement system and the United States customary measures system. Systems of measure either define mass and derive a force unit or define a base force and derive a mass unit (cf. poundal, a derived unit of force in a mass-based system). A slug is defined as a mass that is accelerated by 1 ft/s^{2} when a net force of one pound (lbf) is exerted on it.

$$1~\text{slug}= 1~\text{lbf}{\cdot}\frac{\text{s}^2}{\text{ft}}
\quad\Longleftrightarrow\quad
1~\text{lbf}= 1~\text{slug}{\cdot}\frac{\text{ft}}{\text{s}^2}$$

One slug is a mass equal to 32.17405 lb (14.59390 kg) based on standard gravity, the international foot, and the avoirdupois pound. In other words, at the Earth's surface (in standard gravity), an object with a mass of 1 slug weighs approximately 32.17405 lbf or 143.1173 N.

== History ==
The slug is part of a subset of units known as the gravitational FPS system, one of several such specialized systems of mechanical units developed in the late 19th and the early 20th century. Geepound was another name for this unit in early literature.

The name "slug" was coined before 1900 by British physicist Arthur Mason Worthington, but it did not see any significant use until decades later. It is derived from the meaning "solid block of metal" (cf. "slug" fake coin or "slug" projectile), not from the slug mollusc. A 1928 textbook says:

No name has yet been given to the unit of mass and, in fact, as we have developed the theory of dynamics no name is necessary. Whenever the mass, m, appears in our formulae, we substitute the ratio of the convenient force-acceleration pair (w/g), and measure the mass in lbs. per ft./sec.^{2} or in grams per cm./sec.^{2}.

— Noel Charlton Little, College Physics, Charles Scribner's Sons, 1928, p. 165.

Three approaches to units of mass and force or weight
Base	Force		Weight		Mass			
2nd law of motion	m = F/a		F = (W ⋅ a)/g		F = m ⋅ a			
System	BG	GM	EE	M	AE	CGS	MTS	SI
Acceleration (a)	ft/s^{2}	m/s^{2}	ft/s^{2}	m/s^{2}	ft/s^{2}	Gal	m/s^{2}	m/s^{2}
Mass (m)	slug	hyl	pound-mass	kilogram	pound	gram	tonne	kilogram
Force (F), weight (W)	pound	kilopond	pound-force	kilopond	poundal	dyne	sthène	newton
Pressure (p)	pound per square inch	technical atmosphere	pound-force per square inch	standard atmosphere	poundal per square foot	barye	pieze	pascal

The slug is listed in the Regulations under the Weights and Measures (National Standards) Act, 1960. This regulation defines the units of weights and measures, both regular and metric, in Australia.

== Related units ==
The inch version of the slug (equal to 1 lbf⋅s^{2}/in, or 12 slugs) has no official name, but is commonly referred to as a blob, slinch (a portmanteau of the words slug and inch), slugette, or snail. It is equivalent to 386.0886 pounds (175.1268 kg) based on standard gravity.

Similar (but long-obsolete) metric units included the glug (980.665 g) in a gravitational system related to the centimetre–gram–second system, and the mug, hyl, par, or TME (German: technische Masseneinheit, lit. 'technical mass unit', 9.80665 kg) in a gravitational system related to the metre–kilogram–second system.

== See also ==
- British Engineering Units
