= Pound (force) =

Unit of force

Pound-force
- Unit system: English Engineering units, British Gravitational System
- Symbol: lbf

Conversions
1 lbf in ...	... is equal to ...
- SI units: 4.448222 N
- CGS units: 444,822.2 dyn
- Absolute English System: 32.17405 pdl

The pound of force or pound-force (symbol: lbf, sometimes lb_{f},) is a unit of force used in some systems of measurement, including English Engineering units (Note: Despite its name, this system is based on United States customary units and is only used in the US.) and the foot–pound–second system.

Pound-force should not be confused with pound-mass (lb), often simply called "pound", which is a unit of mass; nor should these be confused with foot-pound (ft⋅lbf), a unit of energy, or pound-foot (lbf⋅ft), a unit of torque.

== Definitions ==
The pound-force is equal to the gravitational force exerted on a mass of one avoirdupois pound on the surface of Earth. Since the 18th century, the unit has been used in low-precision measurements, for which small changes in Earth's gravity (which varies from equator to pole by up to half a percent) can safely be neglected.

The 20th century, however, brought the need for a more precise definition, requiring a standardized value for acceleration due to gravity.

=== Product of avoirdupois pound and standard gravity ===
The pound-force is the product of one avoirdupois pound (exactly 0.45359237 kg) and the standard acceleration due to gravity, approximately 32.174049 ft/s^{2} (9.80665 m/s^{2}).

The standard values of acceleration of the standard gravitational field (g_{n}) and the international avoirdupois pound (lb) result in a pound-force equal to 32.174049 lb⋅ft/s^{2} (4.4482216152605 N). (Note: The international avoirdupois pound is defined to be exactly 0.45359237 kg.)
$$\begin{align}
1\,\text{lbf} &= 1\,\text{lb} \times g_\text{n} \\
&= 1\,\text{lb} \times 9.806\,65\,\tfrac{\text{m}}{\text{s}^2} / 0.3048\,\tfrac{\text{m}}{\text{ft}}\\
&\approx 1\,\text{lb} \times 32.174\,049\,\mathrm{\tfrac{ft}{s^2}}\\
&\approx 32.174\,049\,\mathrm{\tfrac{lb {\cdot} ft}{s^2}} \\
1\,\text{lbf} &= 1\,\text{lb} \times 0.453\,592\,37\,\tfrac{\text{kg}}{\text{lb}} \times g_\text{n} \\
&= 0.453\,592\,37\,\text{kg} \times 9.806\,65\,\tfrac{\text{m}}{\text{s}^2}\\
&= 4.448\,221\,615\,2605\,\text{N}.
\end{align}$$

This definition can be rephrased in terms of the slug. A slug has a mass of 32.174049 lb. A pound-force is the amount of force required to accelerate a slug at a rate of 1 ft/s^{2}, so:
$$\begin{align}
1\,\text{lbf} &= 1\,\text{slug} \times 1\,\tfrac{\text{ft}}{\text{s}^2} \\
&= 1\,\tfrac{\text{slug} \cdot \text{ft}}{\text{s}^2}.
\end{align}$$

== Conversion to other units ==
Force units
	Newtons	Dynes	Kilograms-force kiloponds	Pounds	Poundals
1 N	≡ 1 kg⋅m/s^{2}	= 100000 dyn	≈ 0.10197 kgf	≈ 0.22481 lb	≈ 7.23301 pdl
1 dyn	= 1×10^{−5} N	≡ 1 g⋅cm/s^{2}	≈ 1.01972×10^{−6} kgf	≈ 2.24809×10^{−6} lb	≈ 7.23301×10^{−5} pdl
1 kgf	= 9.80665 N	= 980665 dyn	≡ g_{n} × 1 kg	≈ 2.20462 lb	≈ 70.9316 pdl
1 lb	≈ 4.44822 N	≈ 444822 dyn	≈ 0.45359 kgf	≡ g_{n} × 1 lb_{m} / .3048 m/ft	≈ 32.1740 pdl
1 pdl	≈ 0.13825 N	≈ 13825.5 dyn	≈ 0.01410 kgf	≈ 0.03108 lbf	≡ 1 lb_{m}⋅ft/s^{2}

== Foot–pound–second (FPS) systems of units ==
In some contexts, the term "pound" is used almost exclusively to refer to the unit of force and not the unit of mass. In those applications, the preferred unit of mass is the slug, i.e. lbf⋅s^{2}/ft. In other contexts, the unit "pound" refers to a unit of mass. The international standard symbol for the pound as a unit of mass is lb.

Three approaches to units of mass and force or weight
Base	Force		Weight		Mass			
2nd law of motion	m = F/a		F = (W ⋅ a)/g		F = m ⋅ a			
System	BG	GM	EE	M	AE	CGS	MTS	SI
Acceleration (a)	ft/s^{2}	m/s^{2}	ft/s^{2}	m/s^{2}	ft/s^{2}	Gal	m/s^{2}	m/s^{2}
Mass (m)	slug	hyl	pound-mass	kilogram	pound	gram	tonne	kilogram
Force (F), weight (W)	pound	kilopond	pound-force	kilopond	poundal	dyne	sthène	newton
Pressure (p)	pound per square inch	technical atmosphere	pound-force per square inch	standard atmosphere	poundal per square foot	barye	pieze	pascal

In the "engineering" systems (middle column), the weight of the mass unit (pound-mass) on Earth's surface is approximately equal to the force unit (pound-force). This is convenient because one pound mass exerts one pound force due to gravity. Note, however, unlike the other systems the force unit is not equal to the mass unit multiplied by the acceleration unit—the use of Newton's second law, F = m ⋅ a, requires another factor, g_{c}, usually taken to be 32.174049 (lb⋅ft)/(lbf⋅s^{2}). "Absolute" systems are coherent systems of units: by using the slug as the unit of mass, the "gravitational" FPS system (left column) avoids the need for such a constant. The SI is an "absolute" metric system with kilogram and meter as base units.

== Pound of thrust ==
The term pound of thrust is an alternative name for pound-force in specific contexts. It is frequently seen in US sources on jet engines and rocketry, some of which continue to use the FPS notation. For example, the thrust produced by each of the Space Shuttle's two Solid Rocket Boosters was 3,300,000 pounds-force (14.7 MN), together 6,600,000 pounds-force (29.4 MN).

== See also ==
- Foot-pound – Unit of energy
- Kip (unit) – US customary unit of force (1000 pounds-force)
- Mass in general relativity – Facet of general relativity
- Mass in special relativity – Meanings of mass in special relativity
- Mass versus weight for the difference between the two physical properties
- Newton – Unit of force in physics
- Poundal – Unit of force
- Pounds per square inch – Unit of pressure or stress
- Ton-force – Unit of force defined as the weight of one ton

== General sources ==
- Obert, Edward F. (1948). Thermodynamics. New York: D. J. Leggett Book Company. Chapter I "Survey of Dimensions and Units", pp. 1-24.
