= Gravitational metric system =

System with base units kilopond, metre and second

The gravitational metric system (original French term Système des Méchaniciens) is a non-standard system of units, which does not comply with the International System of Units (SI). It is built on the three base quantities length, time and force with base units metre, second and kilopond respectively. Internationally used abbreviations of the system are MKpS, MKfS or MKS (from French mètre–kilogramme-poids–seconde or mètre–kilogramme-force–seconde). However, the abbreviation MKS is also used for the MKS system of units, which, like the SI, uses mass in kilogram as a base unit.

== Disadvantages ==
Nowadays, the mass as a property of an object and its weight, which depends on the gravity of the Earth at its position are strictly distinguished. However historically, the kilopond was also called kilogram, and only later the kilogram-mass (today's kilogram) was separated from the kilogram-force (today's kilopond). A kilopond originally referred to the weight of a mass of one kilogram. Since the gravitational acceleration on the surface of the Earth can differ, one gets different values for the unit kilopond and its derived units at different locations. To avoid this, the kilopond was first defined at sea level and a latitude of 45 degrees, since 1902 via the standard gravity of 9.80665 m/s^{2}.

Further disadvantages are inconsistencies in the definition of derived units such as horsepower (1 PS = 75 kp⋅m/s) and the missing link to electric, magnetic or thermodynamic units.

In Germany, the kilopond lost its legal status as a unit of force on 1 January 1978, when for legal purposes the SI unit system was adopted. A kilopond can be converted to the SI unit newton by multiplication with the standard acceleration g_{n}:

1 kp = g_{n} ⋅ 1 kg = 9.80665 kg⋅m⋅s^{−2} = 9.80665 N

== Units ==
=== Force ===
In English contexts the unit of force is usually formed by simply appending the suffix "force" to the name of the unit of mass, thus gram-force (gf) or kilogram-force (kgf), which follows the tradition of pound-force (lbf). In other, international, contexts the special name pond (p) or kilopond (kp) respectively is more frequent.

1 p = 1 gf
= 1 g ⋅ g_{n} = 9.80665 g⋅m/s^{2} = 980.665 g⋅cm/s^{2} = 980.665 dyn
1 kp = 1 kgf
= 1 kg ⋅ g_{n} = 9.80665 kg⋅m/s^{2} = 980665 g⋅cm/s^{2}

=== Mass ===
The hyl, metric slug (mug), or TME (German: technische Masseneinheit, lit. 'technical mass unit'), is the mass that accelerates at 1 m/s^{2} under a force of 1 kgf. The unit, long obsolete, has also been used as the unit of mass in a metre–gram-force–second (mgfs) system.

1 TME
= 1 kp / 1 m/s^{2} = 1 kp⋅s^{2}/m = 9.80665 kg
1 hyl
= 1 kp⋅s^{2}/m = 9.80665 kg or
1 hyl (alternate definition – mgfs)
= 1 p⋅s^{2}/m = 9.80665 g

=== Pressure ===
The gravitational unit of pressure is the technical atmosphere (at). It is the gravitational force of one kilogram, i.e. 1 kgf, exerted on an area of one square centimetre.

1 at
= 1 kp/cm^{2} = 10 000 × g_{n} kg/m^{2} = 98 066.5 kg/(m⋅s^{2}) = 98.066 5 kPa

=== Energy ===
There is no dedicated name for the unit of energy, "metre" is simply appended to "kilopond", but usually the symbol of the kilopond-metre is written without the middle dot.

1 kpm
= 1 kp⋅m = g_{n} kg⋅m = 9.806 65 kg⋅m^{2}/s^{2} = 9.806 65 J

=== Power ===
In 19th-century France there was as a unit of power, the poncelet, which was defined as the power required to raise a mass of 1 quintal (1 q = 100 kg) at a velocity of 1 m/s. The German or metric horsepower (PS, Pferdestärke) is arbitrarily selected to be three quarters thereof.

1 p_{q}
= 1 q_{f}⋅m/s = 100 kp⋅m/s = 100 × g_{n} kg⋅m/s = 980.665 kg⋅m^{2}/s^{3} = 0.980 665 kW
1 PS
= 3/4 p_{q} = 75 kp⋅m/s = 75 × g_{n} kg⋅m/s = 735.498 75 kg⋅m^{2}/s^{3} = 0.735 498 75 kW

== See also ==
- List of metric units
