= Kilogram-force =

Weight on earth of a one-kilogram mass

kilogram-force
- Unit system: Gravitational metric system
- Unit of: Force
- Symbol: kgf

Conversions
1 kgf in ...	... is equal to ...
- SI units: 9.806650 N
- CGS units: 980,665.0 dyn
- British Gravitational units: 2.204623 lbf
- Absolute English units: 70.93164 pdl

The kilogram-force (kgf or kg_{F}), or kilopond (kp, from Latin: pondus, lit. 'weight'), is a non-standard gravitational metric unit of force. It is not accepted for use with the International System of Units (SI) and is deprecated for most uses, superseded by the newton. The kilogram-force is equal to the magnitude of the force exerted on one kilogram of mass in a 9.80665 m/s^{2} gravitational field (standard gravity, a conventional value approximating the average magnitude of gravity on Earth). That is, it is the weight of a kilogram under standard gravity. One kilogram-force is defined as 9.80665 N. Similarly, a gram-force is 9.80665 mN, and a milligram-force is 9.80665 μN.

== History ==
The gram-force and kilogram-force were never well-defined units until the CGPM adopted a standard acceleration of gravity of 9.80665 m/s^{2} for this purpose in 1901, though they had been used in low-precision measurements of force before that time. Even then, the proposal to define kilogram-force as a standard unit of force was explicitly rejected. Instead, the newton was proposed in 1913 and accepted in 1948. The kilogram-force has never been a part of the International System of Units (SI), which was introduced in 1960. The SI unit of force is the newton.

Prior to this, the units were widely used in much of the world. They are still in use for some purposes; for example, they are used to specify tension of bicycle spokes, draw weight of bows in archery, and tensile strength of electronics bond wire, for informal references to pressure (as the technically incorrect kilogram per square centimetre, omitting -force, the kilogram-force per square centimetre being the technical atmosphere, the value of which is very near those of both the bar and the standard atmosphere), and to define the "metric horsepower" (PS) as 75 metre-kiloponds per second. In addition, the kilogram force was the standard unit used for Vickers hardness testing.

Three approaches to metric units of mass and force or weight
Base	Force	Weight	Mass		
2nd law of motion	m = F/a	F = (W ⋅ a)/g	F = m ⋅ a		
System	GM	M	CGS	MTS	SI
Acceleration (a)	m/s^{2}	m/s^{2}	Gal	m/s^{2}	m/s^{2}
Mass (m)	hyl	kilogram	gram	tonne	kilogram
Force (F), weight (W)	kilopond	kilopond	dyne	sthène	newton
Pressure (p)	technical atmosphere	standard atmosphere	barye	pieze	pascal

In 1940s, Germany, the thrust of a rocket engine was measured in kilograms-force, in the Soviet Union it remained the primary unit for thrust in the Russian space program until at least the late 1980s. Dividing the thrust in kilograms-force on the mass of an engine or a rocket in kilograms conveniently gives the thrust to weight ratio, dividing the thrust on propellant consumption rate (mass flow rate) in kilograms per second gives the specific impulse in seconds.

The term "kilopond" has been declared obsolete.

== Related units ==
The tonne-force, metric ton-force, megagram-force, and megapond (Mp) are each 1000 kilograms-force.

The decanewton or dekanewton (daN), exactly 10 N, is used in some fields as an approximation to the kilogram-force, because it is close to the 9.80665 N of 1 kgf.

The gram-force is 1/1000 of a kilogram-force.

Force units
	Newtons	Dynes	Kilograms-force kiloponds	Pounds	Poundals
1 N	≡ 1 kg⋅m/s^{2}	= 100000 dyn	≈ 0.10197 kgf	≈ 0.22481 lb	≈ 7.23301 pdl
1 dyn	= 1×10^{−5} N	≡ 1 g⋅cm/s^{2}	≈ 1.01972×10^{−6} kgf	≈ 2.24809×10^{−6} lb	≈ 7.23301×10^{−5} pdl
1 kgf	= 9.80665 N	= 980665 dyn	≡ g_{n} × 1 kg	≈ 2.20462 lb	≈ 70.9316 pdl
1 lb	≈ 4.44822 N	≈ 444822 dyn	≈ 0.45359 kgf	≡ g_{n} × 1 lb_{m} / .3048 m/ft	≈ 32.1740 pdl
1 pdl	≈ 0.13825 N	≈ 13825.5 dyn	≈ 0.01410 kgf	≈ 0.03108 lbf	≡ 1 lb_{m}⋅ft/s^{2}

== See also ==
- Metrology
- Avoirdupois
