= International yard and pound =

Units defined by international agreement

The international yard and pound are two units of measurement that were the subject of an agreement among representatives of six nations signed on 1 July 1959: Australia, Canada, New Zealand, South Africa, the United Kingdom and the United States. The agreement defined the yard as exactly 0.9144 meters and the avoirdupois pound as exactly 0.45359237 kilograms.

== History ==
In October 1834, the British Houses of Parliament were destroyed in a fire. Among the items lost were the objects that defined the imperial standards of length and mass. New prototypes were subsequently created to replace the items lost in the fire, among them a new "yardstick" ruler in 1855, and with it a new formal definition of the yard. Two copies of the ruler were subsequently presented to the United States, which in turn adopted the measure for the United States national standard yard.

In 1866, the U.S. Congress passed a law that allowed, but did not require, the use of the metric system in trade and commerce. Included in the law was a table of conversion factors between the US customary (i.e. English-derived) and metric units, among them a definition of the meter in terms of the yard, and the kilogram in terms of the pound. In 1893, the Mendenhall Order changed the fundamental standards of length and mass of the United States from the customary standards based on those of England to metric standards. There were two factors that influenced the order: for one, the imperial standard yard of 1855 had been found to be unstable and shortening by measurable amounts. Secondly, the United States was a co-signee of the Treaty of the Metre of 1875 and had received two meter prototypes on which to base a new fundamental standard.

In the United Kingdom, a similar situation developed with the Weights and Measures Act 1897 legalizing the metric system, and Order in Council 411 (1898) defining the meter and kilogram in terms of the yard and pound. As a practical matter the British definitions were reversed, resulting in a de facto definition of the imperial yard as 36/39.370113 meter.

In the 1890s, Albert Michelson began conducting experiments in interferometry that led in 1903 to demonstrating the feasibility of using light waves as units of linear measurement. In 1908, two teams of researchers, one led by Michelson, defined the length of the international prototype meter in terms of light waves. In 1927, the International Bureau of Weights and Measures provisionally adopted the 1908 light-wave definition of the meter as a supplemental standard.

In 1930, the British Standards Institution adopted an inch of exactly 25.4 millimetres (mm), based on the 1927 light-wave definition of the meter. The American Standards Association followed suit in 1933. By 1935, industry in 16 countries had adopted the "industrial inch" as it came to be known. In 1946, the British Commonwealth Scientific Conference recommended that members of the British Commonwealth adopt the inch as exactly 25.4 mm, and the 36-inch yard as exactly 0.9144 meters. The British Commonwealth Scientific Conference's recommendations were accepted by the Canadian Standards Association in 1951.

In October 1958, the International Committee on Weights and Measures made a recommendation that the meter be defined in atomic terms (specifically in terms of the orange line of krypton-86). To secure identical values for the yard and pound in precise measurements, representatives of six English-speaking nations—Australia, Canada, New Zealand, South Africa, United States and United Kingdom—agreed to adopt a common 'international yard and international pound'. According to that agreement, the international yard equals 0.9144 meters and the international pound equals 0.45359237 kilograms. The international yard was about two millionths of a meter longer than the imperial yard, while the international pound was about six ten-millionths of a kilogram lighter than the imperial pound.

The metric-based international yard and international pound were adopted by the United States National Bureau of Standards effective 1 July 1959. In Australia, the international yard and pound were instituted through Statutory Rule No. 142 of 1961, effective 1 January 1964. The UK adopted the same definitions for all purposes through the Weights and Measures Act 1963, effective 1 January 1964.

== See also ==
- Imperial units
- International System of Units
- United States customary units
