= Foot–pound–second system of units =

Physical system of measurement that uses the foot, pound, and second as base units

The foot–pound–second system (FPS system) is a system of units built on three fundamental units: the foot for length, the (avoirdupois) pound for either mass or force (see below), and the second for time.

== Variants ==
Collectively, the variants of the FPS system were the most common system in technical publications in English until the middle of the 20th century.

Errors can be avoided and translation between the systems facilitated by labelling all physical quantities consistently with their units. Especially in the context of the FPS system this is sometimes known as the Stroud system after William Stroud, who popularized it.

Three approaches to English units of mass and force or weight
Base	Force	Weight	Mass
2nd law of motion	m = F/a	F = (W ⋅ a)/g	F = m ⋅ a
System	British Gravitational (BG)	English Engineering (EE)	Absolute English (AE)
Acceleration (a)	ft/s^{2}	ft/s^{2}	ft/s^{2}
Mass (m)	slug	pound-mass	pound
Force (F), weight (W)	pound	pound-force	poundal
Pressure (p)	pound per square inch	pound-force per square inch	poundal per square foot

=== Pound as mass unit ===
When the pound is used as a unit of mass, the core of the coherent system is similar and functionally equivalent to the corresponding subsets of the International System of Units (SI), using metre, kilogram and second (MKS), and the earlier centimetre–gram–second system of units (CGS). This system is sometimes called the Absolute English System.

In this sub-system, the unit of force is a derived unit known as the poundal.

$$\mathrm{1\,pdl} = \mathrm{1\,lb{\cdot}ft/s^2}.$$

The international standard symbol for the pound as unit of mass rather than force is lb.

In 1861, Joseph David Everett proposed the metric dyne and erg as the units of force and energy in the FPS system.

Latimer Clark's 1891 Dictionary of Metric and Other Useful Measures contains celo (acceleration), vel or velo (velocity) and pulse (momentum) as proposed names for FPS absolute units.

=== Pound as force unit ===
The technical or gravitational FPS system or British gravitational system is a coherent variant of the FPS system that is most common among engineers in the United States. It takes the pound-force as a fundamental unit of force instead of the pound as a fundamental unit of mass.

In this sub-system, the unit of mass is a derived unit known as the slug.

$$\mathrm{1\,slug} = \mathrm{1\,lbf{\cdot}s^2/ft}.$$

In the context of the gravitational FPS system, the pound-force (lbf) is sometimes referred to as the pound (lb).

=== Pound-force as force unit and pound-mass as mass unit ===
Another variant of the FPS system uses both the pound-mass and the pound-force, but neither the slug nor the poundal. The resulting system is sometimes also known as the English engineering system. Despite its name, the system is based on United States customary units of measure; it is not used in England.

== Other units ==
=== Molar units ===
The unit of substance in the FPS system is the pound-mole (lb-mol) = 273.16×10^{24}. Until the SI decided to adopt the gram-mole, the mole was directly derived from the mass unit as (mass unit)/(atomic mass unit). The unit (lbf⋅s^{2}/ft)-mol also appears in a former definition of the atmosphere.

=== Electromagnetic units ===
The electrostatic and electromagnetic systems are derived from units of length and force, mainly. As such, these are ready extensions of any system of containing length, mass, time. Stephen Dresner gives the derived electrostatic and electromagnetic units in both the foot–pound–second and foot–slug–second systems. In practice, these are most associated with the centimetre–gram–second system. The 1929 "International Critical Tables" gives in the symbols and systems fpse = FPS electrostatic system and fpsm = FPS electromagnetic system. Under the conversions for charge, the following are given. The CRC Handbook of Chemistry and Physics 1979 (Edition 60), also lists fpse and fpsm as standard abbreviations.

Electromagnetic FPS (EMU, stat-)
1 fpsm unit = 117.581866 cgsm unit (Biot-second)
Electrostatic FPS (ESU, ab-)
1 fpse unit = 3583.8953 cgse unit (Franklin)
1 fpse unit = 1.1954588×10^{−7} abs coulomb

=== Units of light ===
The candle and the foot-candle were the first defined units of light, defined in the Metropolitan Gas Act (1860). The foot-candle is the intensity of light at one foot from a standard candle. The units were internationally recognized in 1881, and adopted into the metric system.

== Conversions ==
Together with the fact that the term "weight" is used for the gravitational force in some technical contexts (physics, engineering) and for mass in others (commerce, law), and that the distinction often does not matter in practice, the coexistence of variants of the FPS system causes confusion over the nature of the unit "pound". Its relation to international metric units is expressed in kilograms, not newtons, though, and in earlier times it was defined by means of a mass prototype to be compared with a two-pan balance which is agnostic of local gravitational differences.

In July 1959, the various national foot and avoirdupois pound standards were replaced by the international foot of precisely 0.3048 m and the international pound of precisely 0.45359237 kg, making conversion between the systems a matter of simple arithmetic. The conversion for the poundal is given by 1 pdl = 1 lb·ft/s^{2} = 0.138254954376 N (precisely).

To convert between the absolute and gravitational FPS systems one needs to fix the standard acceleration g which in EE relates the pound-mass to the pound-force.

$$1\,\text{lbf} = 1\,\text{lb}\cdot g$$

While g strictly depends on one's location on the Earth surface, since 1901 in most contexts it is fixed conventionally at precisely g_{0} = 9.80665 m/s^{2} ≈ 32.17405 ft/s^{2} (standard gravity).

== See also ==
- Metre–tonne–second system of units (MTS)
- FFF system
- Mars Climate Orbiter
