= Dyne =

Unit of force in the CGS system

dyne
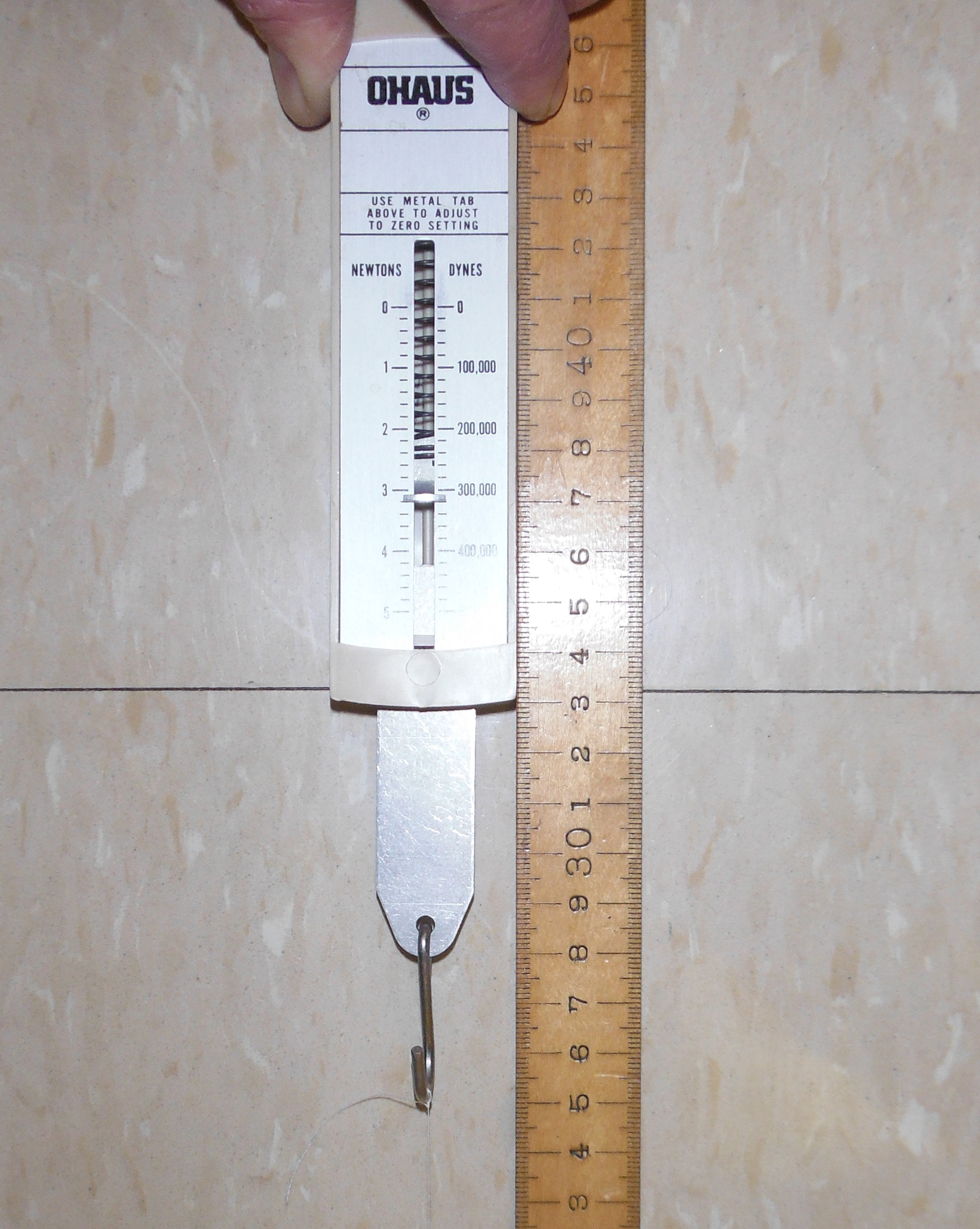
- Ohaus spring scale displaying force measurements in both newtons and dynes

General information
- Unit system: CGS units
- Unit of: force
- Symbol: dyn

Conversions
1 dyn in ...	... is equal to ...
- CGS base units: 1 g⋅cm/s^{2}
- SI units: 10^{−5} N
- British Gravitational System: 2.248089×10^{−6} lbf

The dyne (symbol: dyn; from Ancient Greek δύναμις (dúnamis) 'power, force') is a derived unit of force specified in the centimetre–gram–second (CGS) system of units, a predecessor of the modern SI.

== History ==
The name dyne was first proposed as a CGS unit of force in 1873 by a Committee of the British Association for the Advancement of Science, and is from Ancient Greek δύναμις ('force', 'power').

== Definition ==
The dyne is defined as "the force required to accelerate a mass of one gram at a rate of one centimetre per second squared". An equivalent definition of the dyne is "that force which, acting for one second, will produce a change of velocity of one centimetre per second in a mass of one gram".

One dyne is equal to 10 micronewtons, 10^{−5} N or to 10 nsn in the old metre–tonne–second system of units.

- 1 dyn = 1 g⋅cm/s^{2} = 10^{−5} kg⋅m/s^{2} = 10^{−5} N
- 1 N = 1 kg⋅m/s^{2} = 10^{5} g⋅cm/s^{2} = 10^{5} dyn

Force units
	Newtons	Dynes	Kilograms-force kiloponds	Pounds	Poundals
1 N	≡ 1 kg⋅m/s^{2}	= 100000 dyn	≈ 0.10197 kgf	≈ 0.22481 lb	≈ 7.23301 pdl
1 dyn	= 1×10^{−5} N	≡ 1 g⋅cm/s^{2}	≈ 1.01972×10^{−6} kgf	≈ 2.24809×10^{−6} lb	≈ 7.23301×10^{−5} pdl
1 kgf	= 9.80665 N	= 980665 dyn	≡ g_{n} × 1 kg	≈ 2.20462 lb	≈ 70.9316 pdl
1 lb	≈ 4.44822 N	≈ 444822 dyn	≈ 0.45359 kgf	≡ g_{n} × 1 lb_{m} / .3048 m/ft	≈ 32.1740 pdl
1 pdl	≈ 0.13825 N	≈ 13825.5 dyn	≈ 0.01410 kgf	≈ 0.03108 lbf	≡ 1 lb_{m}⋅ft/s^{2}

== Use ==
The dyne per centimetre is a unit traditionally used to measure surface tension. For example, the surface tension of distilled water is 71.99 dyn/cm at 25 °C (77 °F). (In SI units this is 71.99×10^{−3} N/m or 71.99 mN/m.)

== See also ==
- Centimetre–gram–second system of units
- Erg
