= Mercury pressure gauge =

Type of manometer

An open (differential) mercury pressure gauge

A mercury pressure gauge is a type of manometer using mercury as the working fluid. The most basic form of this instrument is a U-shaped glass tube filled with mercury. More complex versions deal with very high pressure or have better means of filling with mercury.

== Description ==
The instrument consists of a glass U-tube half-filled with mercury. One end is connected to the vessel whose pressure is being measured. The other may be either left open or sealed. If it is left open, the pressure measured is relative to air pressure, which is variable. If it is sealed, the pressure measured is the absolute pressure. The tube is sealed during manufacture with the sealed end containing a vacuum. Mercury is a useful material to use in a manometer because of its high density. This means that a much shorter column is needed compared to water. For instance, the pressure represented by a column of 100 mm of water is just under 7.4 mm of mercury (mmHg).

The pressure is determined by measuring the difference in height between the reference column and the column connected to the item under test. Calibration marks are usually provided to aid in this measurement and in laboratories a cathetometer might be employed for accuracy. When relative pressure is being measured the difference may be negative, meaning the test pressure is below the reference pressure. The ubiquity of this instrument led to mmHg becoming a common unit of measure of pressure. It is also related to another unit of pressure, the torr. The mmHg is not an SI unit but is still sometimes found in use, particularly in medicine. In SI units, 1 mmHg is approximately 133 Pa .

== Filling with mercury ==
Zimmerli's mercury pressure gauge

The initial filling of a sealed gauge with mercury can be problematic. One method involves fusing the glass of the gauge to a vessel of mercury, pumping out the air and boiling the mercury. After filling, the gauge is then cut away again. Further, the vacuum in the gauge eventually deteriorates due to slow diffusion of gases through the mercury, making the device inaccurate.

In 1938, Adolph Zimmerli (1886–1967) invented a gauge that overcame the filling problems, at least for pressures below ambient pressure. Zimmerli's gauge consists of three relatively wide columns. Referring to the diagram, the columns in the centre and on the right function as a standard U-tube gauge. Additionally, the top of the centre column is connected to the bottom of the third column on the left with a capillary tube. The centre column is initially completely filled with mercury, as is the connecting capillary. The other two columns are partially filled. The top of both the main column on the right and the reservoir column on the left are connected together and to an inlet for the pressure to be measured. When the test pressure is applied, the mercury rises in both the left and right columns and falls in the centre column. The mercury at the top of the capillary breaks and a vacuum forms there. The pressure is then measured in the usual way by the difference between the heights of the right and centre columns.

Since a new vacuum is formed each time a measurement is made, there is no problem with the vacuum becoming contaminated. Any bubbles that do form in the capillary are easily removed by inverting the gauge and shaking or tapping.

== High pressure measurement ==
Kamerlingh Onnes mercury pressure gauge

For extremely high pressures, the column can still be very high, even when using mercury. Gauges for measuring pressure in the range 20–30 standard atmospheres (15,000–23,000 mmHg) have been built. A 23-metre-tall mercury column is difficult to read and suffers from inaccuracies caused by different parts of the column being at different temperatures. A more compact mercury pressure gauge suitable for high pressure was built by Heike Kamerlingh Onnes, the discoverer of superconductivity. This consisted of a series of mercury filled U-tubes connected together with inverted U-tubes. The inverted U-tubes contain compressed air at a pressure designed to bring the instrument into the pressure range of interest. The pressure is found from this instrument by summing together the difference in column heights in each of the U-tubes.

== History ==
The parent of all mercury pressure gauges is the mercury barometer invented by Evangelista Torricelli in 1643. An early engineering application of the mercury pressure gauge was to measure pressure in steam boilers during the age of steam. The first use on steam engines was by James Watt while developing the Watt steam engine between 1763 and 1775. This engine was a development of the popular Newcomen atmospheric engine. A gauge for use on steam engines very similar to the later Kamerlingh-Onnes gauge was patented in 1858 by Thomas Purssglove. Like the Kamerlingh-Onnes device, it had multiple U-tubes connected in series. The connecting tubes were filled with an incompressible fluid.

The instrument was formerly widely used in education, laboratories, and medical measurements as well as its industrial applications. However, the toxicity of mercury and the risk of spills, through broken glassware, has led to its decline. It is also easier to interface other types of sensor to electronic systems. By 1991 it had mostly been replaced by other technologies.

== Use as a standard ==
Mercury gauges are commonly used as the primary standard for pressure by national measurement standards laboratories. For instance, the National Institute of Standards and Technology (NIST) in the US uses a gauge that is three metres tall and contains 225 kg of mercury. For precision, ultrasonics are used to measure the mercury column height. However, in 2019 the backup gauge was decommissioned after being out of service for years. It was so large that it could not be removed by normal means; a hole was cut in the ceiling to extract it. The decommissioning was part of an international move to stop using mercury in standards laboratories for environmental reasons. NIST will eventually also take the main mercury gauge out of service after a portable photonic device is installed to replace it.

== See also ==
- McLeod gauge, a type of mercury pressure gauge used for calibrating electronic pressure gauges

== Bibliography ==
- COWI Consulting Engineers and Planners, Mercury: A Global Pollutant Requiring Global Initiatives, Nordic Council of Ministers, 2002 ISBN 9289307544.
- Hála, Eduard; Pick, Jiří; Fried, Vojtěch; Vilím, O.; Standart, George (trans), Vapour–Liquid Equilibrium, Pergamon Press, 1967 (Elsevier reprint, 2013 ISBN 1483160866).
- Herman, Irving, Physics of the Human Body, Springer Science & Business Media, 2007 ISBN 3540296042.
- Kopp, Brian, "Industrial telemetry", ch. 18 in, Telemetry Systems Engineering, Artech House, 2002 ISBN 1580532578.
- Kotz, John C.; Treichel, Paul M.; Townsend, John R., Chemistry and Chemical Reactivity, vol. 1, Cengage Learning, 2008 ISBN 0495387118.
- Lechevalier, Hubert A., "The Waksman Institute of Microbiology, 1954 to 1984", The Journal of the Rutgers University, vol. 49–51, pp. 20–45, Associated Friends of the Library of Rutgers University, 1987.
- Lee, Jennifer Lauren, "No longer under pressure: NIST dismantles giant mercury manometer", NIST, 28 June 2019/15 January 2020, retrieved and archived 29 August 2020.
- Lindh, Wilburta Q.; Pooler, Marilyn S.; Tamparo, Carol D.; Dahl, Barbara M., Delmar's Clinical Medical Assisting, Cengage Learning, 2009 ISBN 1435419251.
- Mack, Donald M., Instrumentman 1 & C, United States Government Priniting Office, 1990 (1973 edition LCCN 73-603249).
- Purssglove, Thomas Paramore, "Pressure gauge", English Patents of Inventions, Specifications: 1858, 2675-2752, patent no. 2739, filed 1 December 1858, issued 31 May 1859.
- Singh, Sarbjit, Experiments in Fluid Mechanics, PHI Learning, 2012 ISBN 8120345118.
- Stein, Benjamin, Building Technology: Mechanical and Electrical Systems, John Wiley & Sons, 1996 ISBN 0471593192.
- Suski, J.; Puers, R.; Ehrlich, C.D.; Schmidt, J.W.; Abramson, E.H.; Sutton, C.M., "Pressure", ch. 3 in, Goodwin, A.R.H.; Marsh, K.N.; Wakeham, W.A. (eds), Experimental Thermodynamics (vol. 6): Measurement of the Thermodynamic Properties of Single Phases, Elsevier, 2003 ISBN 008053144X.
- Zimmerli, Adolph, "An improved mercury U-gage", Industrial & Engineering Chemistry: Analytical Edition, vol. 10, iss. 5, pp. 283–284, 1 May 1938.
