= Herbert McLeod =

English chemist

- Born: 16 April 1841; Stoke Newington, England
- Died: 1 October or 3 October 1923 (aged 82)
- Education: Royal College of Chemistry
- Known for: invention of a McLeod gauge
- Scientific career
- Fields: chemistry
- Workplaces: Royal Indian Engineering College

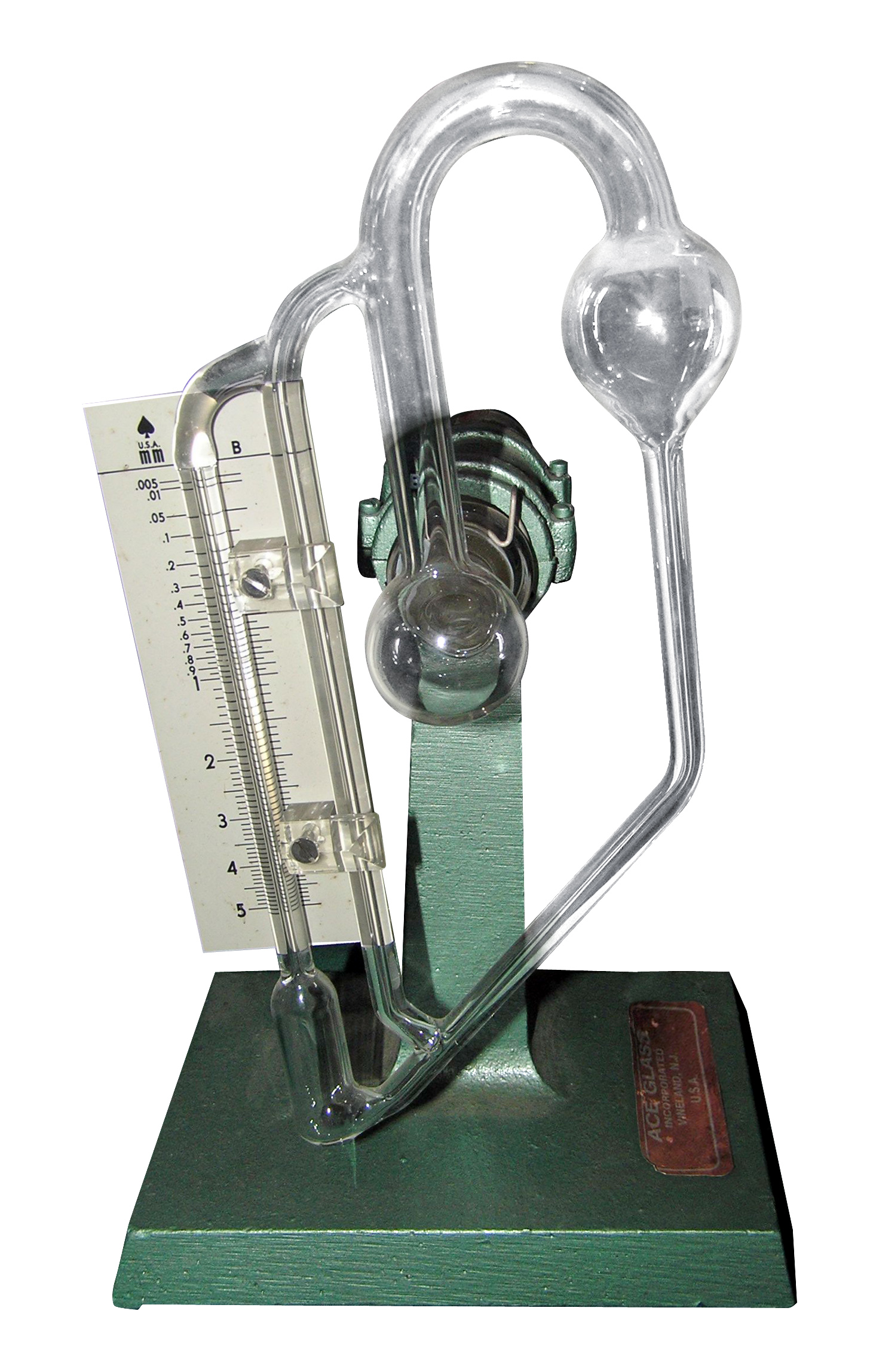
A glass McLeod gauge, drained of mercury

Herbert McLeod (/məˈklaʊd/ mə-KLOWD; February 1841 – October 1923), FRS, was an English chemist, noted for the invention of the McLeod gauge and for the invention of a sunshine recorder.

== Biography ==
McLeod was born in Stoke Newington on 9 Feb 1841 and died 3 October 1923, while other biographies state that he was born in Stoke Newington on 19 February 1841 and died 1 October 1923, a further alternative biography states that he was born 19 February 1842 in the adjacent area of Stamford Hill, North London, and died in Richmond, Surrey on 1 October 1923.

McLeod was educated at Stockwell Grammar School. In 1855 he started studying chemistry in London with George Frederick Ansell. In 1856 he joined the Royal College of Chemistry, London. He worked as lecture assistant of August Wilhelm von Hofmann from 1860 on. When Hofman received a call to the University of Berlin he joined him, but came back after a short time to the Royal College of Chemistry. McLeod became assistant of Edward Frankland. He largely stayed at the college until 1871. McLeod was appointed professor at the Royal Indian Engineering College, where he stayed till his retirement in 1901. McLeod helped Lord Salisbury, later Prime Minister, with some experiments in the 1860s

During his time at the Indian Engineering College he worked on various subjects including meteorology, physics and chemistry. In 1874 he published a paper with a new and innovative vacuum gauge, this is known as the McLeod gauge. McLeod was elected a fellow of the Royal Society in 1881 and from 1888 he was in charge of proof-reading the Royal Society's Catalogue of Scientific papers. He carried on the work with the Catalogue of the Royal Society til 1915 when his health did not allow him to continue.

He married Amelia Woodley, with whom he had 3 sons and 2 daughters.

He was a Fellow of the Chemical Society, and of the Royal Society, and active in the British Association for the Advancement of Science. As a devout Christian, he tried to reconcile science with scripture.
