= DP cell =

Instrument that measures differential pressure

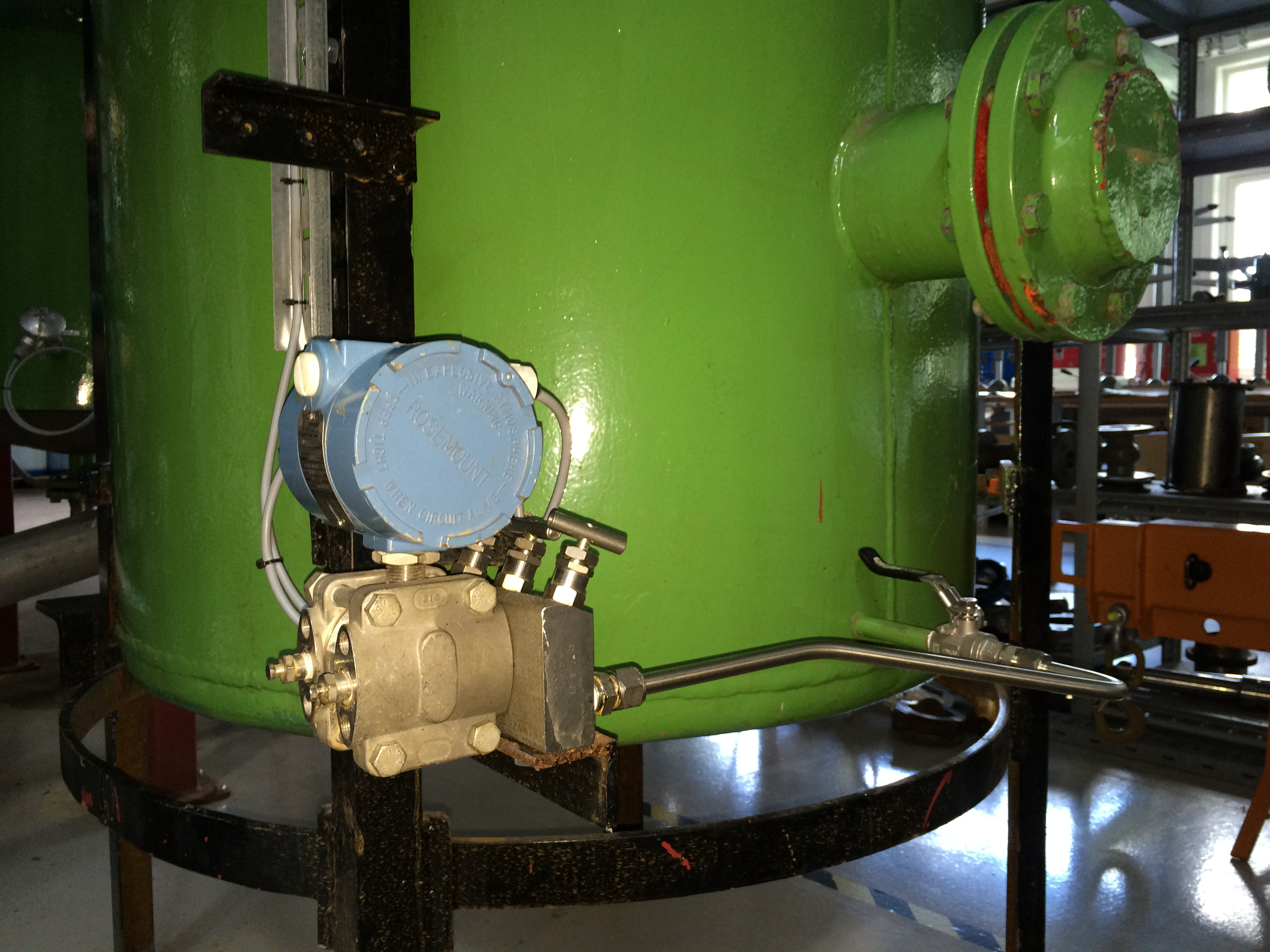
A DP cell used to measure the level of a tank

A DP cell is a device that measures the differential pressure between two inputs.

To measure the pressure difference between a container (or vessel) and the surrounding atmosphere, you may connect 'Hi' port of the DP-cell to a fitting that enters the vessel, using suitable tubing. The 'Lo' port, you leave open to the atmosphere (open air, or possibly through a buffer or desiccant chamber). The DP-cell will indicate the relative difference between the pressure of the vessel (container) and the atmospheric pressure.

This signal is often wired to an indicator that reads out locally, or remotely in a control room, and/or as a control (or feedback) signal to a valve, pump, or other control element to maintain a set pressure, or limit a maximum pressure. Typically, the signal is 4-20 mA DC loop current, where, usually, 4mA represents the minimum differential pressure and 20mA represents the maximum differential pressure. Alternatively, the signal may be a variable voltage, or digital information stream.

== See also ==
- Pressure measurement
