= Deadweight tester =

Device for checking the accuracy of a pressure gauge

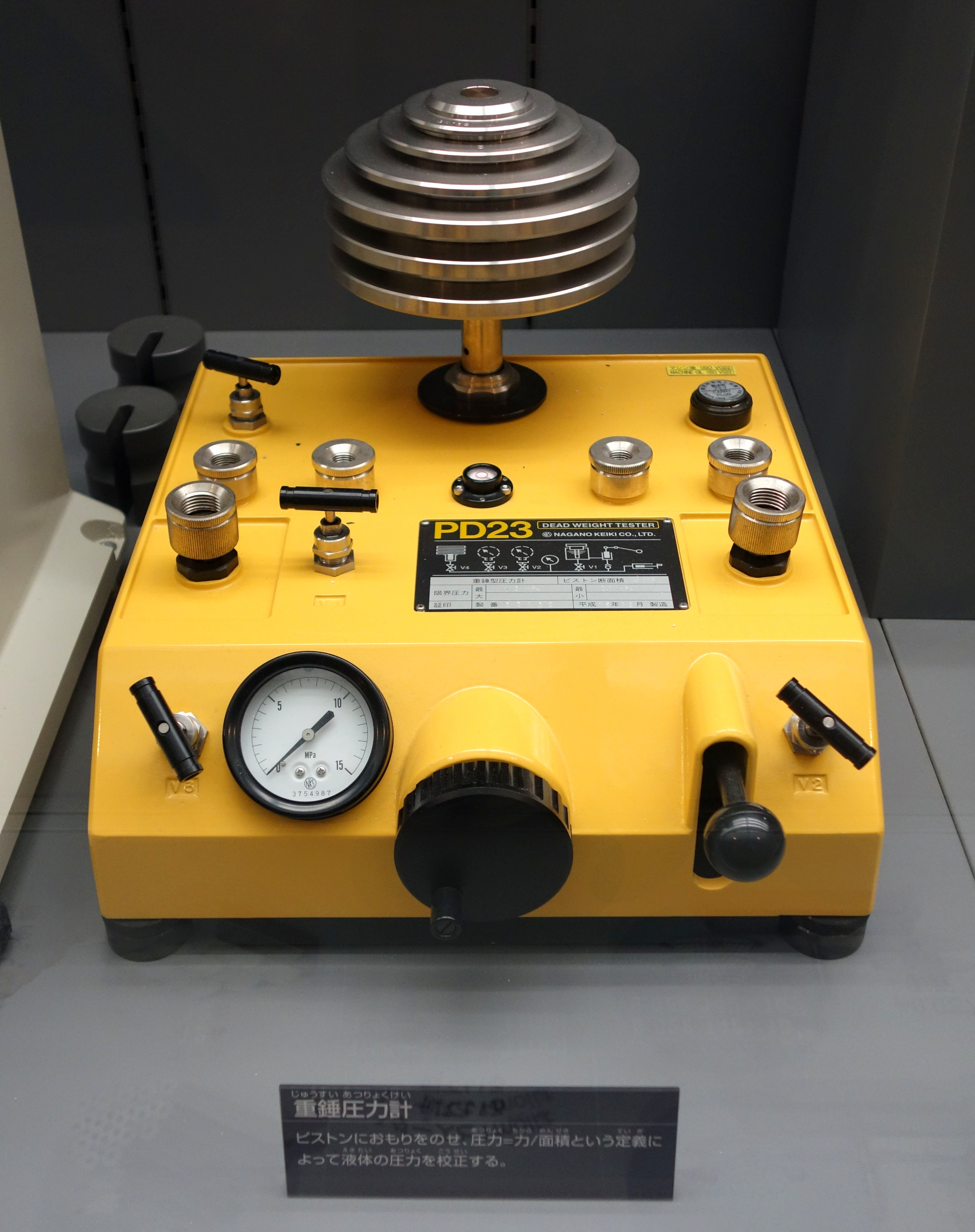
Dead weight tester, Type PD23, Nagano Keiki Co., Ltd.

A dead weight tester apparatus uses weights to apply pressure to a fluid for checking the accuracy of readings from a pressure gauge. A dead weight tester (DWT) is a calibration standard method that uses a piston cylinder on which a load is placed to make an equilibrium with an applied pressure underneath the piston. Deadweight testers are secondary standards which means that the pressure measured by a deadweight tester is defined through other quantities: length, mass and time. Typically deadweight testers are used in to calibrate pressure measuring devices.

== Formula ==
The formula on which the design of a DWT is based basically is expressed as follows :

p	=	F / A	[Pa]

where :

p	:	reference pressure	[Pa]
F	:	force applied on piston	[N]
A	:	effective area PCU	[m^{2}]

== Piston cylinder design ==
In general there are three different kind of DWT's divided by the medium which is measured and the lubricant which is used for its measuring element :

1. gas operated gas lubricated PCU's
2. gas operated oil lubricated PCU's
3. oil operated oil lubricated PCU's

== See also ==
- Blaise Pascal
  - Pascal (unit)
- Calibration
- Force gauge
- Piezometer
- Pressure measurement
- Pressure sensor
- Vacuum engineering
