= McLeod gauge =

Scientific instrument

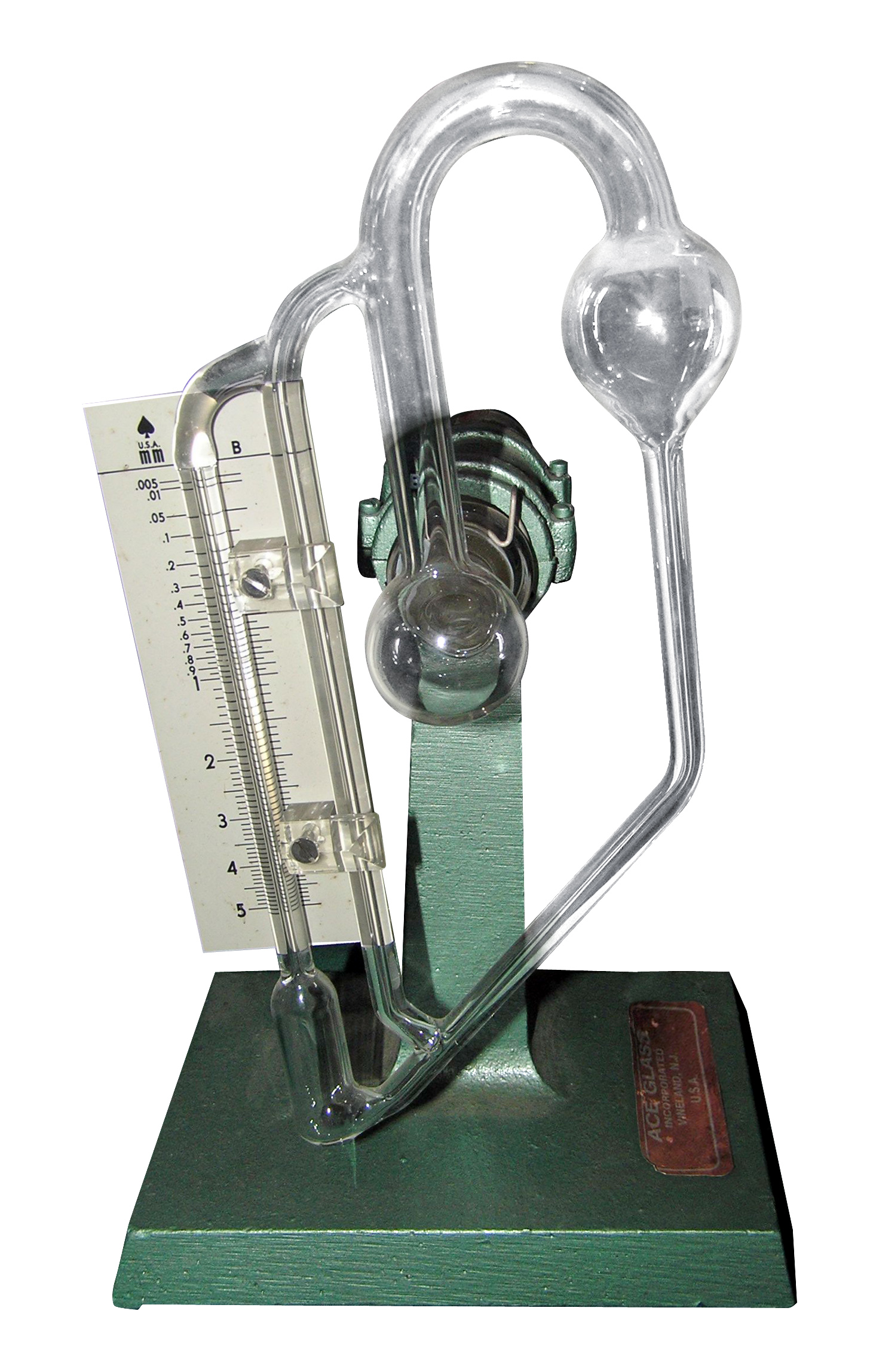
A glass McLeod gauge, drained of mercury

A McLeod gauge is a scientific instrument used to measure very low pressures, down to 10^{−6} Torr (0.133 mPa). It was invented in 1874 by Herbert McLeod (1841–1923). McLeod gauges were once commonly found attached to equipment that operates under vacuum, such as a lyophilizer. Today, however, these gauges have largely been replaced by electronic vacuum gauges.

The design of a McLeod gauge is somewhat similar to that of a mercury-column manometer. Typically it is filled with mercury. If used incorrectly, this mercury can escape and contaminate the vacuum system attached to the gauge.

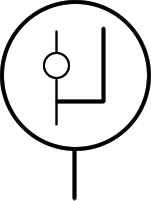
McLeod manometer symbol according to ISO 3753-1977 (E)

McLeod gauges operate by taking in a sample volume of gas from a vacuum chamber, then compressing it by tilting and infilling with mercury. The pressure in this smaller volume is then measured by a mercury manometer, and knowing the compression ratio (the ratio of the initial and final volumes), the pressure of the original vacuum can be determined by applying Boyle's law.

This method is fairly accurate for non-condensable gases, such as oxygen and nitrogen. However, condensable gases, such as water vapour, ammonia, carbon dioxide, and pump-oil vapors may be in gaseous form in the low pressure of the vacuum chamber, but will condense when compressed by the McLeod gauge. The result is an erroneous reading, showing a pressure much lower than actually present. A cold trap may be used in conjunction with a McLeod gauge to condense these vapors before they enter the gauge.

The McLeod gauge has the advantage that its calibration is nearly the same for all non-condensable gases. The device can be manually operated and the scale read visually, or the process can be automated in various ways. For example, a small electric motor can periodically rotate the assembly to collect a gas sample. If a fine platinum wire is in the capillary tube, its resistance indicates the height of the mercury column around it.

Modern electronic vacuum gauges are simpler to use, less fragile, and do not present a mercury hazard, but their reading is highly dependent on the chemical nature of the gas being measured, and their calibration is unstable. For this reason, McLeod gauges continue to be used as a calibration standard for electronic gauges.

== See also ==
- Penning gauge
- Pirani gauge
