= Metric system =

Decimal-based systems of measurement

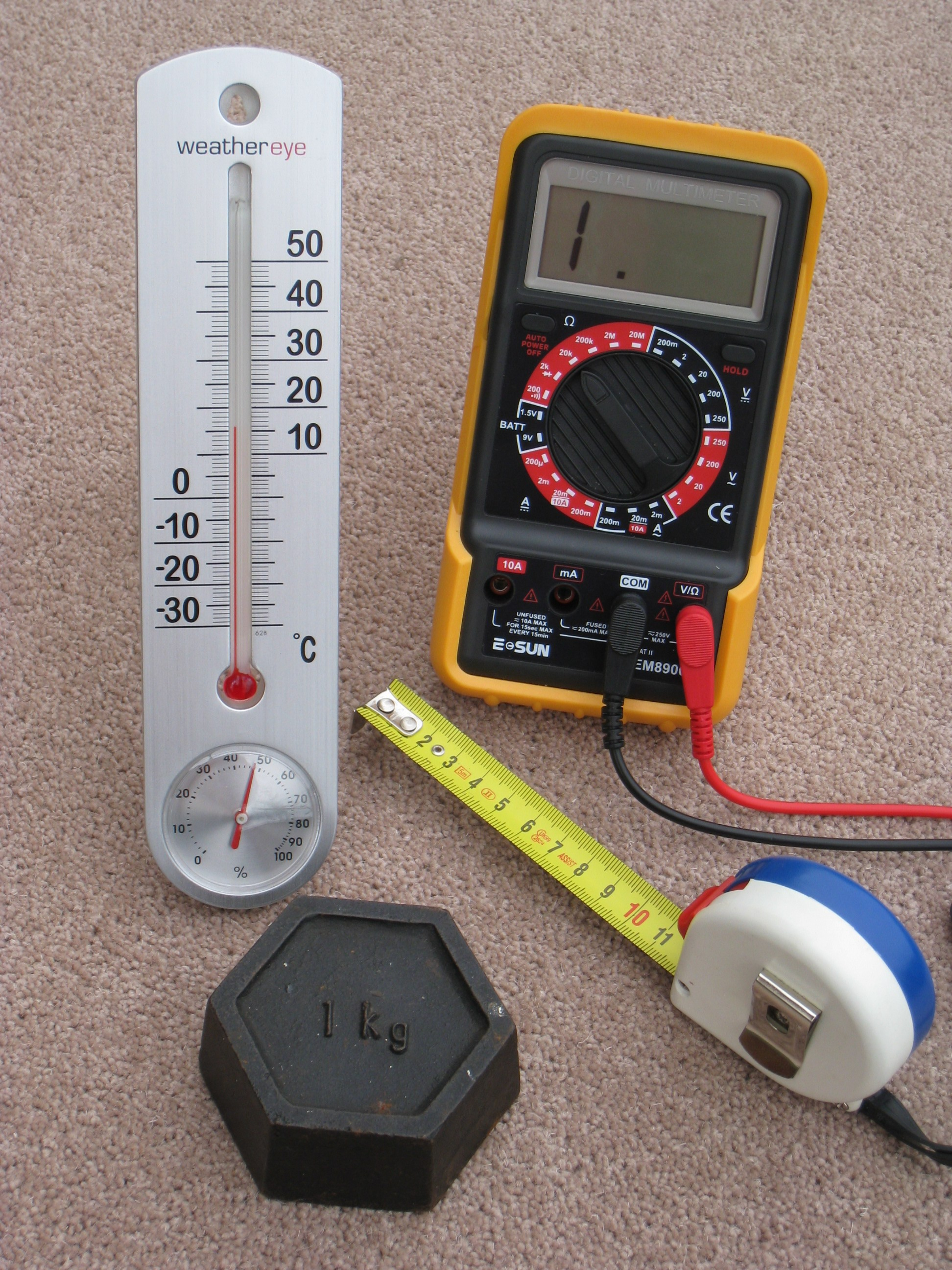
A kilogram mass and three metric measuring devices: a tape measure in centimetres, a thermometer in degrees Celsius, and a multimeter that measures potential in volts, current in amperes and resistance in ohms.

A system of measurement is a frame in which physical qualities (such as length, weight, temperature, etc.) can be quantified with numbers. Among many systems of measurement, the metric system refers to ones that standardise a set of base units and a nomenclature describing relatively large and small quantities using decimal-based multiplicative unit prefixes (such as kilo and milli). The International System of Units (SI) is a good example, and there are other widely accepted systems (less popular than SI) mainly used in specific fields, such as the Gaussian units for electromagnetism.

Though rules governing the metric system have changed over time, the modern definition in the International System of Units prescribes the metric prefixes and seven base units: metre (m), kilogram (kg), second (s), ampere (A), kelvin (K), mole (mol), and candela (cd).

An SI derived unit is a named combination of base units, such as the hertz (cycles per second), newton (kg⋅m/s^{2}), and tesla (1 kg⋅s^{−2}⋅A^{−1}). In the case of degrees Celsius (°C), it is a shifted scale derived from the kelvin (273.15 K is equal to 0 °C while 1 K interval is same to the 1 °C interval).

The SI system derives from the older metre-kilogram-second (MKS) system of units, though the definitions of the base units have evolved over time. Today, all base units are defined by physical constants – not by prototypes in the form of physical objects, as they were in the past.

Other metric system variants include the centimetre–gram–second system of units, the metre–tonne–second system of units, and the gravitational metric system. Each has unaffiliated metric units, and some of these systems are still used in limited contexts. Particular non-SI units such as the litre remain widely used.

== Adoption ==
Units in everyday use by country as of 2019

The SI system has been adopted as the official system of weights and measures in almost all countries of the world.

A notable outlier is the United States (US). Although it uses the system in some contexts, the US has resisted full adoption, and continues to use different measurement systems.

Adopting the metric system is known as metrication.

== Multiplicative prefixes ==
In the SI system and generally in older metric systems, multiples and fractions of a unit can be described via a prefix on a unit name that implies a decimal (base-10), multiplicative factor.

Metric prefixes in everyday use
Prefix	Symbol	Factor	Power
tera	T	1000000000000	10^{12}
giga	G	1000000000	10^{9}
mega	M	1000000	10^{6}
kilo	k	1000	10^{3}
hecto	h	100	10^{2}
deca	da	10	10^{1}
(none)	(none)	1	10^{0}
deci	d	0.1	10^{−1}
centi	c	0.01	10^{−2}
milli	m	0.001	10^{−3}
micro	μ	0.000001	10^{−6}
nano	n	0.000000001	10^{−9}
pico	p	0.000000000001	10^{−12}

The prefix kilo, for example, implies a factor of 1000 (10^{3}), and the prefix milli implies a factor of 1/1000 (10^{−3}). Thus, a kilometre is a thousand metres, and a milligram is one thousandth of a gram. These relations can be written symbolically as:

1 km = 1000 m
1 mg = 0.001 g

== Base units ==
The decimalised system is based on the metre, which had been introduced in France in the 1790s. The historical development of these systems culminated in the definition of the International System of Units (SI) in the mid-20th century, under the oversight of an international standards body.

The historical evolution of metric systems has resulted in the recognition of several principles. A set of independent dimensions of nature is selected, in terms of which all natural quantities can be expressed, called base quantities. For each of these dimensions, a representative quantity is defined as a base unit of measure. The definition of base units has increasingly been realised in terms of fundamental natural phenomena, in preference to copies of physical artefacts. A unit derived from the base units is used for expressing quantities of dimensions that can be derived from the base dimensions of the system—e.g., the square metre is the derived unit for area, which is derived from length. These derived units are coherent, which means that they involve only products of powers of the base units, without any further factors. For any given quantity whose unit has a name and symbol, an extended set of smaller and larger units is defined that are related by factors of powers of ten. The unit of time should be the second; the unit of length should be either the metre or a decimal multiple of it; and the unit of mass should be the gram or a decimal multiple of it.

Metric systems have evolved since the 1790s, as science and technology have evolved, in providing a single universal measuring system. Before and in addition to the SI, other metric systems include: the MKS system of units and the MKSA systems, which are the direct forerunners of the SI; the centimetre–gram–second (CGS) system and its subtypes, the CGS electrostatic (cgs-esu) system, the CGS electromagnetic (cgs-emu) system, and their still-popular blend, the Gaussian system; the metre–tonne–second (MTS) system; and the gravitational metric systems, which can be based on either the metre or the centimetre, and either the gram, gram-force, kilogram or kilogram-force.

== Attributes ==
=== Ease of learning and use ===
The metric system is intended to be easy to use and widely applicable, including units based on the natural world, decimal ratios, prefixes for multiples and sub-multiples, and a structure of base and derived units.

It is a coherent system with derived units built from base units using logical rather than empirical relationships and with multiples and submultiples of both units based on decimal factors and identified by a common set of prefixes.

=== Extensibility ===
The metric system is extensible since the governing body reviews, modifies and extends it needs arise. For example, the katal, a derived unit for catalytic activity equivalent to one mole per second (1 mol/s), was added in 1999.

=== Realisation ===
The base units used in a measurement system must be realisable. To that end, the definition of each SI base unit is accompanied by a mise en pratique (practical realisation) that describes at least one way that the unit can be measured. Where possible, definitions of the base units were developed so that any laboratory equipped with proper instruments would be able to realise a standard without reliance on an artefact held by another country. In practice, such realisation is done under the auspices of a mutual acceptance arrangement.

The metre was originally defined to be one ten millionth of the distance between the North Pole and the Equator through Paris.

In 1791 the commission originally defined the metre based on the size of the earth, equal to one ten-millionth of the distance from the equator to the North Pole. In the SI, the standard metre is now defined as exactly 1/299,792,458 of the distance that light travels in a second. The metre can be realised by measuring the length that a light wave travels in a given time, or equivalently by measuring the wavelength of light of a known frequency.

The kilogram was originally defined as the mass of one cubic decimetre of water at 4 °C, standardised as the mass of a man-made artefact of platinum–iridium held in a laboratory in France, which was used until a new definition was introduced in May 2019. Replicas made in 1879 at the time of the artefact's fabrication and distributed to signatories of the Metre Convention serve as de facto standards of mass in those countries. Additional replicas have been fabricated since as additional countries have joined the convention. The replicas were subject to periodic validation by comparison to the original, called the IPK. It became apparent that either the IPK or the replicas or both were deteriorating, and are no longer comparable: they had diverged by 50 μg since fabrication, so figuratively, the accuracy of the kilogram was no better than 5 parts in a hundred million or a relative accuracy of 5×10^{−8}. The revision of the SI replaced the IPK with an exact definition of the Planck constant as expressed in SI units, which defines the kilogram in terms of fundamental constants.

=== Base and derived unit structure ===
A base quantity is one of a conventionally chosen subset of physical quantities, where no quantity in the subset can be expressed in terms of the others. A base unit is a unit adopted for expressing a base quantity. A derived unit is used for expressing any other quantity, and is a product of powers of base units. For example, in the modern metric system, length has the unit metre and time has the unit second, and speed has the derived unit metre per second. Density, or mass per unit volume, has the unit kilogram per cubic metre.

=== Decimal ratios ===
A significant characteristic of the metric system is its use of decimal multiples – powers of 10. For example, a length that is significantly longer or shorter than 1 metre can be represented in units that are a power of 10 or 1000 metres. This differs from many older systems in which the ratio of different units varied. For example, 12 inches is one foot, but the larger unit in the same system, the mile is not a power of 12 feet. It is 5,280 feet – which is hard to remember for many.

In the early days, multipliers that were positive powers of ten were given Greek-derived prefixes such as kilo- and mega-, and those that were negative powers of ten were given Latin-derived prefixes such as centi- and milli-. However, 1935 extensions to the prefix system did not follow this convention: the prefixes nano- and micro-, for example have Greek roots. During the 19th century the prefix myria-, derived from the Greek word μύριοι (mýrioi), was used as a multiplier for 10000.

When applying prefixes to derived units of area and volume that are expressed in terms of units of length squared or cubed, the square and cube operators are applied to the unit of length including the prefix, as illustrated below.

1 mm^{2} (square millimetre)	= (1 mm)^{2}	= (0.001 m)^{2}	= 0.000001 m^{2}
1 km^{2} (square kilometre)	= (1 km)^{2}	= (1000 m)^{2}	= 1000000 m^{2}
1 mm^{3} (cubic millimetre)	= (1 mm)^{3}	= (0.001 m)^{3}	= 0.000000001 m^{3}
1 km^{3} (cubic kilometre)	= (1 km)^{3}	= (1000 m)^{3}	= 1000000000 m^{3}

For the most part, the metric prefixes are used uniformly for SI units, but for large measures of seconds, the non-SI units of minute, hour and day are customary instead.

=== Coherence ===
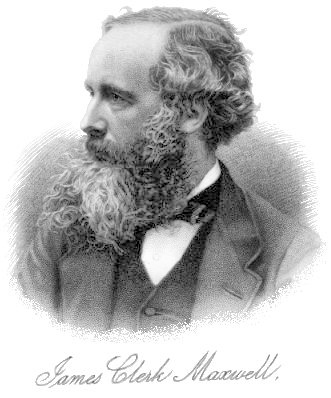
James Clerk Maxwell played a major role in developing the concept of a coherent CGS system and in extending the metric system to include electrical units.

Each variant of the metric system has a degree of coherence—the derived units are directly related to the base units without the need for intermediate conversion factors. For example, in a coherent system the units of force, energy, and power are chosen so that the equations

force	=	mass	×	acceleration
energy	=	force	×	distance
energy	=	power	×	time

hold without the introduction of unit conversion factors. Once a set of coherent units has been defined, other relationships in physics that use this set of units will automatically be true. Therefore, Einstein's mass–energy equation, E = mc^{2}, does not require extraneous constants when expressed in coherent units.

The CGS system had two units of energy, the erg that was related to mechanics and the calorie that was related to thermal energy; so only one of them (the erg) could bear a coherent relationship to the base units. Coherence was a design aim of SI, which resulted in only one unit of energy being defined – the joule.

=== Rationalisation ===
Maxwell's equations of electromagnetism contained a factor of $1/(4\pi)$ relating to steradians, representative of the fact that electric charges and magnetic fields may be considered to emanate from a point and propagate equally in all directions, i.e. spherically. This factor made equations more awkward than necessary, and so Oliver Heaviside suggested adjusting the system of units to remove it.

== Everyday notions ==
The basic units of the metric system have always represented commonplace quantities or relationships in nature, even with modern refinements of definition and methodology. In cases where laboratory precision may not be required or available, or where approximations are good enough, the commonplace notions may suffice.

=== Time, length, volume and mass ===
The second is readily determined from the Earth's rotation period. Unlike other units, time multiples are not decimal. A second is 1/60 of a minute, which is 1/60 of an hour, which is 1/24 of a day, so a second is 1/86400 of a day.

The length of the equator is close to 40000000 m (more precisely 40075014.2 m). In fact, the dimensions of our planet were used by the French Academy in the original definition of the metre. A dining tabletop is typically about 0.75 metres high. A very tall human is about 2 metres tall.

The mass of a litre of cold water is very close to 1 kilogram. Therefore, 1 millilitre of water occupies 1 cubic centimetre and has a mass of 1 gram.

A 1-euro coin has a mass of 7.5 g; a Sacagawea US 1-dollar coin has a mass of 8.1 g; the mass of a UK 50-pence coin is 8.0 g.

=== Temperature ===
In everyday use, the Celsius scale is more commonly used than the Kelvin scale; however, a temperature difference of one kelvin is the same as one degree Celsius. A temperature in kelvins is the temperature on the Celsius scale plus about 273. Water freezes at about 0 °C (273 K) and boils at about 100 °C (373 K) at sea level; human body temperature is about 37 °C (310 K).

=== Brightness ===
A candela is about the luminous intensity of a moderately bright candle, or 1 candle power. A 60 watt tungsten-filament incandescent light bulb has a luminous intensity of about 800 lumens which is radiated equally in all directions (i.e. 4π steradians), thus is equal to I_{v} = (800 lm)/(4π sr) ≈ 64 cd.

=== Electricity ===
A 60 W incandescent light bulb consumes 0.5 A at 120 V (US mains voltage). A 60 W bulb rated at 230 V (European mains voltage) consumes 0.26 A at this voltage. This is evident from the formula P = I V.

=== Mole and mass relationship ===
A mole of a substance has a mass that is its molecular mass expressed in units of grams. The mass of a mole of carbon is 12.0 g, and the mass of a mole of table salt is 58.4 g.

Since all gases have the same volume per mole at a given temperature and pressure far from their points of liquefaction and solidification (see Perfect gas), and air is about 1/5 oxygen (molecular mass 32) and 4/5 nitrogen (molecular mass 28), the density of any near-perfect gas relative to air can be obtained to a good approximation by dividing its molecular mass by 29 (because 4/5 × 28 + 1/5 × 32 = 28.8 ≈ 29). For example, carbon monoxide (molecular mass 28) has almost the same density as air.

== History ==
The metric system was the result of multiple attempts at standardisation of weights and measures over many centuries, as earlier (Chinese, Egyptian, Greek, Roman, and other) systems of weights and measures interacted with one another through global trade.

=== 17th & 18th centuries ===
Around 1665–1670, Gabriel Mouton, a priest of the Collegiate Church of St Paul in Lyon, France, suggested that the many different systems of units then in use in France should be replaced by a single all-embracing decimal system. He proposed that linear measurements would be based on a natural standard of length, namely the length of one minute of arc of the largest circle that could be drawn round the Earth, and which he proposed to call one milliare. Mouton suggested that the unit of mass should be based on the unit of length, and on the mass density of water. While Mouton's contribution is sometimes overlooked, these ideas were clearly the basis over 120 years later, when the metric system was devised and standardised in France. During the final days of France's Ancien régime (1775-1788) and the early days of the French Revolution (1789–99), the first metric system was devised by chemists Antoine and Anne-Marie Lavoisier for the benefit of the Ferme générale in return for financial support of Antoine Lavoisier's research.

Following the model established by Mouton, Lavoisier's unit of length, the metre, was based on the dimensions of the Earth, and the unit of mass, the kilogram, was based on the mass of 1 litre of water (the volume of water which occupies 1 cubic decimetre of space, using the same unit of length).

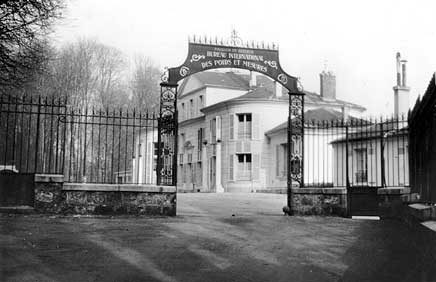
Pavillon de Breteuil, Saint-Cloud, France, the home of the metric system's Mètre des Archives and Kilogramme des Archives since 1875

The backwardness of the Ancien Régime left France with a need to reform its numerous systems of various local weights and measures. In 1790, Charles Maurice de Talleyrand-Périgord proposed Lavoisier's system based on natural units to the French National Assembly, without reference to the prior work of Mouton and Lavoisier. The aim was global adoption of the metric system. With the United Kingdom not responding to requests to collaborate in the development of the system, the French Academy of Sciences established a commission to implement this new standard alone, and in 1799, the new system was launched in France.

A number of different metric systems have since been developed, all using the Mètre des Archives and Kilogramme des Archives (or their descendants) as their base units, but differing in the definitions of the various derived units.

Variants of the metric system
Measure	SI/MKS	CGS	MTS
distance	metre (m)	centimetre (cm)	metre (m)
mass	kilogram (kg)	gram (g)	tonne (t)
time	second (s)	second (s)	second (s)
velocity	m/s	cm/s	m/s
acceleration	m/s^{2}	gal (Gal)	m/s^{2}
force	newton (N)	dyne (dyn)	sthene (sn)
pressure	pascal (Pa)	barye (Ba)	pièze (pz)
energy	joule (J)	erg (erg)	kilojoule (kJ)
power	watt (W)	erg/s (erg/s)	kilowatt (kW)
viscosity	Pa⋅s	poise (P)	pz⋅s

=== 19th century ===
In 1832, Gauss used the astronomical second as a base unit in defining the gravitation of the Earth, and together with the milligram and millimetre, this became the first system of mechanical units. He showed that the strength of a magnet could also be quantified in terms of these units, by measuring the oscillations of a magnetised needle and finding the quantity of "magnetic fluid" that produces an acceleration of one unit when applied to a unit mass. The centimetre–gram–second system of units (CGS) was the first coherent metric system, having been developed in the 1860s and promoted by James Clerk Maxwell and Lord Kelvin. In 1874, this system was formally promoted by the British Association for the Advancement of Science (BAAS). The system's characteristics are that density is expressed in g/cm^{3}, force expressed in dynes and mechanical energy in ergs. Thermal energy was defined in calories, one calorie being the energy required to raise the temperature of one gram of water from 15.5 °C to 16.5 °C. The Association also recognised two sets of units for electrical and magnetic properties – the electrostatic set of units and the electromagnetic set of units.

The CGS units of electricity were cumbersome to work with. This was remedied at the 1893 International Electrical Congress held in Chicago by defining the "international" ampere and ohm using definitions based on the metre, kilogram and second, in the International System of Electrical and Magnetic Units. During the same period in which the CGS system was being extended to include electromagnetism, other systems were developed, distinguished by their choice of coherent base unit, including the Practical System of Electric Units, or QES (quad–eleventhgram–second) system. Here, the base units are the quad, equal to 10^{7} m (approximately a quadrant of the Earth's circumference), the eleventhgram, equal to 10^{−11} g, and the second. These were chosen so that the corresponding electrical units of potential difference, current and resistance had a convenient magnitude.

=== 20th century ===
In 1901, Giovanni Giorgi showed that by adding an electrical unit as a fourth base unit, the various anomalies in electromagnetic systems could be resolved. The metre–kilogram–second–coulomb (MKSC) and metre–kilogram–second–ampere (MKSA) systems are examples of such systems.

The metre–tonne–second system of units (MTS) was based on the metre, tonne and second – the unit of force was the sthène and the unit of pressure was the pièze. It was invented in France for industrial use and from 1933 to 1955 was used both in France and in the Soviet Union. Gravitational metric systems use the kilogram-force (kilopond) as a base unit of force, with mass measured in a unit known as the hyl, Technische Masseneinheit (TME), mug or metric slug. Although the CGPM passed a resolution in 1901 defining the standard value of acceleration due to gravity to be 980.665 cm/s^{2}, gravitational units are not part of the International System of Units (SI).

=== Current ===
The International System of Units is the modern metric system. It is based on the metre–kilogram–second–ampere (MKSA) system of units from early in the 20th century. It also includes numerous coherent derived units for common quantities like power (watt) and irradience (lumen). Electrical units were taken from the International system then in use. Other units like those for energy (joule) were modelled on those from the older CGS system, but scaled to be coherent with MKSA units. Two additional base units – the kelvin, which is equivalent to degree Celsius for change in thermodynamic temperature but set so that 0 K is absolute zero, and the candela, which is roughly equivalent to the international candle unit of illumination – were introduced. Later, another base unit, the mole, a unit of amount of substance equivalent to the Avogadro number of specified molecules, was added along with several other derived units.

The system was promulgated by the General Conference on Weights and Measures (French: Conférence générale des poids et mesures – CGPM) in 1960. At that time, the metre was redefined in terms of the wavelength of a spectral line of the krypton-86 atom (krypton-86 being a stable isotope of an inert gas that occurs in undetectable or trace amounts naturally), and the standard metre artefact from 1889 was retired.

Today, the International System of Units consists of 7 base units and innumerable coherent derived units including 22 with special names. The last new derived unit, the katal for catalytic activity, was added in 1999. All the base units except the second are now defined in terms of exact and invariant constants of physics or mathematics, barring those parts of their definitions which are dependent on the second itself. As a consequence, the speed of light has now become an exactly defined constant, and defines the metre as 1/299,792,458 of the distance light travels in a second. The kilogram was defined by a cylinder of platinum-iridium alloy until a new definition in terms of natural physical constants was adopted in 2019. As of 2022, the range of decimal prefixes has been extended to those for 10^{30} (quetta–) and 10^{−30} (quecto–).

== See also ==
- Binary prefix – Prefix indicating a power of two
- Electrostatic units – Variant of the metric system
- History of measurement
- ISO 31 – Superseded standard on quantities and units
- ISO/IEC 80000 – International standard on physical quantities and units of measurement
- List of metric units – Class of units of measurement
- Metrology – Science of measurement and its application
- Outline of metrology and measurement – Topical index of English Wikipedia articles about metrology and measurement
- Preferred metric sizes – Metricated industry standards
- Unified Code for Units of Measure – System of codes for unambiguously representing measurement units
