= Erg (unit) =

CGS unit of energy and mechanical work

erg
- Unit system: CGS units
- Unit of: energy
- Symbol: erg
- Derivation: 1 erg = 1 dyn⋅cm

Conversions
| 1 erg in ... | ... is equal to ... |
- CGS base units: 1 cm^{2}⋅g⋅s^{−2}
- SI units: 10^{−7} J
- British Gravitational System: 7.375621×10^{−8} ft⋅lbf

The erg is a unit of energy equal to 10^{−7} joules (100 nJ). It is not an SI unit, instead originating from the older centimetre–gram–second system of units (CGS). Its name is derived from ergon (ἔργον), a Greek word meaning 'work' or 'task'.

An erg is the amount of work done by a force of one dyne exerted for a distance of one centimetre. In the CGS base units, it is equal to one gram centimetre-squared per second-squared (g⋅cm^{2}/s^{2}). It is thus equal to 10^{−7} joules or 100 nanojoules (nJ) in SI units.

- 1 erg = 10^{−7} J = 100 nJ
- 1 erg = 10^{−10} sn⋅m = 100 psn⋅m = 100 picosthène-metres
- 1 erg = 624.15 GeV = 6.2415×10^{11} eV
- 1 erg = 1 dyn⋅cm = 1 g⋅cm^{2}/s^{2}
- 1 erg = 2.77778×10^{−11} W⋅h

== History ==
In 1864, Rudolf Clausius proposed the Ancient Greek word ἔργον (ergon) for the unit of energy, work and heat. In 1873, a committee of the British Association for the Advancement of Science, including British physicists James Clerk Maxwell and William Thomson recommended the general adoption of the centimetre, the gramme, and the second as fundamental units (C.G.S. System of Units). To distinguish derived units, they recommended using the prefix "C.G.S. unit of ..." and requested that the word erg or ergon be strictly limited to refer to the C.G.S. unit of energy.

In 1922, chemist William Draper Harkins proposed the name micri-erg as a convenient unit to measure the surface energy of molecules in surface chemistry. It would equate to 10^{−14} ergs, the equivalent to 10^{−21} joules.

The erg is not a part of the International System of Units (SI), which has been recommended since 1 January 1978 when the European Economic Community ratified a directive of 1971 that implemented SI as agreed by the General Conference of Weights and Measures. It is the unit of energy in Gaussian units, which are widely used in astrophysics, applications involving microscopic problems and relativistic electrodynamics, and sometimes in mechanics.

== See also ==
- Foe (unit), relative measure for energy released by a supernova
- Lumen second, for the lumerg and lumberg units
- Metre–tonne–second system of units
