= Newton (unit) =

Unit of force in physics

newton
- Visualization of one newton of force

General information
- Unit system: SI
- Unit of: force
- Symbol: N
- Named after: Sir Isaac Newton

Conversions
1 N in ...	... is equal to ...
- SI base units: 1 kg⋅m⋅s^{−2}
- CGS units: 10^{5} dyn
- Imperial units: 0.224809 lbf

The newton (symbol: N) is the unit of force in the International System of Units (SI). Expressed in terms of SI base units, it is 1 kg⋅m/s^{2}, the force that accelerates a mass of one kilogram at one metre per second squared.

The unit is named after Isaac Newton in recognition of his work on classical mechanics, specifically his second law of motion.

== Definition ==
A newton is defined as 1 kg⋅m/s^{2} (it is a named derived unit defined in terms of the SI base units). One newton is, therefore, the force needed to accelerate one kilogram of mass at the rate of one metre per second squared in the direction of the applied force.

The units "metre per second squared" can be understood as measuring a rate of change in velocity per unit of time, i.e. an increase in velocity by one metre per second every second.

In 1946, the General Conference on Weights and Measures (CGPM) Resolution 2 standardized the unit of force in the MKS system of units to be the amount needed to accelerate one kilogram of mass at the rate of one metre per second squared. In 1948, the 9th CGPM Resolution 7 adopted the name newton for this force. The MKS system then became the blueprint for today's SI system of units. The newton thus became the standard unit of force in the Système international d'unités (SI), or International System of Units.

The newton is named after Isaac Newton. As with every SI unit named after a person, its symbol starts with an upper case letter (N), but when written in full, it follows the rules for capitalisation of a common noun; i.e., newton becomes capitalised at the beginning of a sentence and in titles but is otherwise in lower case.

The connection to Newton comes from Newton's second law of motion, which states that the force exerted on an object is directly proportional to the acceleration hence acquired by that object, thus:
$$F = ma,$$
where $m$ represents the mass of the object undergoing an acceleration $a$. When using the SI unit of mass, the kilogram (kg), and SI units for distance metre (m), and time, second (s) we arrive at the SI definition of the newton: 1 kg⋅m/s^{2}.

== Examples ==
At average gravity on Earth (conventionally, $g_\text{n}$ = 9.80665 m/s^{2}), a kilogram mass exerts a force of about 9.81 N.

- A person carrying a stone weighing 40 lb exerts 180 N on them.
- The Sun exerts 4×10^{22} N on the Earth, and vice versa.
- A small apple with mass 100 g exerts about one newton of force at Earth's surface, which we measure as the apple's weight on Earth.
  $$0.100 \text{ kg} \times 9.80665 \text{ m/s}^2 = 0.98\text { N}.$$

== Kilonewtons ==
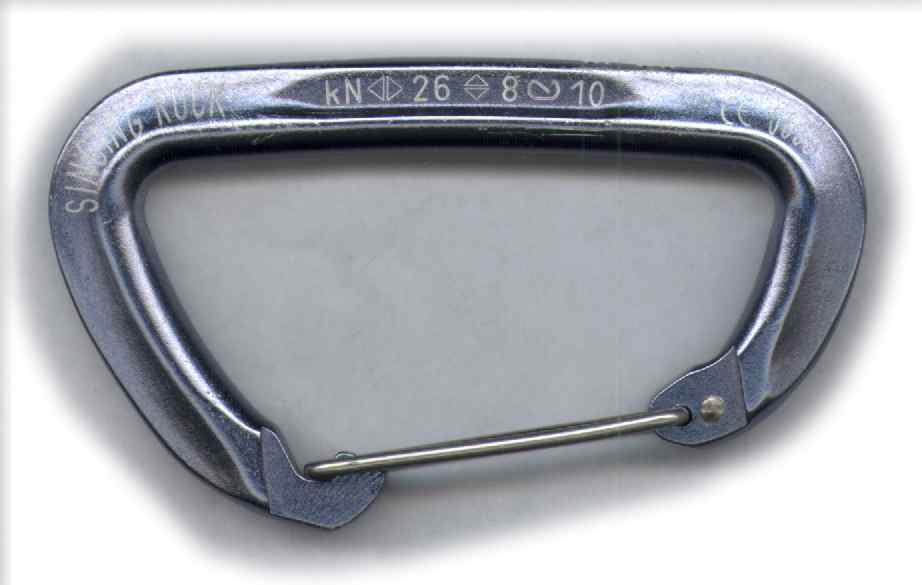
A carabiner used in rock climbing, with a safety rating of 26 kN when loaded along the spine with the gate closed, 8 kN when loaded perpendicular to the spine, and 10 kN when loaded along the spine with the gate open.

Large forces may be expressed in kilonewtons (kN), where 1 kN = 1000 N. For example, the tractive effort of a Class Y steam train locomotive and the thrust of an F100 jet engine are both around 130 kN.

Climbing ropes are tested by assuming a human can withstand a fall that creates 12 kN of force. The ropes must not break when tested against 5 such falls.

== Conversion factors ==
Force units
	Newtons	Dynes	Kilograms-force kiloponds	Pounds	Poundals
1 N	≡ 1 kg⋅m/s^{2}	= 100000 dyn	≈ 0.10197 kgf	≈ 0.22481 lb	≈ 7.23301 pdl
1 dyn	= 1×10^{−5} N	≡ 1 g⋅cm/s^{2}	≈ 1.01972×10^{−6} kgf	≈ 2.24809×10^{−6} lb	≈ 7.23301×10^{−5} pdl
1 kgf	= 9.80665 N	= 980665 dyn	≡ g_{n} × 1 kg	≈ 2.20462 lb	≈ 70.9316 pdl
1 lb	≈ 4.44822 N	≈ 444822 dyn	≈ 0.45359 kgf	≡ g_{n} × 1 lb_{m} / .3048 m/ft	≈ 32.1740 pdl
1 pdl	≈ 0.13825 N	≈ 13825.5 dyn	≈ 0.01410 kgf	≈ 0.03108 lbf	≡ 1 lb_{m}⋅ft/s^{2}

Three approaches to units of mass and force or weight
Base	Force		Weight		Mass			
2nd law of motion	F = m ⋅ a		F = (W ⋅ a)/g		m = F/a			
System	BG	GM	EE	M	AE	CGS	MTS	SI
Acceleration (a)	ft/s^{2}	m/s^{2}	ft/s^{2}	m/s^{2}	ft/s^{2}	Gal	m/s^{2}	m/s^{2}
Mass (m)	slug	hyl	pound-mass	kilogram	pound	gram	tonne	kilogram
Force (F), weight (W)	pound	kilopond	pound-force	kilopond	poundal	dyne	sthène	newton
Pressure (p)	pound per square inch	technical atmosphere	pound-force per square inch	standard atmosphere	poundal per square foot	barye	pieze	pascal

SI multiples of newton (N)
Submultiples			Multiples		
Value	SI symbol	Name	Value	SI symbol	Name
10^{−1} N	dN	decinewton	10^{1} N	daN	decanewton
10^{−2} N	cN	centinewton	10^{2} N	hN	hectonewton
10^{−3} N	mN	millinewton	10^{3} N	kN	kilonewton
10^{−6} N	μN	micronewton	10^{6} N	MN	meganewton
10^{−9} N	nN	nanonewton	10^{9} N	GN	giganewton
10^{−12} N	pN	piconewton	10^{12} N	TN	teranewton
10^{−15} N	fN	femtonewton	10^{15} N	PN	petanewton
10^{−18} N	aN	attonewton	10^{18} N	EN	exanewton
10^{−21} N	zN	zeptonewton	10^{21} N	ZN	zettanewton
10^{−24} N	yN	yoctonewton	10^{24} N	YN	yottanewton
10^{−27} N	rN	rontonewton	10^{27} N	RN	ronnanewton
10^{−30} N	qN	quectonewton	10^{30} N	QN	quettanewton

== See also ==
- Force gauge – Instrument for measuring force
- International System of Units – Modern form of the metric system
- joule – SI unit of energy
- kilogram-force – Weight on earth of a one-kilogram mass
- kip (unit) – US customary unit of force
- newton-metre – SI unit of torque
- Orders of magnitude (force) – Comparison of a wide range of physical forces
- Pascal (unit) – SI derived unit of pressure
- pound (force) – Unit of force
- sthène – Obsolete unit of force; same as 1 kilonewton
