= List of natural phenomena =

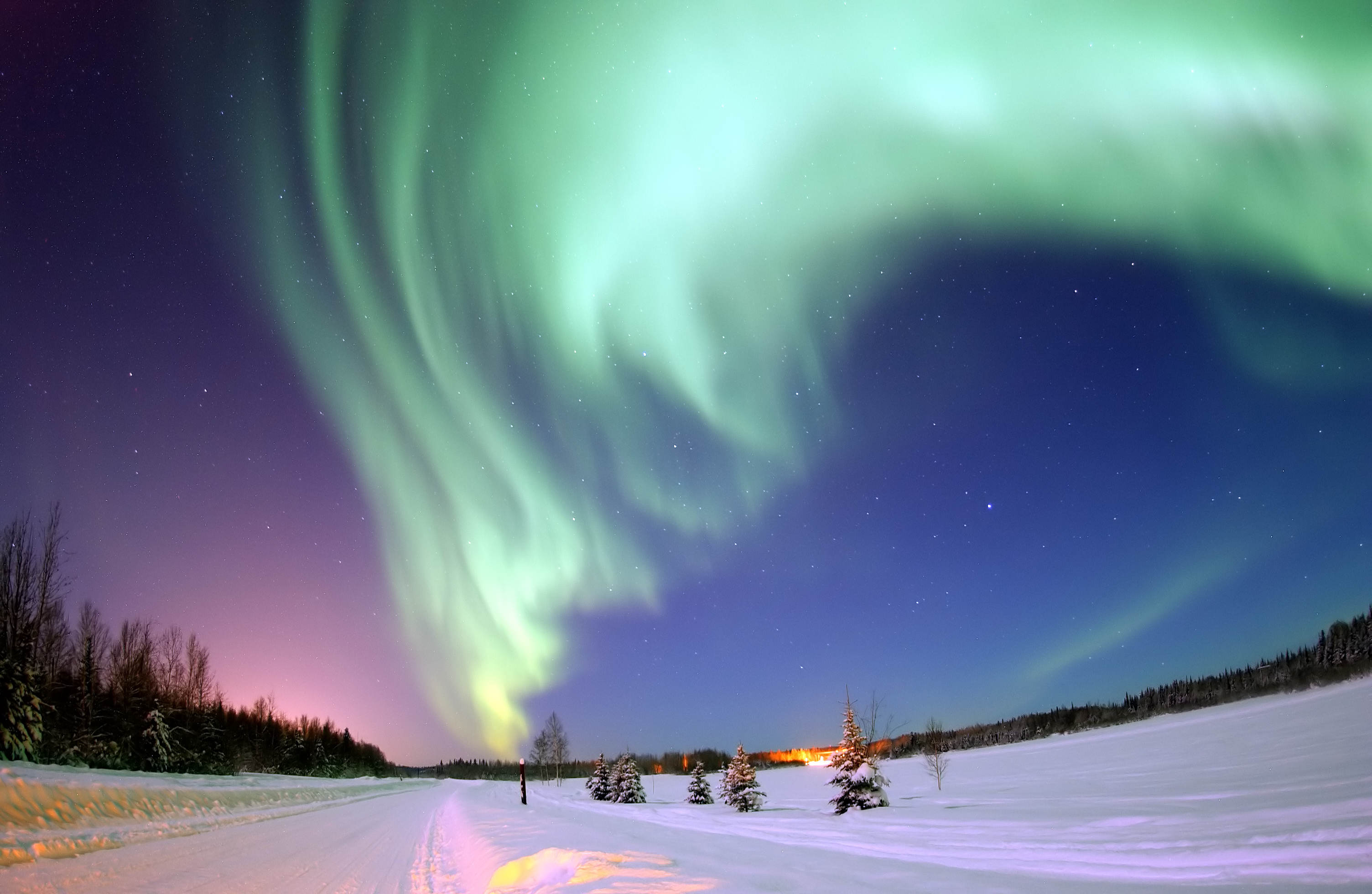
An aurora is a natural phenomenon.

A natural phenomenon is an observable event that is not man-made. Examples include: sunrise, weather, fog, thunder, tornadoes; biological processes, decomposition, germination; physical processes, wave propagation, erosion; tidal flow, and natural disasters such as electromagnetic pulses, volcanic eruptions, hurricanes and earthquakes.

== Physical phenomena ==
The act of:

- Freezing
- Boiling
- Gravity
- Magnetism

=== Gallery ===
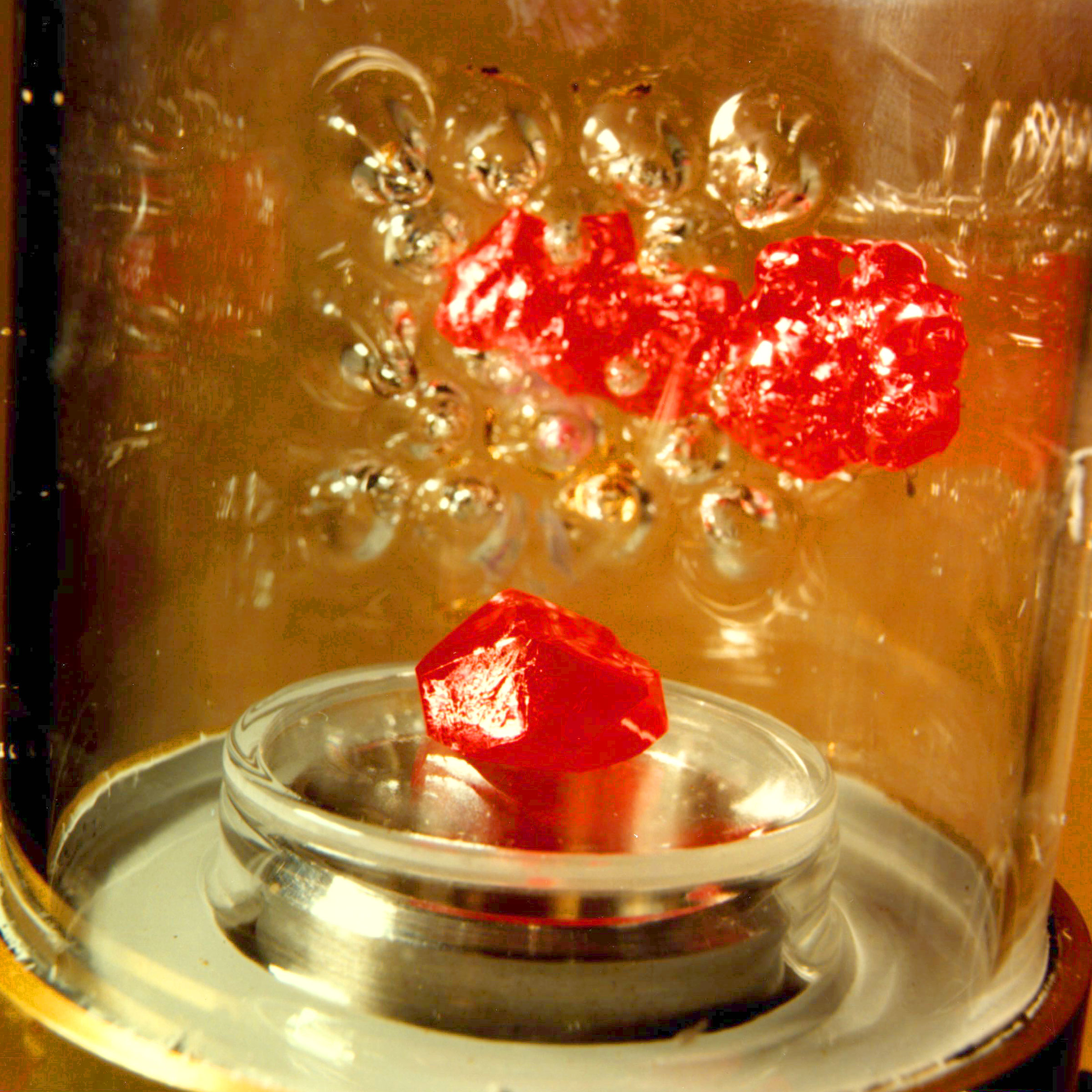
Crystal in VCGS furnace

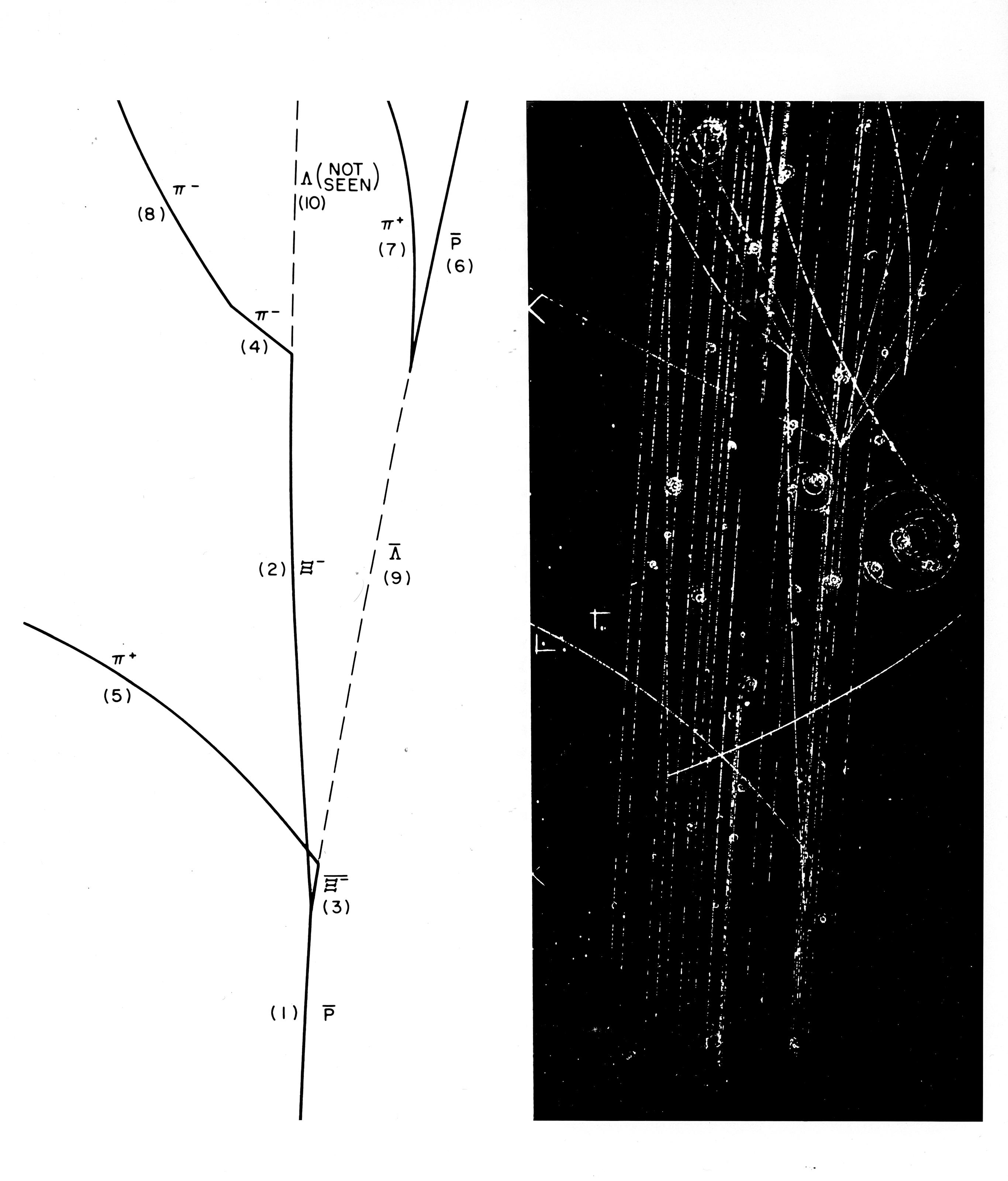
Liquid hydrogen bubble chamber photograph of an anti-proton colliding with a proton

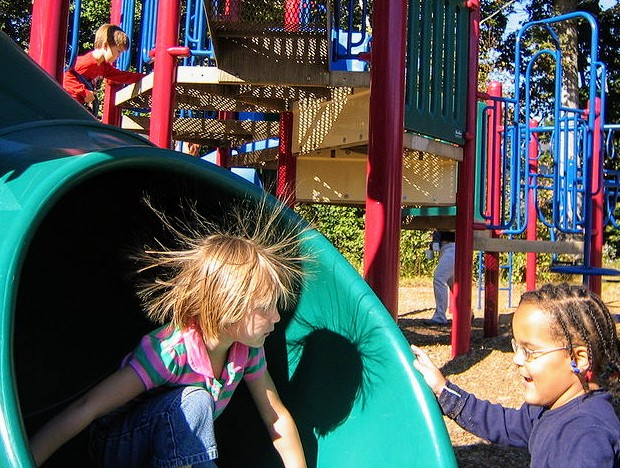
Children notice an effect of static electricity

== Chemical phenomena ==
- Oxidation
  - Fire
  - Rusting

== Biological phenomena ==
- Metabolism
  - Catabolism
  - Anabolism
  - Decomposition – by which organic substances are broken down into a much simpler form of matter
  - Fermentation – converts sugar to acids, gases and/or alcohol.
- Growth
- Birth
- Death
- Population decrease

=== Gallery ===
Decomposition:a decaying peach over a period of six days. Each frame is approximately 12 hours apart, as the fruit shrivels and becomes covered with mold.

== Astronomical phenomena ==
- Supernova
- Gamma ray bursts
- Quasars
- Blazars
- Pulsars
- Cosmic microwave background radiation
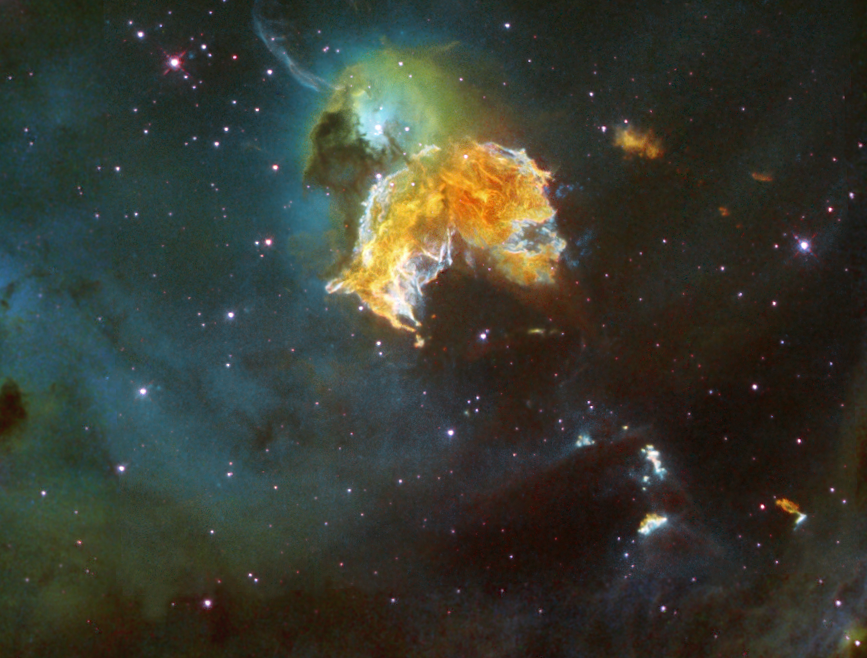
Supernova

== Geological phenomena ==
- Mineralogic phenomena
- Lithologic phenomena
  - Rock types
    - Igneous rock
      - Igneous formation processes
    - Sedimentary rock
      - Sedimentary formation processes (sedimentation)
      - Quicksand
    - Metamorphic rock
- Endogenic phenomena
  - Plate tectonics
    - Continental drift
    - Earthquake
    - Oceanic trench
  - Phenomena associated with igneous activity
    - Geysers and hot springs
    - Bradyseism
    - Volcanic eruption
  - Earth's magnetic field
- Exogenic phenomena
  - Slope phenomena
    - Slump
    - Landslide
  - Weathering phenomena
    - Erosion
  - Glacial and peri-glacial phenomena
    - Glaciation
    - Moraines
    - Hanging valleys
  - Atmospheric phenomena
  - Impact phenomena
    - Impact crater
- Coupled endogenic-exogenic phenomena
  - Orogeny
  - Drainage development
    - Stream capture

=== Gallery ===
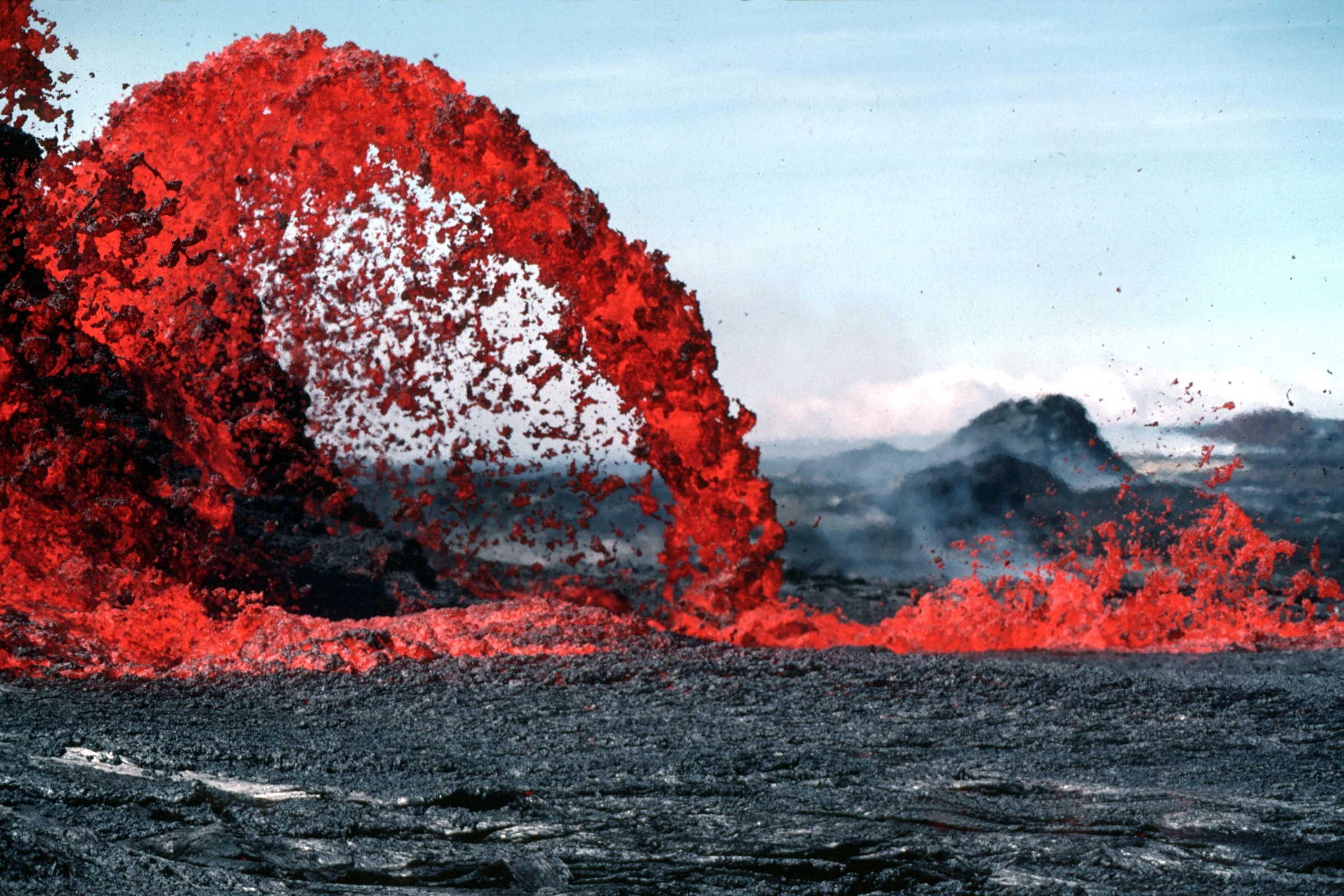
Geology: parabola-shaped lava flow illustrates Galileo's law of falling bodies, as well as blackbody radiation. The temperature can be discerned from the color of the blackbody.

== Meteorological phenomena ==
Violent meteorological phenomena are called storms. Regular, cyclical phenomena include seasons and atmospheric circulation. climate change is often semi-regular.

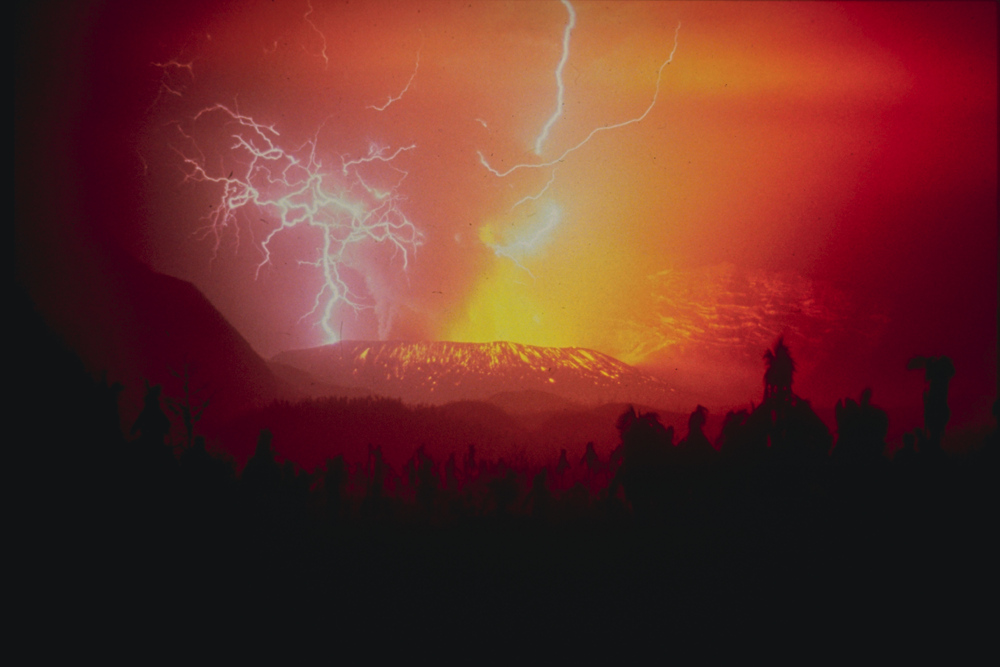
Lightning strikes during the eruption of the Galunggung volcano in 1982

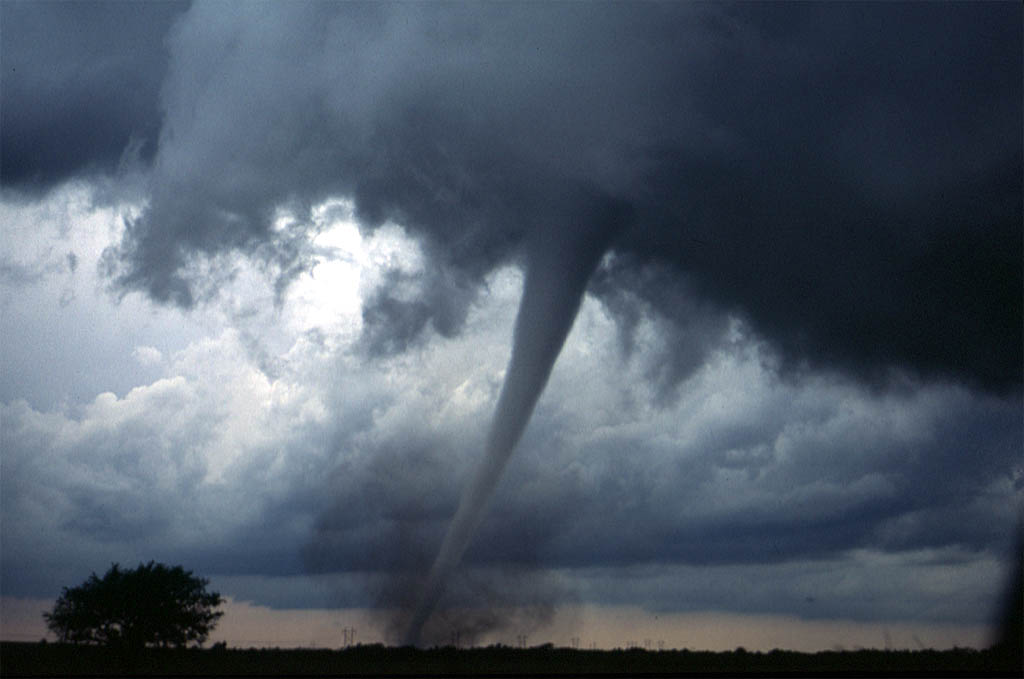
A tornado on May 3, 1999 in central Oklahoma

=== Atmospheric optical phenomena ===
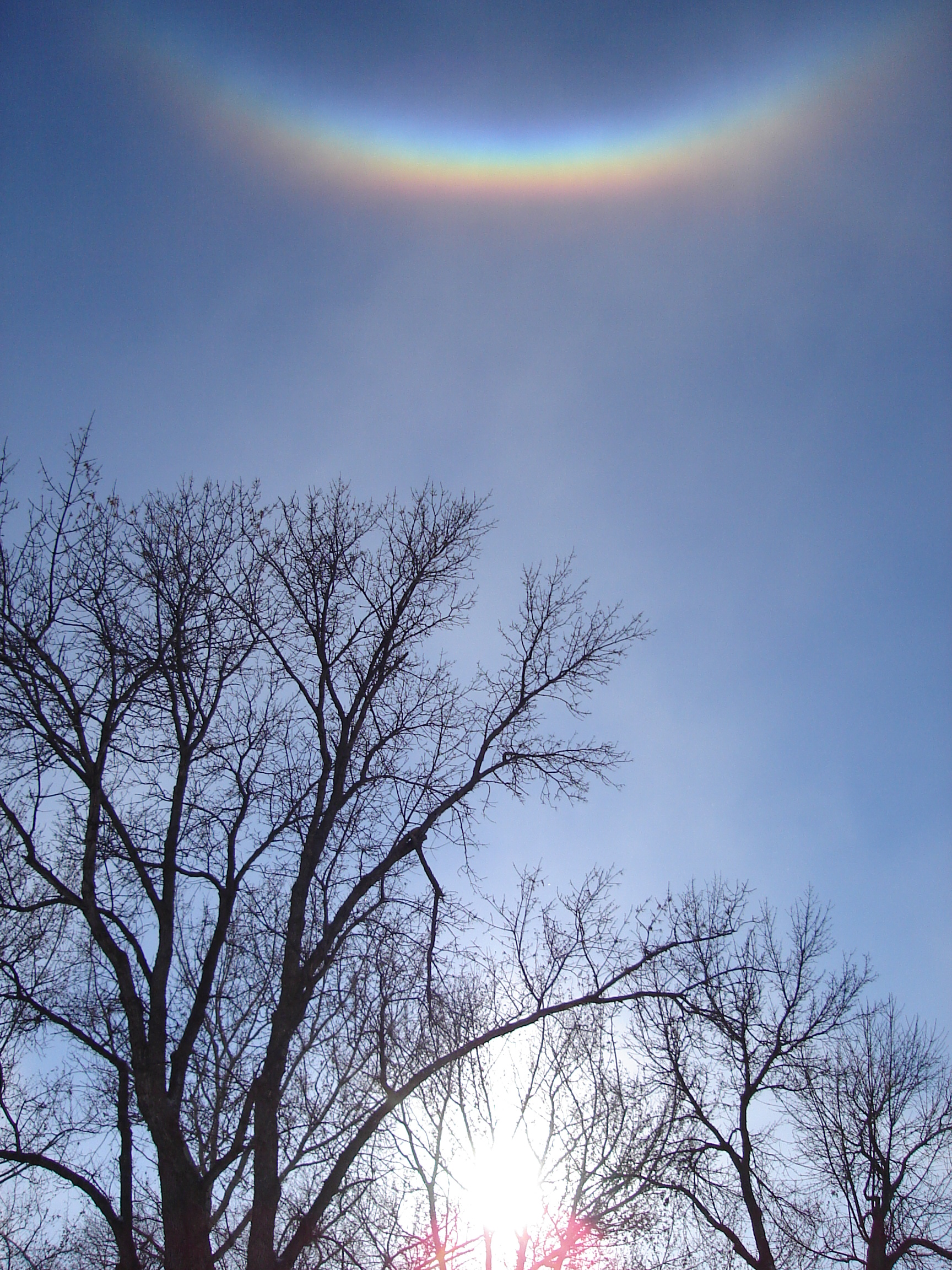
A circumzenithal arc over Grand Forks, North Dakota

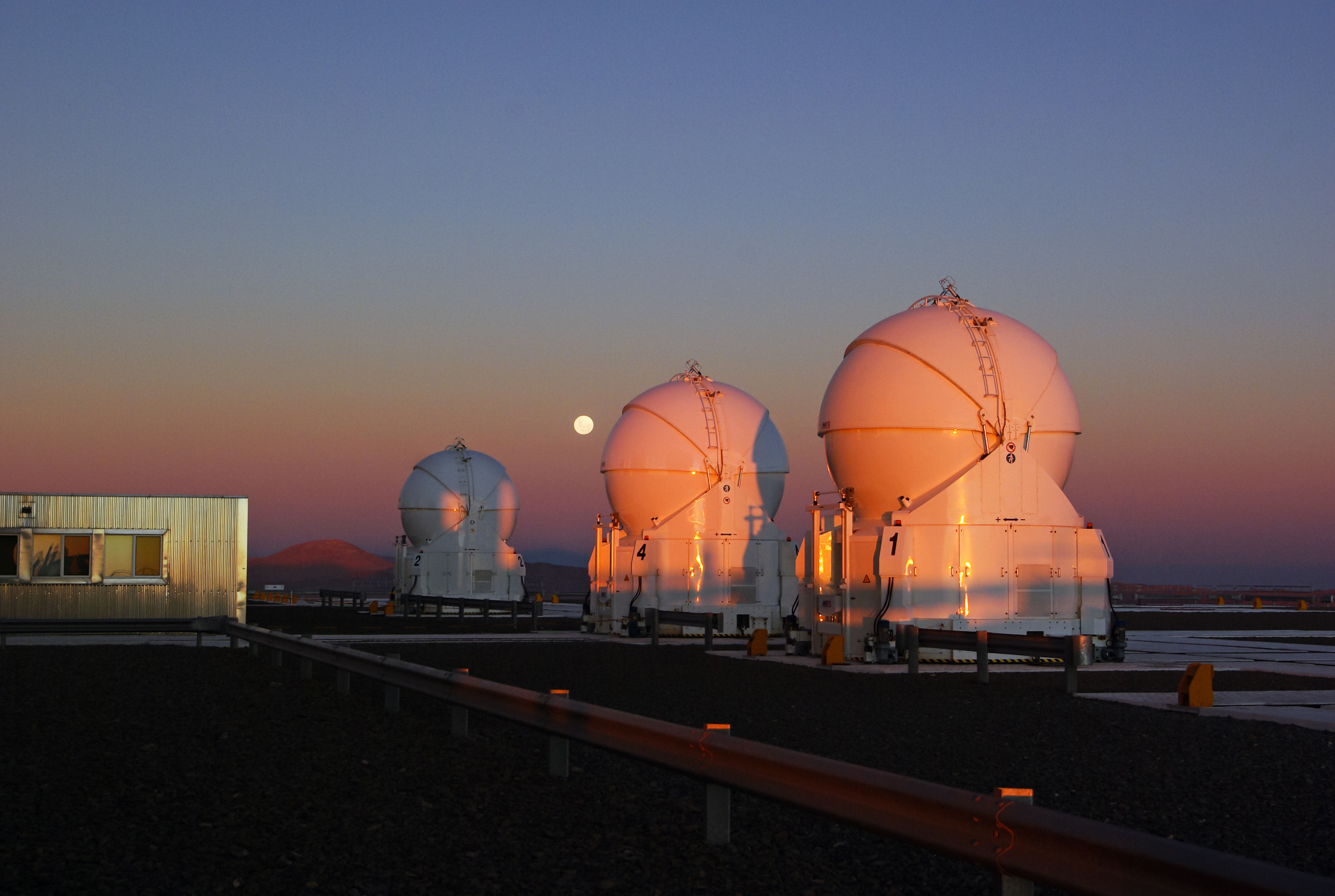
The Belt of Venus over Paranal Observatory atop Cerro Paranal in the Atacama Desert, northern Chile

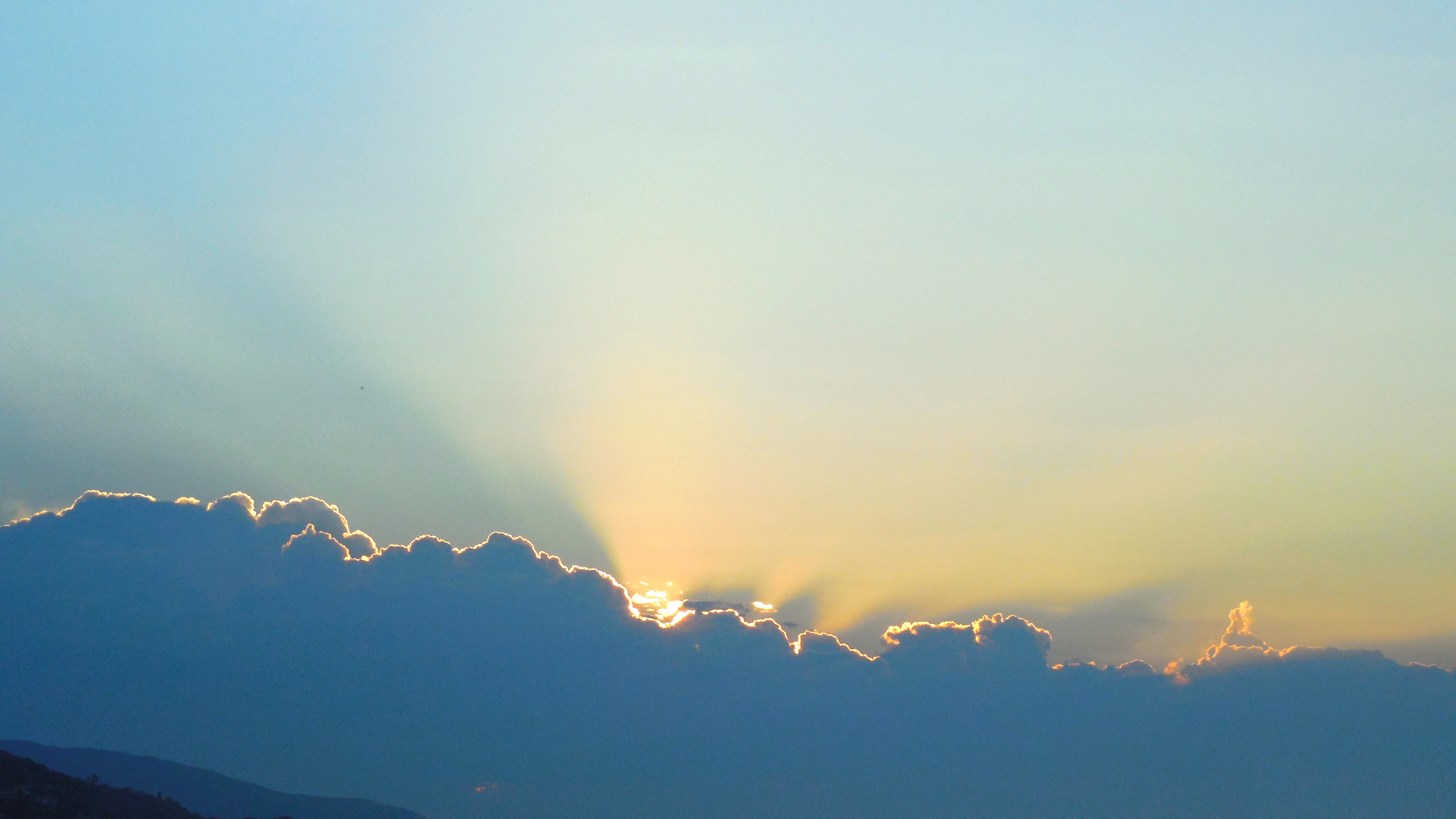
Crepuscular rays at sunrise in Malibu, California

Atmospheric optical phenomena include:

- Afterglow
- Airglow
- Alexander's band, the dark region between the two bows of a double rainbow.
- Alpenglow
- Anthelion
- Anticrepuscular rays
- Aurora (northern and southern lights, aurora borealis and aurora australis)
- Belt of Venus
- Brocken Spectre
- Circumhorizontal arc
- Circumzenithal arc
- Cloud iridescence
- Crepuscular rays
- Earth's shadow
- Earthquake lights
- Glories
- Green flash
- Halos, of Sun or Moon, including sun dogs
- Haze
- Heiligenschein or halo effect, partly caused by the opposition effect
- Ice blink
- Light pillar
- Lightning
- Mirages (including Fata Morgana)
- Monochrome Rainbow
- Moon dog
- Moonbow
- Nacreous cloud/Polar stratospheric cloud
- Rainbow
- Sprite (lightning)
- Subsun
- Sun dog
- Tangent arc
- Tyndall effect
- Upper-atmospheric lightning, including red sprites, Blue jets, and ELVES
- Water sky

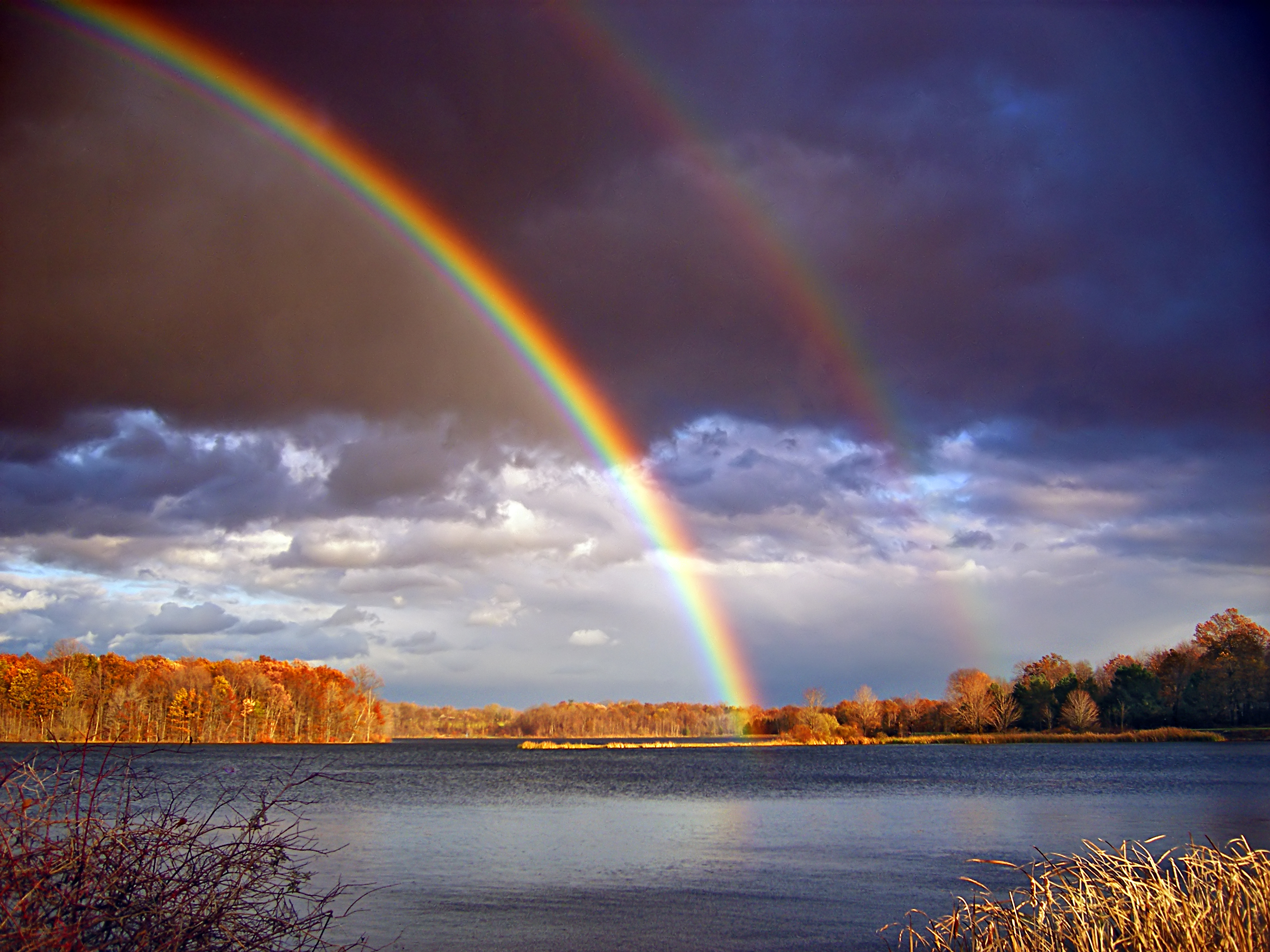
A double rainbow at Minsi Lake, Pennsylvania

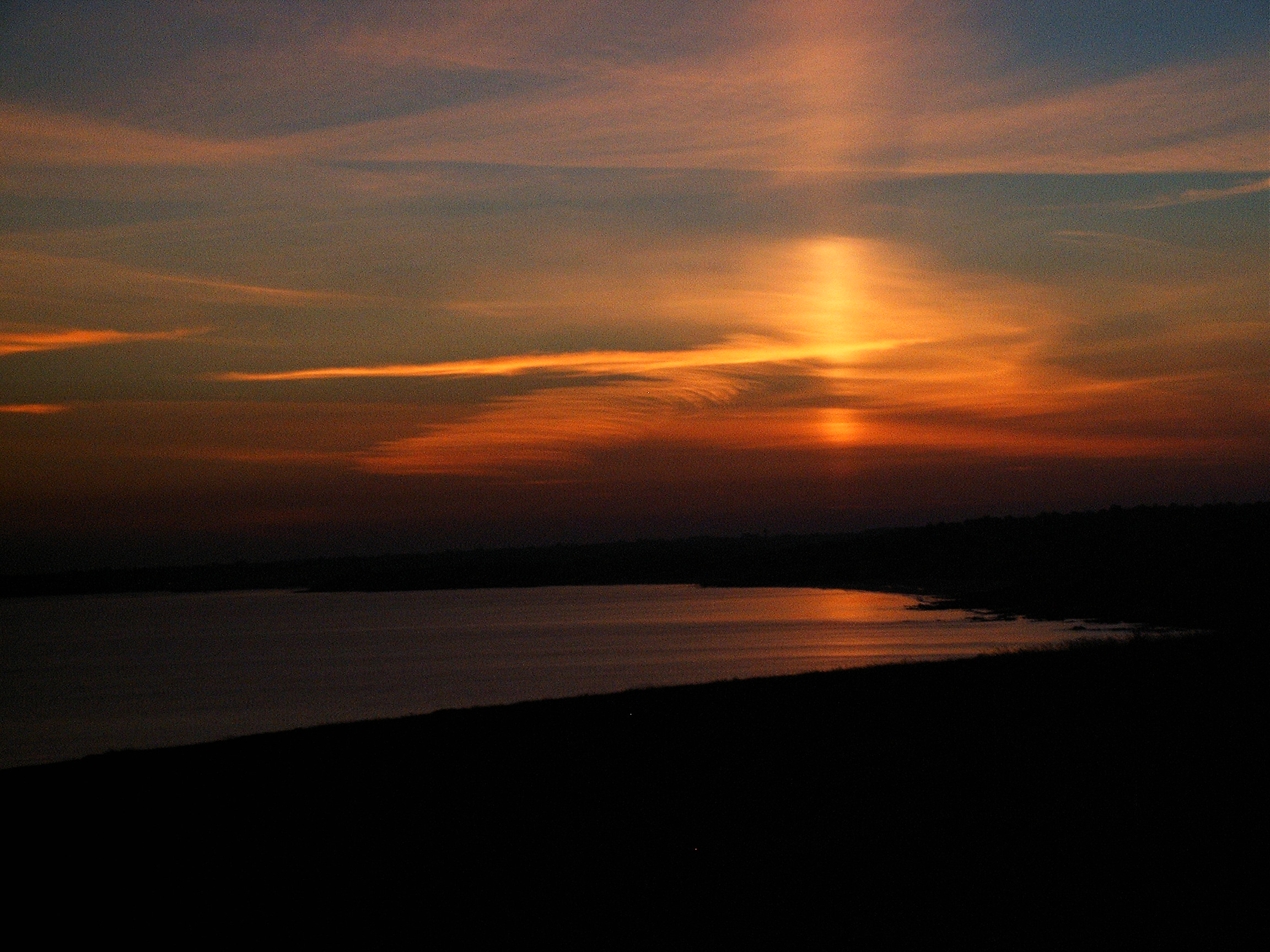
A sun pillar in Finistère, Brittany

Atmospheric optical phenomenon

=== Oceanographic ===
- Oceanographic phenomena include tsunamis, ocean currents and breaking waves.

==== Gallery ====
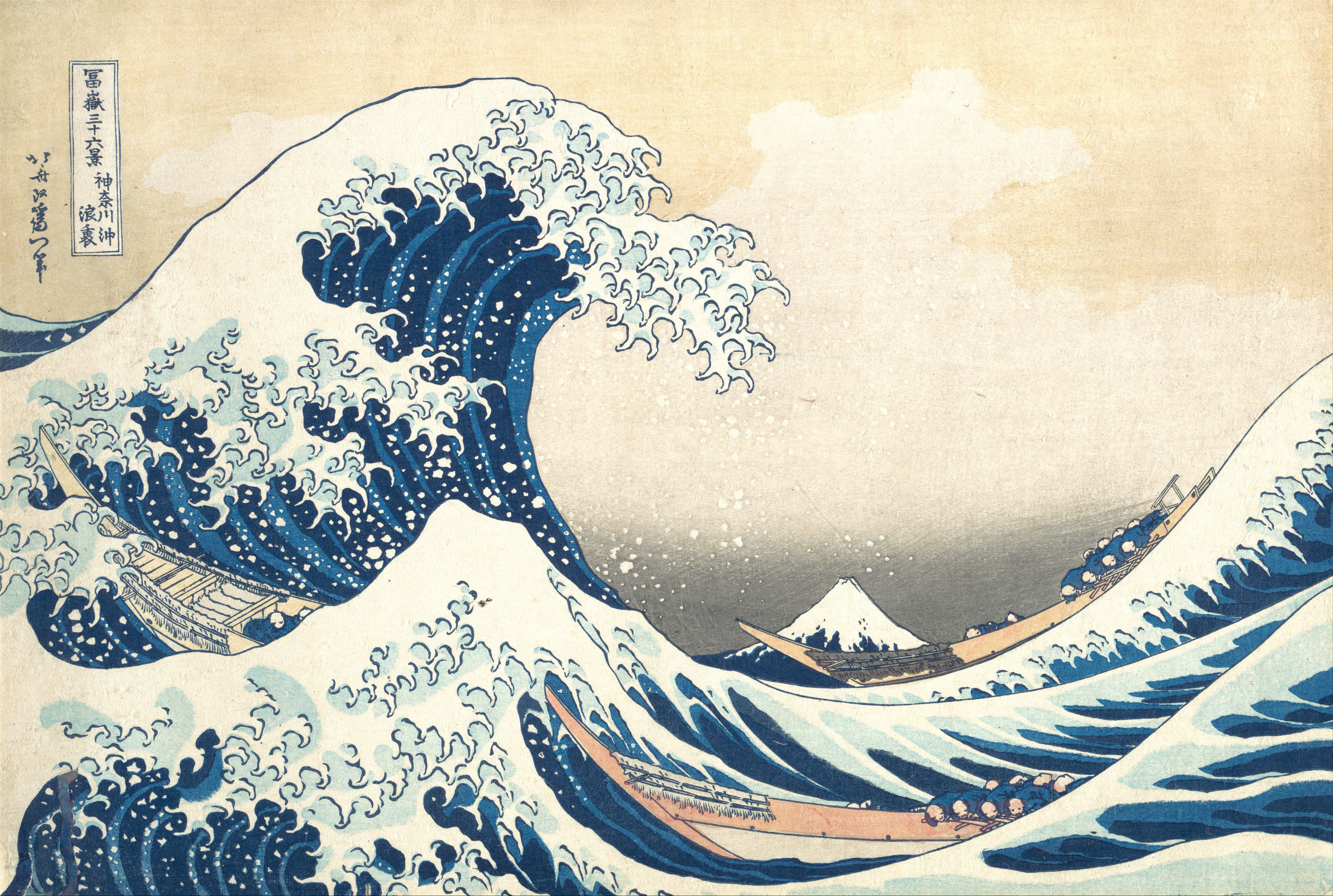
Tsunami by Hokusai 19th century

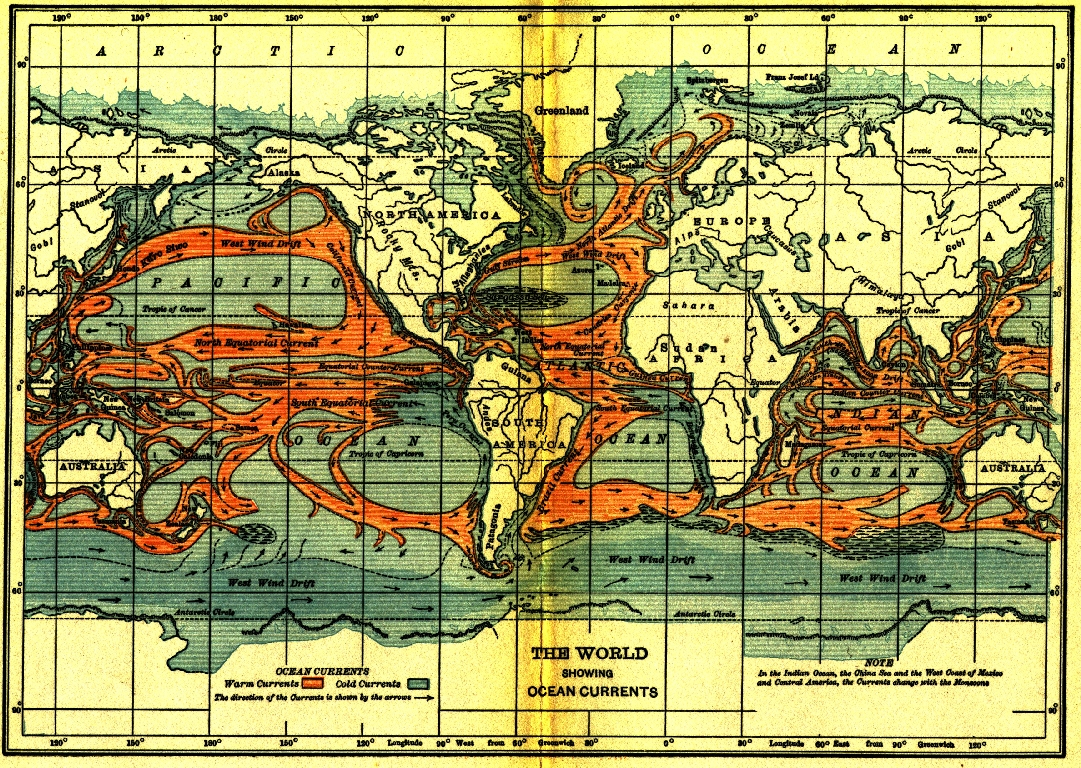
Source: "Physiography for High Schools" by Albert L. Arey, Frank L. Bryant, William W. Clendenin, and William T. Morrey. 1911, USA.

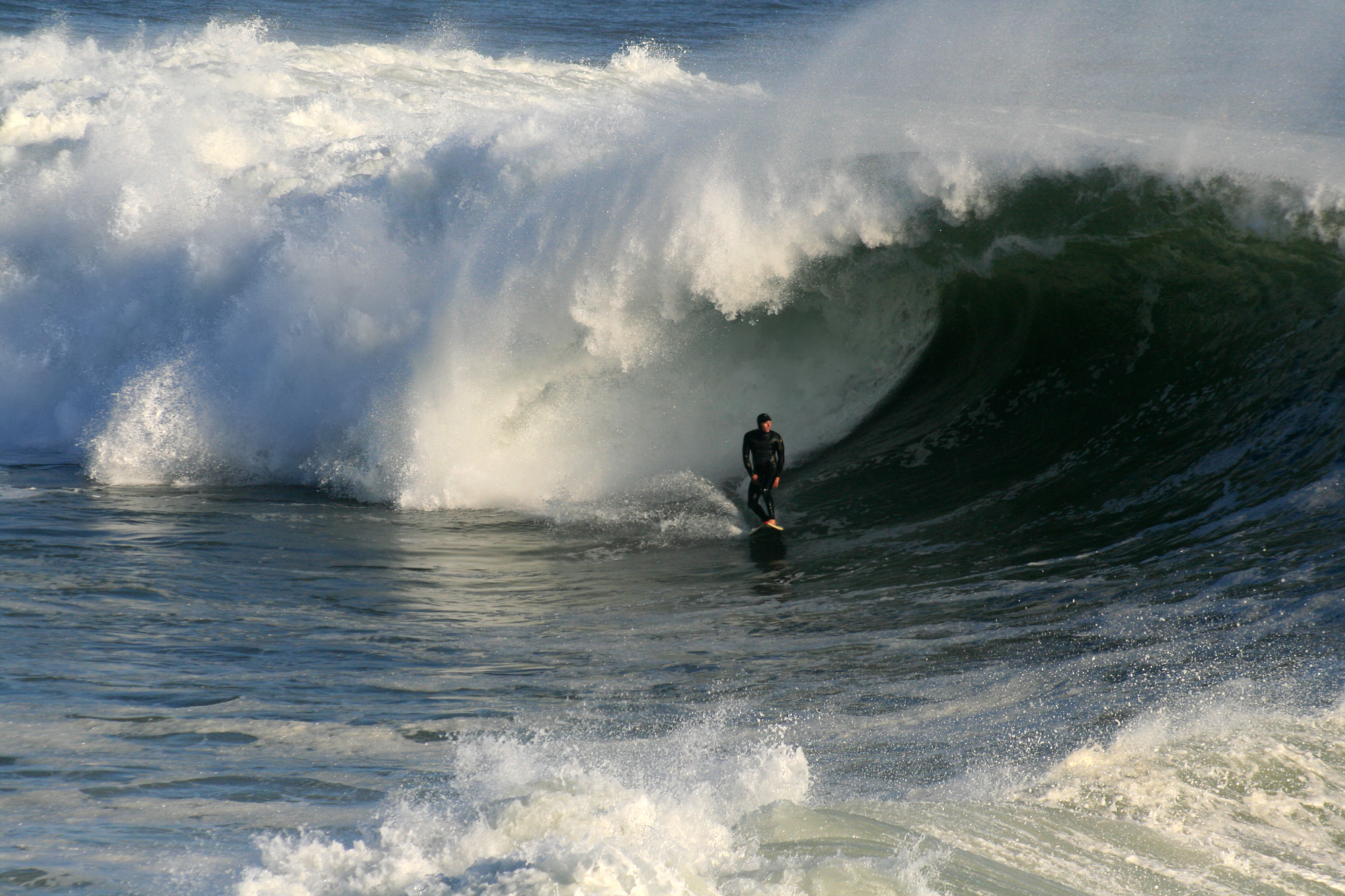
Shoreline wave-breaking (surf); Human riding surfboard.

== See also ==
- Act of God
- Electrical phenomena
- Materialism
- Midnight sun
- Black holes
- Natural environment
- Nature
- Transient lunar phenomenon
