= Laura Pisati =

Italian mathematician

Laura Pisati (1869/1870 - 30 March 1908) was an Italian mathematician. She was the first Italian to join the Deutsche Mathematiker-Vereinigung (DMV), in 1905, and in 1908 became the first woman invited to deliver a lecture at International Congress of Mathematicians (ICM).

Pisati was born in Ancona, and worked as a teacher at a secondary school for girls in Rome beginning in 1897. She graduated from Sapienza University of Rome in 1905. She died young a few days before the 1908 Congress in Rome, and a few days before her intended wedding to Italian physicist and electrical engineer Giovanni Giorgi, who had mentored her as a master's student. Her work for the Congress was titled "Saggio di una teoria sintetica delle funzioni di variabile complessa" ["An Essay on a Synthetic Theory of Functions of a Complex Variable"], and was presented by Roberto Marcolongo.

Her geometry textbook Elementi di geometria ad uso delle scuole medie inferiori, published in 1907, was part of a movement in Italian teaching of the time reacting against a presentation of the material focusing on intuition and hands-on experimentation, as had become popular beginning in the 1880s, and returning to a style of teaching geometry that included more rigorous proofs. In her preface, Pisati wrote that it would be a mistake to omit formal proofs and that it is not any more difficult to include this material.

== Writings ==
=== Articles ===
- Pisati, Laura (1905), "Sulla estensione del metodo di Laplace alle equazioni differenziali lineari di ordine qualunque con due variabili indipendenti", Rend. Circ. Matem. Palermo (in Italian), 20: 344–374, doi:10.1007/BF03014045, S2CID 124327707
- Pisati, Laura (1908), "Sulle corrispondenze funzionali non analitiche originate da integrali definiti", Rend. Circ. Matem. Palermo (in Italian), 25: 272–282, doi:10.1007/BF03029130, S2CID 122781020

=== Books ===
- L. Pisati (1907). Elementi di geometria ad uso delle scuole medie inferiori (in Italian). Paravia. ISBN 0-226-28863-3.
