= Micri- =

Obsolete metric unit prefix for 10^-14

Micri- (unit symbol mc-) is an archaic non-SI decimal metric prefix for 10^{−14}.

It was proposed as a prefix for the CGS-unit of energy, the erg. The micrierg was proposed in 1922 by William Draper Harkins as a unit of energy equating to 10^{−14} erg, the equivalent to 10^{−21} joule, as a convenient unit to measure the surface energy of molecules in surface chemistry. It saw limited use. One electronvolt is about 160 micriergs. In 1991, the micrierg was officially designated the zeptojoule when the zepto- prefix for 10^{−21} was officially adopted.

== See also ==
- Micron
