= Barye =

CGS unit of pressure

barye
- Unit system: Centimetre–gram–second system of units
- Unit of: Pressure
- Symbol: Ba
- Derivation: 1 Ba = 1 dyn/cm^{2}

Conversions
1 Ba in ...	... is equal to ...
- CGS base units: 1 cm^{−1}⋅g⋅s^{−2}
- SI units: 0.1 Pa
- English Engineering units: 1.450377×10^{−5} psi

The barye (symbol: Ba), or sometimes barad, barrie, bary, baryd, baryed, or barie, is the centimetre–gram–second (CGS) unit of pressure. It is defined as 1 dyne per square centimetre and is equal to 1 microbar. It has also historically been written as "bar", which conflicts with bar.

1 Ba = 0.1 Pa = 10^{−6} bar = 10^{−4} pieze = 0.1 N/m^{2} = 1 g⋅cm^{−1}⋅s^{−2}

A barye is also equivalent to 1,000 millibarye or 0.001 kilobarye.

== See also ==
- Pascal (unit)
- International System of Units
