= Metre–tonne–second system of units =

Variant of the metric system

The metre–tonne–second (MTS) system of units was invented in France (hence the derived unit names sthène and pièze) where it became the legal system between 1919 and 1961. It was adopted by the Soviet Union in 1933 and abolished there in 1955. It was a coherent metric system of units, much as SI (itself a refinement of the MKS system) and the centimetre–gram–second system (CGS), but with larger units for industrial use, whereas the CGS system was regarded as only really suitable for laboratory use.

== Units ==
The base units of the MTS system are:

- Length: metre
- Mass: tonne,
  1 t = 10^{3} kg = 1 Mg
- Time: second

Some common derived units:

- Volume: cubic metre or stere
  1 m^{3} ≡ 1 st
- Force: sthène,
  1 sn = 1 t⋅m/s^{2} = 10^{3} N = 1 kN
- Energy: sthène-metre = kilojoule,
  1 sn⋅m = 1 t⋅m^{2}/s^{2} = 10^{3} J = 1 kJ
- Power: sthène-metre per second = kilowatt,
  1 sn⋅m/s = 1 t⋅m^{2}/s^{3} = 10^{3} W = 1 kW
- Pressure: pièze,
  1 pz = 1 t/m⋅s^{2} = 10^{3} Pa = 1 kPa = 1 cbar (centibar)

== See also ==
- Foot–pound–second system of units (FPS)
- List of metric units
- Metre–kilogram–second system of units (MKS)
