= Tonne =

Metric unit of mass equivalent to 1,000 kilograms or 1 megagram

tonne megagram
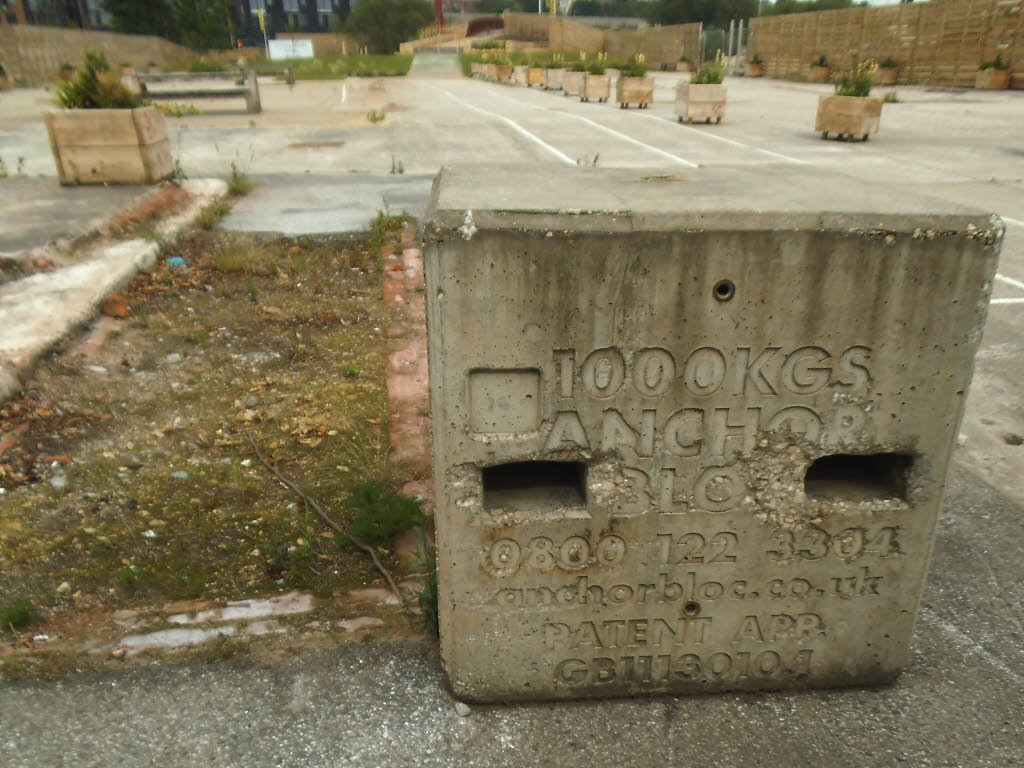
- A one-tonne (1000-kilogram) concrete block in Leeds, UK

General information
- Unit system: Non-SI
- Unit of: mass
- Symbol: t Mg
- In SI units: 1000 kg

The tonne (/tʌn/ or /tɒn/; symbol: t) is a unit of mass equal to 1,000 kilograms. It is also referred to as a metric ton in the United States to distinguish it from the non-metric units of the short ton and the long ton. One tonne is equivalent to approximately 2,204.6 pounds, 1.102 short tons, and 0.984 long tons. The exact corresponding SI unit is the megagram (symbol Mg), a less common way to express the same mass.

== Symbol and abbreviations ==
The BIPM symbol for the tonne is t, adopted at the same time as the unit in 1879. Its use is also official for the metric ton in the United States, having been adopted by the United States National Institute of Standards and Technology (NIST). It is a symbol, not an abbreviation, and should not be followed by a period. Use of lower case is significant, and use of other letter combinations can lead to ambiguity. For example, T, MT, mT, are the SI symbols for the tesla, megatesla, and millitesla, respectively, while Mt and mt are SI-compatible symbols for the megatonne (one teragram) and millitonne (one kilogram). If describing TNT equivalent units of energy, one megatonne of TNT is equivalent to approximately 4.184 petajoules.

== Origin and spelling ==
In English, tonne is an established spelling alternative to metric ton. In American English and British English, tonne is usually pronounced the same as ton (/tʌn/), but the final "e" can also be pronounced, i.e. "tunnie" (/ˈtʌni/). In Australian English, the common and recommended pronunciation is /tɒn/. In the United States, metric ton is the name for this unit used and recommended by NIST; an unqualified mention of a ton typically refers to a short ton of 2000 lb (907.2 kg) and to a lesser extent to a long ton of 2240 lb (1016 kg), with the term tonne rarely used in speech or writing. Both terms are acceptable in Canadian English.

Ton and tonne are both derived from a Germanic word in general use in the North Sea area since the Middle Ages (cf. Old English and Old Frisian tunne, Old High German and Medieval Latin tunna, German and French tonne) to designate a large cask, or tun. A full tun, standing about a metre high, could easily weigh a tonne. See also the common German word Mülltonne (lit. 'garbage drum').

The spelling tonne pre-dates the introduction of the SI in 1960; it has been used with this meaning in France since 1842, when there were no metric prefixes for multiples of 10^{6} and above, and is now used as the standard spelling for the metric mass measurement in most English-speaking countries. In the United States, the unit was originally referred to using the French words millier or tonneau, but these terms are now obsolete. The British imperial and United States customary units are comparable to the tonne and the spelling of ton in English is the same, though they differ in mass.

=== French pre-metric tonne ===
Prior to metrification the French tonne consisted of 2000 French pounds (livres). Therefore a French tonne of that era weighed 979 kg compared to an English ton of 1016 kg. Prior to the use of tonne for this weight tonneau (plural: tonneaux) was used.

== Conversions ==
One tonne is equivalent to:

- 1000 kilograms (kg) by definition.
- 1000000 grams (g) or 1 megagram (Mg). Megagram is the corresponding official SI unit with the same mass; it is rarely used, in part because the base SI unit of mass is the kilogram, not the gram. Mg is distinct from mg, milligram.
- 1000/0.45359237 pounds (lb), by definition of the pound, or approximately 2204.622622 lb.
- 1/(0.907 184 74) short tons (tn), exactly, or approximately 1.102311311 tn.
  - One short ton is exactly 0.90718474 t.
- 1/1.0160469088 long tons (LT), exactly, or approximately 0.9842065276 LT.
  - One long ton is exactly 1.0160469088 t.

A tonne is the mass of one cubic metre of pure water at 4 °C (39 °F). (Note: To within 0.003%.)

== Derived units ==
As a non-SI unit, the use of SI metric prefixes with the tonne does not fall within the SI standard. For multiples of the tonne, it is more usual to speak of thousands or millions of tonnes. Kilotonne, megatonne, and gigatonne are more usually used for the energy of nuclear explosions and other events in equivalent mass of TNT, often loosely as approximate figures. When used in this context, there is little need to distinguish between metric and other tons, and the unit is spelled either as ton or tonne with the relevant prefix attached. (Note: The Oxford English Dictionary 2nd ed. gives both megaton and megatonne and adds "The unit may be calculated in either imperial or metric tons; the form megatonne generally implies the metric unit". The use for energy is the first definition; use for mass or weight is the third definition.)

Tonnes		Grams		Equivalents (Note: The equivalent units columns use the short scale large-number naming system currently used in most English-language countries, e.g. 1 billion = 1000 million = 1000000000.)		
Name	Symbol	Name	Symbol	Tonnes (t)	Short Tons (tn) (Note: Values in the equivalent short and long tons columns are rounded to five significant figures. See § Conversions for exact values.)	Long Tons (LT)
tonne	t	megagram	Mg	1 t	1.1023 tn	0.98421 LT
kilotonne	kt (Note: Though non-standard, the symbol "kt" is also used (instead of the standard symbol "kn") for knot, a unit of speed for aircraft and watercraft. The standard meaning of the symbol kt is for kilotonne.)	gigagram	Gg	1000 t	1102.3 tn	984.21 LT
megatonne	Mt	teragram	Tg	1000000 t	1.1023 million tn	984210 LT
gigatonne	Gt	petagram	Pg	1000000000 t	1.1023 billion tn	984.21 million LT

== Alternative usages ==
=== Metric ton units ===
A metric ton unit (mtu) can mean 10 kg (22 lb) within metal trading, particularly within the United States. It traditionally referred to a metric ton of ore containing 1% (i.e. 10 kg) of metal. The following excerpt from a mining geology textbook describes its usage in the particular case of tungsten:

Tungsten concentrates are usually traded in metric tonne units (originally designating one tonne of ore containing 1% of WO_{3}, today used to measure WO_{3} quantities in 10 kg units. One metric tonne unit (mtu) of tungsten (VI) contains 7.93 kilograms of tungsten.

— Walter L Pohl, Economic Geology: Principles and Practices, English edition, 2011, p. 183.

In the case of uranium, MTU is sometimes used in the sense of metric ton of uranium (1000 kg [2200 lb]).

=== Use of mass as proxy for energy ===
The tonne of trinitrotoluene (TNT) is used as a proxy for energy, usually of explosions (TNT is a common high explosive). Prefixes are used: kiloton(ne), megaton(ne), gigaton(ne), especially for expressing nuclear weapon yield, based on a specific combustion energy of TNT of about 4.2 MJ/kg (or one thermochemical calorie per milligram). Hence, 1 t TNT = approx. 4.2 GJ, 1 kt TNT = approx. 4.2 TJ, 1 Mt TNT = approx. 4.2 PJ.

The SI unit of energy is the joule. One tonne of TNT is approximately equivalent to 4.2 gigajoules.

In the petroleum industry, the tonne of oil equivalent (toe) is a unit of energy: the amount of energy released by burning one tonne of crude oil, approximately 42 GJ. There are several slightly different definitions. This is ten times as much as a tonne of TNT because atmospheric oxygen is used.

=== Unit of force ===
Like the gram and the kilogram, the tonne gave rise to a (now obsolete) force unit of the same name, the tonne-force, equivalent to about 9.8 kilonewtons. The unit was also often called simply "tonne" or "metric ton" without identifying it as a unit of force.

== See also ==
- Metre–tonne–second system of units
- Orders of magnitude (mass)
- Ton
  - Tonnage
  - Ton (volume)

== Notes and references ==
Notes

Citations
