= MKS units =

Measurement system based on metre, kilogram, and second

The metre, kilogram, second system of units, also known more briefly as MKS units or the MKS system, is a physical system of measurement based on the metre, kilogram, and second (MKS) as base units. Distances are described in terms of metres, mass in terms of kilograms and time in seconds. Derived units are defined using the appropriate combinations, such as velocity in metres per second. Some units have their own names, such as the newton unit of force which is defined as kilogram times metres per second squared.

The modern International System of Units (SI, from the French name Système international d'unités) was originally created as a formalization of the MKS system. The SI has been redefined several times since then and is now based entirely on fundamental physical constants, but still closely approximates the original MKS units for most practical purposes.

== History ==
By the mid-19th century, there was a demand by scientists to define a coherent system of units. A coherent system of units is one where all units are directly derived from a set of base units, without the need of any conversion factors. The United States customary units are an example of a non-coherent set of units. In 1874, the British Association for the Advancement of Science (BAAS) introduced the CGS system, a coherent system based on the centimetre, gram and second. These units were inconvenient for electromagnetic applications, since electromagnetic units derived from these did not correspond to the commonly used practical units, such as the volt, ampere and ohm. After the Metre Convention of 1875, work started on international prototypes for the kilogram and the metre, which were formally sanctioned by the General Conference on Weights and Measures (CGPM) in 1889, thus formalizing the MKS system by using the kilogram and metre as base units.

In 1901, Giovanni Giorgi proposed to the Associazione elettrotecnica italiana (AEI) that the MKS system, extended with a fourth unit to be taken from the practical units of electromagnetism, such as the volt, ohm or ampere, be used to create a coherent system using practical units. This system was strongly promoted by electrical engineer George A. Campbell. The CGS and MKS systems were both widely used in the 20th century, with the MKS system being primarily used in practical areas, such as commerce and engineering. The International Electrotechnical Commission (IEC) adopted Giorgi's proposal as the M.K.S. System of Giorgi in 1935 without specifying which electromagnetic unit would be the fourth base unit. In 1939, the Consultative Committee for Electricity (CCE) recommended the adoption of Giorgi's proposal, using the ampere as the fourth base unit. This was subsequently approved by the CGPM in 1954.

The rmks system (rationalized metre–kilogram–second) combines MKS with rationalization of electromagnetic equations.

The MKS units with the ampere as a fourth base unit is sometimes referred to as the MKSA system. This system was extended by adding the kelvin and candela as base units in 1960, thus forming the International System of Units. The mole was added as a seventh base unit in 1971.

== Derived units ==
=== Mechanical units ===
Named MKS mechanical derived units
Quantity	Quantity symbol	Unit	Unit symbol	MKS equivalent
frequency	f	hertz	Hz	s^{−1}
force	F	newton	N	kg⋅m⋅s^{−2}
pressure	p	pascal	Pa	kg⋅m^{−1}⋅s^{−2}
energy	E	joule	J	kg⋅m^{2}⋅s^{−2}
power	P	watt	W	kg⋅m^{2}⋅s^{−3}

=== Electromagnetic units ===
Named MKSA electromagnetic derived units
Quantity	Quantity symbol	Unit	Unit symbol	MKSA equivalent
electric charge	Q	coulomb	C	s⋅A
voltage	U	volt	V	kg⋅m^{2}⋅s^{−3}⋅A^{−1}
electric capacitance	C	farad	F	kg^{−1}⋅m^{−2}⋅s^{4}⋅A^{2}
electric resistance	R	ohm	Ω	kg⋅m^{2}⋅s^{−3}⋅A^{−2}
electric conductance	G	siemens	S	kg^{−1}⋅m^{−2}⋅s^{3}⋅A^{2}
magnetic flux	Φ_{B}	weber	Wb	kg⋅m^{2}⋅s^{−2}⋅A^{−1}
magnetic flux density	B	tesla	T	kg⋅s^{−2}⋅A^{−1}
electric inductance	L	henry	H	kg⋅m^{2}⋅s^{−2}⋅A^{−2}

== See also ==
- Centimetre–gram–second system of units (CGS)
- Foot–pound–second system (FPS)
- List of metric units
- Metre–tonne–second system of units (MTS)
- Vacuum permeability § Systems of units and historical origin of value of μ_{0}
- Vacuum permittivity § Rationalization of units
