= Iceblink =

White light caused by reflection of an ice field

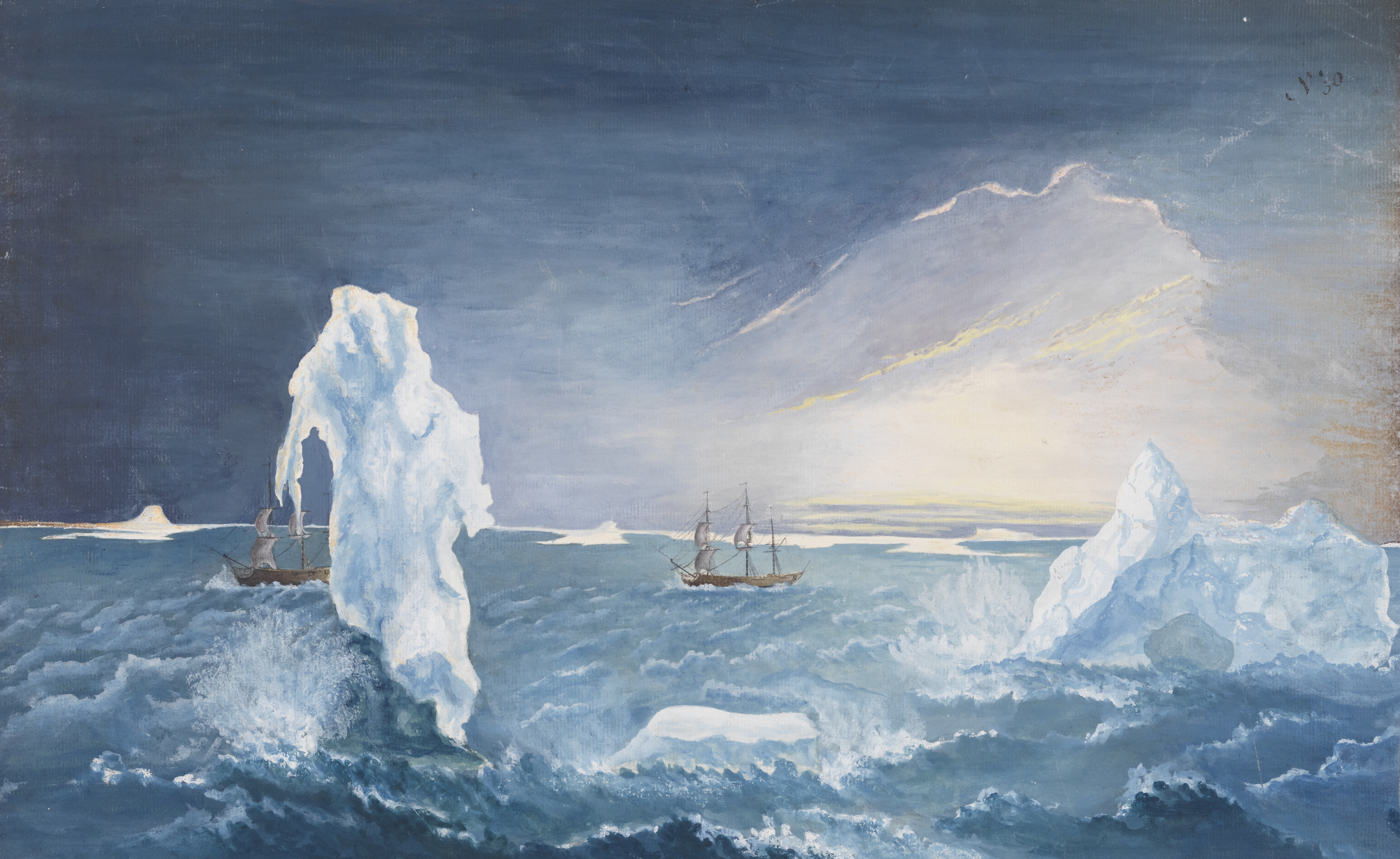
Ice Islands with ice blink, watercolour by Georg Forster, made 1773 during the second voyage of James Cook

Iceblink is a white light seen near the horizon, especially on the underside of low clouds, resulting from reflection of light off an ice field immediately beyond. The iceblink was used by both Inuit and explorers looking for the Northwest Passage to help them navigate safely as it indicates ice beyond the horizon. Its inverse phenomenon is water sky. The iceblink can be observed in both polar regions, being observed by Inuit in the Arctic and by many expeditions to Antarctica, including both the James Ross and Terra Nova expeditions.

Appearances of iceblink have been misinterpreted by navigators as mountains. John Ross made this error when searching for the Northwest Passage in 1818. Whilst in the Lancaster Sound, he misidentified iceblink as a new "mountain range" that he named the Croker Mountains, with the ensuing disagreements with his officers and the wider controversy costing him much of his reputation.

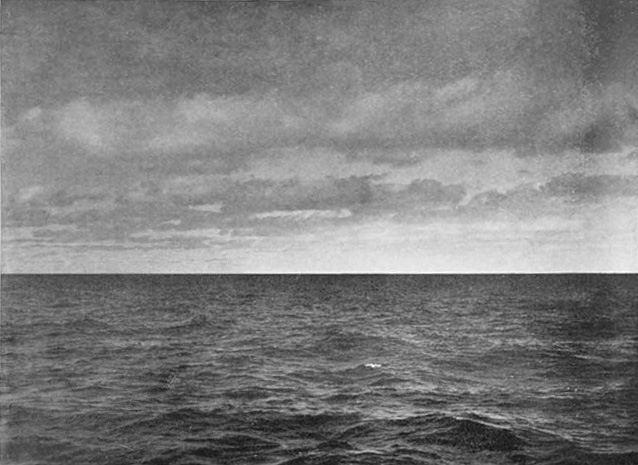
Ice blink captured by Herbert Ponting in 1913
