= Pièze =

pièze
- Unit system: Metre–tonne–second system of units
- Unit of: Pressure
- Symbol: pz
- Derivation: 1 pz = 1 sn/m^{2}

Conversions
| 1 pz in ... | ... is equal to ... |
- MTS base units: m^{−1}⋅t⋅s^{−2}
- SI units: 1 kPa
- English Engineering Units: 0.1450377 psi

The pièze (French: [pjɛz]) is the unit of pressure in the metre–tonne–second system of units (mts system), used, e.g., in the former Soviet Union 1933–1955. It is defined as one sthène per square metre. The symbol is pz.

| one pièze | = | 1 | kilopascal |
| one pièze | = | 10 | millibars |
| one pièze | ≈ | 9.869×10^{−3} | standard atmospheres |
| one pièze | ≈ | 7.501 | torrs |
| one pièze | ≈ | 0.1450 | pounds per square inch |
| one pièze | ≈ | 0.2953 | inches of mercury |
