= Water sky =

Atmospheric optical phenomenon

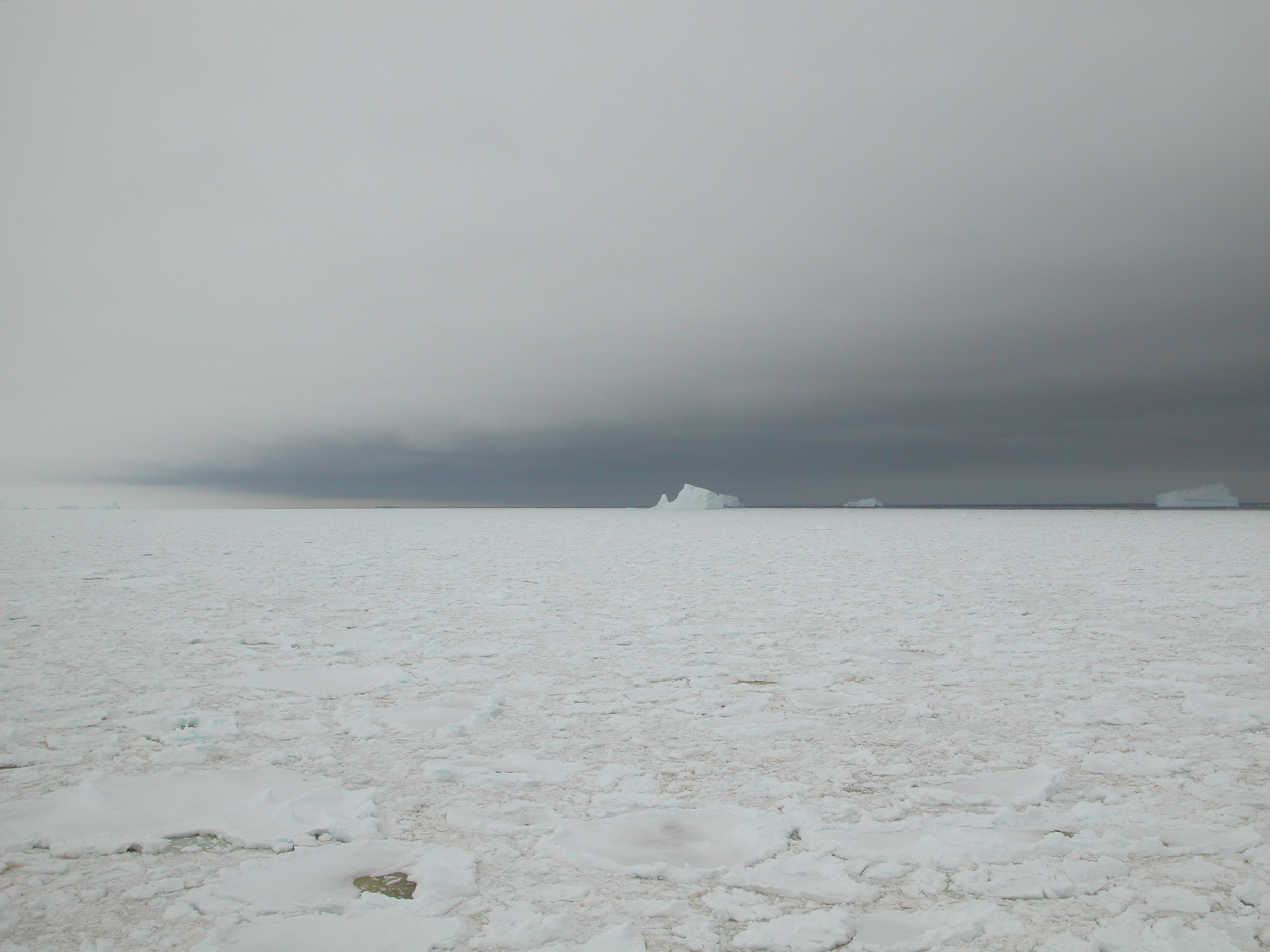
Water Sky

Water sky is a phenomenon that is closely related to ice blink. It forms in regions with large areas of ice and low-lying clouds and so is limited mostly to the extreme northern and southern sections of earth, in Antarctica and in the Arctic.

When light hits the blue oceans or seas, some of it bounces back and enables the observer to physically see the water. However, some of the light also is reflected back up onto the bottoms of low-lying clouds and causes a dark spot to appear underneath some clouds. These clouds may be visible when the seas are not and can show alert and knowledgeable travelers the general direction of water. The dark clouds over open water have long been used by polar explorers and scientists to navigate in sea ice. Measurable and human-detectable differences in the angle of polarization and thus the optical appearance of water sky have been demonstrated. Arctic explorer Fridtjof Nansen and his assistant Hjalmar Johansen used the phenomenon to find lanes of water in their failed expedition to the North Pole, as did Louis Bernacchi and Douglas Mawson in Antarctica.
