= Giovanni Giorgi =

Italian physicist and engineer (1871–1950)

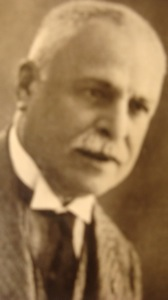
- Giorgi in 1939
- Born: 27 November 1871; Lucca, Kingdom of Italy
- Died: 19 August 1950 (aged 78); Castiglioncello, Livorno, Italy
- Engineering career
- Institutions: University of Rome
- Projects: Giorgi system of measurement

Giovanni Giorgi (November 27, 1871 – August 19, 1950) was an Italian physicist and electrical engineer who proposed the Giorgi system of measurement, the precursor to the International System of Units (SI).

== Early life ==
Giovanni Giorgi was born in Lucca on November 27, 1871.

== Career ==
Giorgi studied engineering at the Institute of Technology of Rome, he worked at Fornaci Giorgi in Ferentino, then was the director of the Technology Office of Rome between 1905 and 1924. He also taught at the University of Rome between 1913 and 1939. During World War II he moved to Ferentino. He was an Invited Speaker of the ICM in 1924 in Toronto, in 1928 in Bologna, and in 1932 in Zurich.

== Personal life ==
He was engaged to Laura Pisati, his former master's student who became the first woman invited to deliver a lecture at the fourth International Congress of Mathematicians (ICM), but she died in 1908 shortly before both her talk and their intended wedding.

== Death ==
Giorgi died on August 19, 1950, in Castiglioncello, Livorno at the age of 78.

== The Giorgi system ==
Toward the end of the 19th century, after James Clerk Maxwell's discoveries, it was clear that electric measurements could not be explained in terms of the three base units of length, mass and time, and that some irrational coefficients appeared in the equations without any logical physical reason. In 1901, Giorgi proposed to the Associazione elettrotecnica italiana (AEI) that the MKS system (which used the metre, kilogram and second as its base units) should be extended with a fourth unit to be chosen from the units of electromagnetism, solving also the presence of the irrational coefficients.

In 1935 this was adopted by the International Electrotechnical Commission (IEC) as the M.K.S. System of Giorgi without specifying which electromagnetic unit would be the fourth base unit. In 1946 the International Committee for Weights and Measures (CIPM) approved a proposal to use the ampere as that unit in a four-dimensional system, the MKSA system.

The Giorgi system was thus the precursor of the International System of Units (SI) adopted in 1960, which was based on six base units: metre, kilogram, second, ampere, kelvin, and candela. The mole was added as a seventh base unit in 1971.

== Works ==
- Compendio delle lezioni di meccanica razionale (in Italian). Roma: Sampaolesi. 1928.
- Lezioni di fisica matematica (in Italian). Roma: Sampaolesi. 1928.
