= Sthène =

Obsolete unit of force; same as 1 kilonewton

sthène
- Unit system: Metre–tonne–second system of units
- Unit of: Force
- Symbol: sn

Conversions
1 sn in ...	... is equal to ...
- MTS base units: 1 t⋅m/s^{2}
- SI units: 1 kN
- British Gravitational System: 224.8089 lbf

The sthène (French: [stɛn]; symbol sn), sometimes spelled (or misspelled) sthéne or sthene (from Ancient Greek: σθένος, romanized: sthénos, lit. 'force'), is an obsolete unit of force or thrust in the metre–tonne–second system of units (MTS) introduced in France in 1919. When proposed by the British Association in 1876, it was called the funal, but the name was changed by 1914. The MTS system was abandoned in favour of the MKS system and has now been superseded by the International System of Units.

1 sthène	= 1 kilonewton
1 sthène	≈ 101.9716 kilograms-force
1 sthène	≈ 224.8089 pounds-force
1 sthène	≈ 7,233.014 poundals
