= Pascal (unit) =

SI derived unit of pressure

pascal
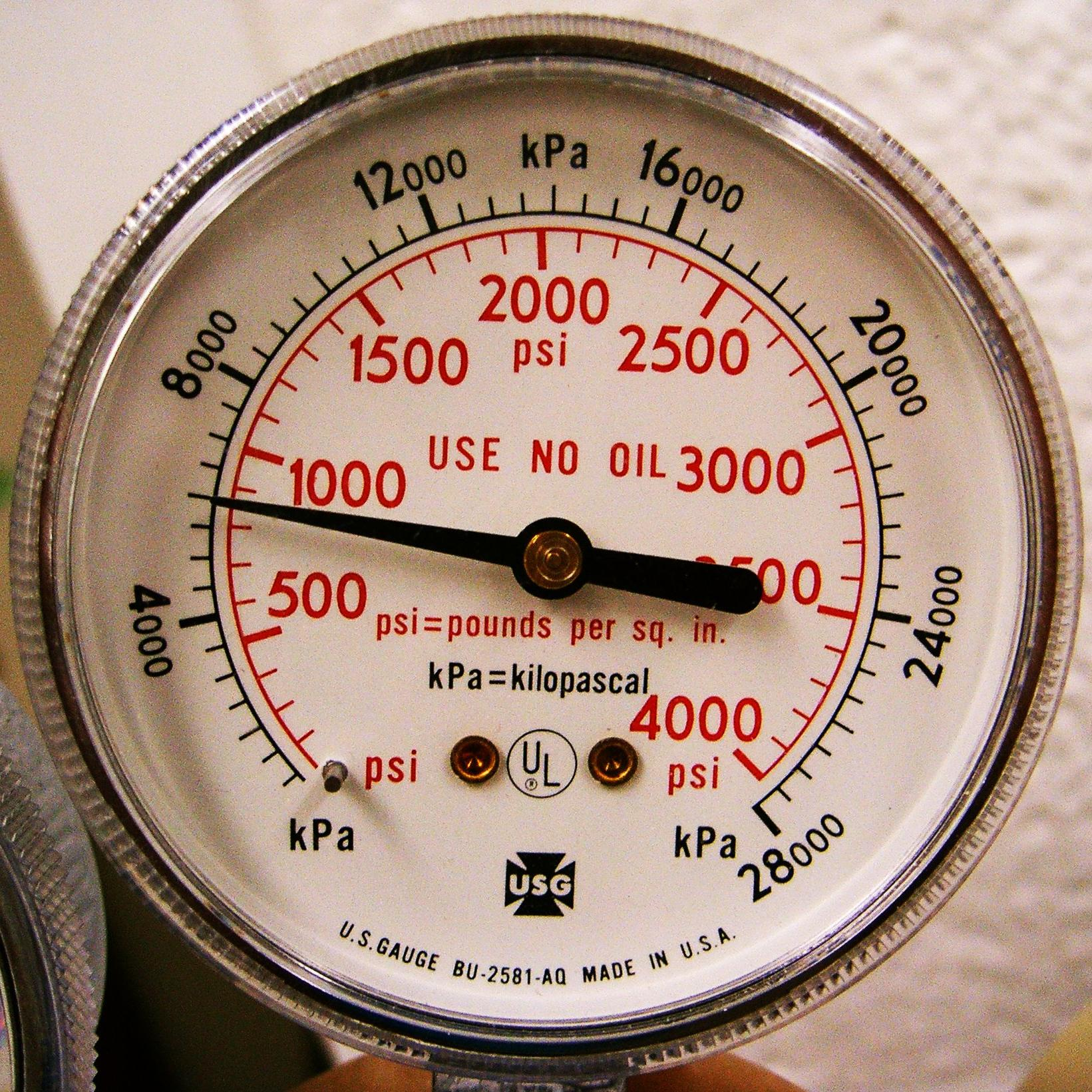
- A pressure gauge reading in psi (red scale) and kPa (black scale)

General information
- Unit system: SI
- Unit of: pressure or stress
- Symbol: Pa
- Named after: Blaise Pascal

Conversions
| 1 Pa in ... | ... is equal to ... |
- SI base units: kg⋅m^{−1}⋅s^{−2}
- US customary units: 1.45038×10^{−4} psi
- atmosphere: 9.86923×10^{−6} atm
- bar: 10^{−5} bar
- barye (CGS unit): 10 Ba

The pascal (symbol: Pa) is the unit of pressure in the International System of Units (SI). It is also used to quantify internal pressure, stress, Young's modulus, and ultimate tensile strength. The unit, named after Blaise Pascal, is an SI coherent derived unit defined as one newton per square metre (N/m^{2}). It is also equivalent to 10 barye (10 Ba) in the CGS system. Common multiple units of the pascal are the hectopascal (1 hPa = 100 Pa), which is equal to one millibar, and the kilopascal (1 kPa = 1,000 Pa), which is equal to one centibar.

The unit of measurement called standard atmosphere (atm) is defined as 101325 Pa, or 101.325 kPa. Meteorological observations typically report atmospheric pressure in hectopascals per the recommendation of the World Meteorological Organization, thus a standard atmosphere or typical sea-level air pressure is about 1013 hPa. Reports in the United States typically use inches of mercury or millibars (hectopascals). In Canada, these reports are given in kilopascals.

== Etymology ==
The unit is named after Blaise Pascal, noted for his contributions to hydrodynamics and hydrostatics, and experiments with a barometer. The name pascal was adopted for the SI unit newton per square metre (N/m^{2}) by the 14th General Conference on Weights and Measures in 1971.

== Definition ==
The pascal is defined as the pressure exerted by a force of one newton perpendicularly upon an area of one square metre. It can be expressed in SI units as:

$${\rm 1~Pa = 1~kg/(m {\cdot} s^2) = 1~N/m^2 = 1~J/m^3, }$$

where kg is the kilogram, m is the metre, s is the second (as SI base units), J is the joule, and N is the newton (as SI derived units).

== Standard units ==
The unit of measurement called an atmosphere or a standard atmosphere (atm) is 101325 Pa (101.325 kPa). This value is often used as a reference pressure and specified as such in some national and international standards, such as the International Organization for Standardization's ISO 2787 (pneumatic tools and compressors), ISO 2533 (aerospace) and ISO 5024 (petroleum). In contrast, International Union of Pure and Applied Chemistry (IUPAC) recommends the use of 100 kPa as a standard pressure when reporting the properties of substances.

Unicode has dedicated code-points U+33A9 ㎩ SQUARE PA and U+33AA ㎪ SQUARE KPA in the CJK Compatibility block, but these exist only for backward-compatibility with some older ideographic character-sets and are therefore deprecated.

== Uses ==
The pascal (Pa) or kilopascal (kPa) as a unit of pressure measurement is widely used throughout the world and has largely replaced the pounds per square inch (psi) unit, except in some countries that still use the imperial measurement system or the US customary system, including the United States.

Geophysicists use the gigapascal (GPa) in measuring or calculating tectonic stresses and pressures within the Earth.

Medical elastography measures tissue stiffness non-invasively with ultrasound or magnetic resonance imaging, and often displays the Young's modulus or shear modulus of tissue in kilopascals.

In materials science and engineering, the pascal measures the stiffness, tensile strength and compressive strength of materials. In engineering the megapascal (MPa) is the preferred unit for these uses, because the pascal represents a very small quantity.

Approximate Young's modulus for common substances
| Material | Young's modulus (GPa) |
|---|---|
| Nylon 6 | 2–4 |
| Hemp fibre | 35 |
| Aluminium | 69 |
| Tooth enamel | 83 |
| Copper | 117 |
| Structural steel | 200 |
| Diamond | 1220 |

The pascal is also equivalent to the SI unit of energy density, the joule per cubic metre. This applies not only to the thermodynamics of pressurised gases, but also to the energy density of electric, magnetic, and gravitational fields.

The pascal is used to measure sound pressure. Loudness is the subjective experience of sound pressure and is measured as a sound pressure level (SPL) on a logarithmic scale of the sound pressure relative to some reference pressure. For sound in air, a pressure of 20 μPa is considered to be at the threshold of hearing for humans and is a common reference pressure, so that its SPL is zero.

The airtightness of buildings is measured at 50 Pa.

In medicine, blood pressure is measured in millimeters of mercury (mmHg, very close to one Torr). The normal adult blood pressure is less than 120 mmHg systolic BP (SBP) and less than 80 mmHg diastolic BP (DBP). Convert mmHg to SI units as follows: 1 mmHg = 0.13332 kPa. Hence the normal blood pressure in SI units is less than 16.0 kPa SBP and less than 10.7 kPa DBP. These values are similar to the pressure of water column of average human height; so pressure has to be measured on arm roughly at the level of the heart.

=== Hectopascal and millibar units ===
The units of atmospheric pressure commonly used in meteorology were formerly the bar (100000 Pa), which is close to the average air pressure on Earth, and the millibar. Since the introduction of SI units, meteorologists generally measure atmospheric pressure in hectopascals (hPa), equal to 100 pascals or 1 millibar. Exceptions include Canada, which uses kilopascals (kPa). In many other fields of science, prefixes that are a power of 1000 are preferred, which theoretically excludes hectopascal from use.

Many countries still use millibars to measure atmospheric pressure. In practically all other fields, the kilopascal is used instead.

== Multiples and submultiples ==
Decimal multiples and submultiples are formed using standard metric prefixes.

| Multiples | | | Submultiples | | |
| Value | Name | Symbol | Value | Name | Symbol |
|---|---|---|---|---|---|
| 10^{1} Pa | decapascal | daPa | 10^{−1} Pa | decipascal | dPa |
| 10^{2} Pa | hectopascal | hPa | 10^{−2} Pa | centipascal | cPa |
| 10^{3} Pa | kilopascal | kPa | 10^{−3} Pa | millipascal | mPa |
| 10^{5} Pa | bar (non-SI unit) | bar | | | |
| 10^{6} Pa | megapascal | MPa | 10^{−6} Pa | micropascal | μPa |
| 10^{9} Pa | gigapascal | GPa | 10^{−9} Pa | nanopascal | nPa |
| 10^{12} Pa | terapascal | TPa | 10^{−12} Pa | picopascal | pPa |
| 10^{15} Pa | petapascal | PPa | 10^{−15} Pa | femtopascal | fPa |
| 10^{18} Pa | exapascal | EPa | 10^{−18} Pa | attopascal | aPa |
| 10^{21} Pa | zettapascal | ZPa | 10^{−21} Pa | zeptopascal | zPa |
| 10^{24} Pa | yottapascal | YPa | 10^{−24} Pa | yoctopascal | yPa |
| 10^{27} Pa | ronnapascal | RPa | 10^{−27}Pa | rontopascal | rPa |
| 10^{30} Pa | quettapascal | QPa | 10^{−30} Pa | quectopascal | qPa |

== See also ==
- Atmospheric pressure
- Centimetre of water
- Meteorology
- Metric prefix
- Orders of magnitude (pressure)
- Pascal's law
- Pressure measurement
