= Step (unit) =

Roman unit of length

A step (Latin: gradus, pl. gradūs) was a Roman unit of length equal to 2½ Roman feet (pedes) or ½ Roman pace (passus). Following its standardization under Agrippa, one step was roughly equivalent to 0.81 yards or 0.74 meters.

The Byzantine pace (Ancient Greek: βήμα, bḗma) was an adaption of the Roman step, a distance of 2½ Greek feet. (Note: Schilbach, cited by Ménage.)

Similarly, the US customary pace is a distance of 2½ feet or 30 inches (760 mm).

== See also ==
- Pace (unit)
- Roman and Byzantine units
- US customary units
