= Dunam =

Ottoman unit of land area

A dunam (Ottoman Turkish, Arabic: دونم; Turkish: dönüm; Hebrew: דונם; Yiddish: דונאם), also known as a donum or dunum, is a unit of measurement of area. Its origin, also known as the old dunam, Turkish dunam, or Ottoman stremma, was the Ottoman unit that roughly represented the amount of agricultural land that could be plowed by a team of oxen in a day. It is analogous in role (but not equivalent) to the stremma in Byzantine Greek units or the acre in the English system. The legal definition was "forty standard paces in length and breadth", but its actual area varied considerably from place to place, from a little more than 900 m^{2} (0.22 acres) in Ottoman Palestine to around 2,500 m^{2} (0.62 acres) in Ottoman Iraq.

The unit is still in use in many areas previously ruled by the Ottomans. The modern definition is standardized, and the current dunam (or new dunam, metric dunam) is defined as exactly 1,000 square meters (0.10 ha; 0.25 acres).

== Ottoman origins ==
The name dönüm is from the Ottoman Turkish dönmek (دونمك 'to turn'), and literally means "to turn". Victor Louis Ménage has suggested this was probably a calque (literal translation) of the Byzantine Greek stremma, which also literally means "a turning" and has a similar size. This word likely migrated during the early period of Ottoman rule of Mysia-Bithynia when there would have been many Byzantine Greek-speaking citizens and Turkish-speaking administrators.

The Dictionary of Modern Greek defines the old "Ottoman stremma" as approximately 1,270 square meters (13,700 sq ft).

== Definitions ==
=== Albania, Bosnia and Herzegovina, Serbia, Montenegro ===
Various Balkan countries use the dunam, although they all use the metric dunam now of 1000 square meters. In Bosnia and Herzegovina and in Serbia the unit is called the dulum (дулум) or dunum (дунум). In Bosnia and Herzegovina it is known as a dunum (or dulum). In Albania it is called a dynym or dylym.

An exception is the region of Leskovac in south Serbia, where one dulum is equal to 1,600 square metres (17,222 sq ft).

=== Cyprus ===
In Cyprus, a donum is 14,400 square foot (1,338 m^{2}). In the Republic of Cyprus, Greek-Cypriots traditionally used the local Greek Cypriot dialect word σκάλες [skales], rather than the mainland Greek word stremma. Since 1986, Cyprus officially uses the square metre and the hectare.

A Cypriot donum consists of 4 evleks, each of which consists of 3,600 square foot (334 m^{2}).

=== Greece ===
In Greece, the old dönüm is called a "Turkish stremma", while today, a stremma (στρέμμα) or "royal stremma" is exactly one decare, like the metric dönüm.

Costas Lapavitsas suggests a value of 1,600 square metres (17,000 sq ft) for the dunam in the region of Naoussa in the early 20th century.

=== Israel, Palestine, Syria, and Turkey ===
In Israel, Palestine, Syria, Iraq, and Turkey, the dunam is now standardized on 1,000 square metres (10,764 ft^{2}), which is 1 decare. From the Ottoman period and through the early years of the British Mandate for Palestine, the size of a dunam was 919.3 square metres (9,895 sq ft), but in 1928, the metric dunam of 1,000 square metres (0.10 ha) was adopted. The metric dunam is still used today in Israel and Palestine.

=== United Arab Emirates ===
The Dubai Statistics Center and Statistics Centre Abu Dhabi use the metric dunam (spelt as donum) for data relating to agricultural land use. One donum equals 1,000 square metres (10,764 sq ft).

== Similar units ==
The Byzantine Greek stremma was the probable source of the Turkish unit. The zeugarion (ζευγάριον; Turkish çift, چفت) was a similar unit derived from the area plowed by a team of oxen in a day. The English unit acre is a measure of area for a similar size of land, although it developed separately. In Bulgaria, the decare (декар) is used, which is an SI unit, literally meaning 10 ares.

== See also ==
- Orders of magnitude (area), for other units of area
- Conversion of units
- Feddan (فدّان), a similar non-SI unit of area used in Egypt, Sudan, and Syria
- Resm-i dönüm, a land tax based on the area of a farm
