= Rope (unit) =

Unit of measurement

A rope may refer to any of several units of measurement initially determined or formed by ropes or knotted cords.

== Length ==
The Greco-Roman schoenus, supposedly based on an Egyptian unit derived from a wound reed measuring rope, may also be given in translation as a "rope". According to Strabo, it varied in length between 30 and 120 stadia (roughly 5 to 20 km) depending on local custom.

The Byzantine equivalent, the schoinion or "little rope", varied between 60 and 72 Greek feet depending upon the location.

The Thai sen of 20 Thai fathoms or 40 m also means and is translated "rope".

The Somerset rope was a former English unit used in drainage and hedging. It was 20 feet (now precisely 6.096 m).

== Area ==
The Romans used the schoenus as an alternative name for the half-jugerum formed by a square with sides of 120 Roman feet.

In Somerset, the rope could also double as a measure of area equivalent to 20 feet by 1 foot. Walls in Somerset were formerly sold "per rope" of 20 sq ft. (Note: See Lawrence for an example of calculating the expense of building a wall in Somerset by the rope.)

== Garlic ==
In medieval English units, the rope of garlic was a set unit of 15 heads of garlic. 15 such ropes made up the "hundred" of garlic.

== See also ==
- Egyptian, Greek, Roman, Thai, and English units
- Knotted cord
- Knot, a related unit
