= Stremma =

Greek unit of land area

The stremma (pl. stremmata; Greek: στρέμμα, strémma) is unit of land area used mainly in Greece and Cyprus, equal to 1,000 square metres or approximately 1/4 acre.

== History ==
The ancient Greek equivalent was the square plethron, which served as the Greeks' form of the acre. It was originally defined as the area plowed by a team of oxen in a day but was nominally standardised as the area enclosed by a square 100 Greek feet (pous) to a side. It was the size of a Greek wrestling square.

The Byzantine or Morean stremma continued to vary depending on the period and the quality of the land, but usually enclosed an area between 900 and 1 900 m^{2}. It was also originally known as a "plethron" but this was replaced during Byzantine times by the word "stremma", derived from the verb for "turning" the ground with a plough.

The Ottoman stremma or Turkish stremma, is the Greek (and occasionally English) name for the dunam, which is probably derived from the Byzantine unit. Again, this varied by region: some values include 1 270 m^{2}, and 1 600 m^{2}.

== See also ==
- 1 E3 m² for further comparisons
- Byzantine units
- Conversion of units
- Greek units
- Metric units
