= Walking distance measure =

Distance that can be travelled in a certain amount of time

The walking distance measure denotes the distance that can be travelled by walking in a fixed amount of time. In Japan, the standard measure for walking distance is 80 meters for 1 minute of walking time. It is the standard used in real estate listings. For example, if a building is a 10-minute walk from a particular park or train station, it is 800 meters away.

In the last century, throughout most Middle Eastern countries, it was common to give the distances between cities in walking distances. For example, Khaybar is ten days' journey by foot to Jeddah.

== See also ==
- Isochrone map
- Pacing (surveying)
- Pace (unit)
- League (unit)
- Parasang
- Biblical mile
