= Pacing (surveying) =

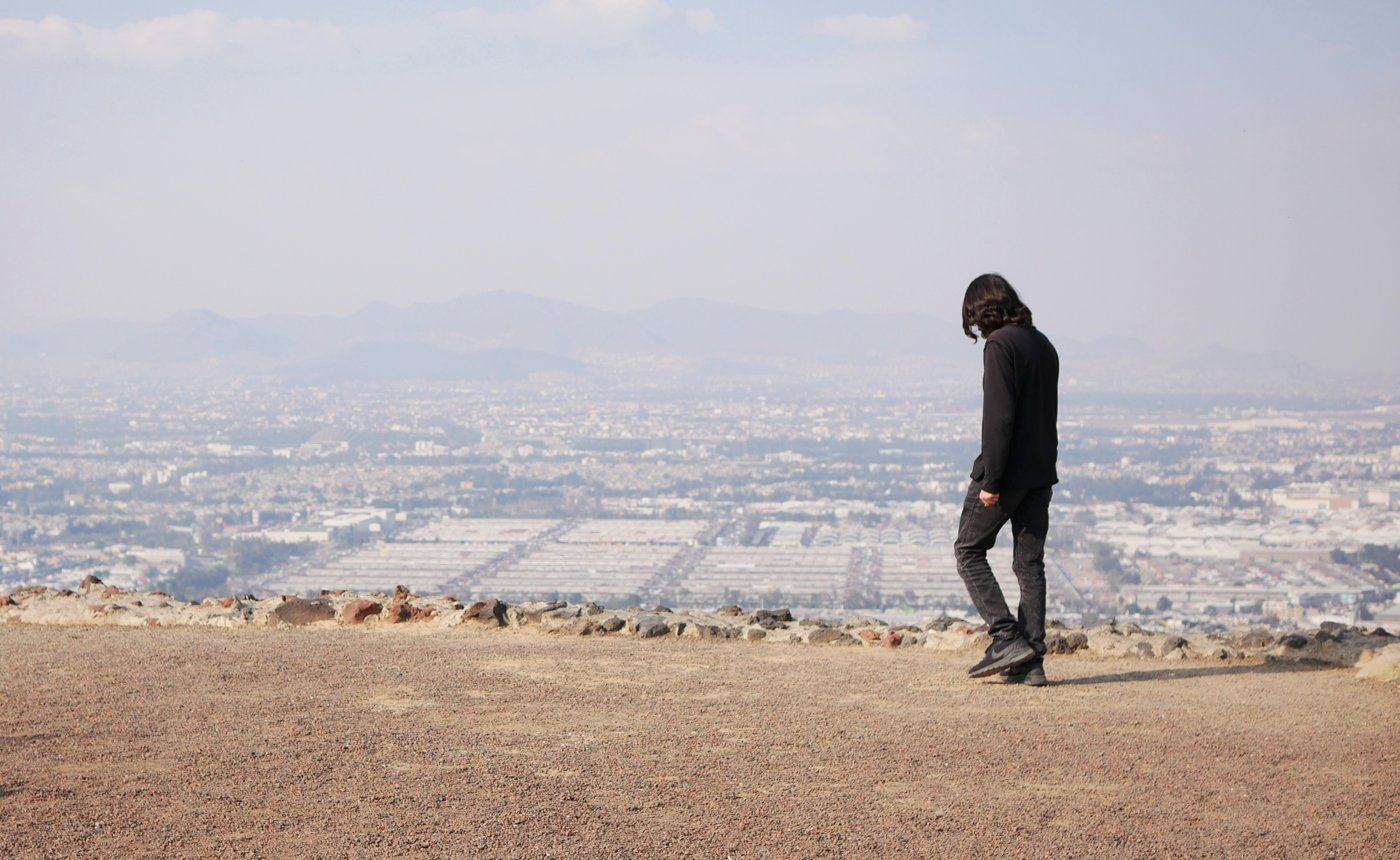
Man pacing on top of pyramid overlooking Mexico City

Pacing is a reasonably easy and quick method of measuring distance in the field. It is used to measure a distance and is often used with a sighting or a hand compass. Most commonly, pacing is split up into segments, such as chains, which are set measures of distance. By determining one's own pace, distance can easily be estimated.

== Applications ==
Common uses of pacing consist of measuring tree height or measuring the distance between plots. Pacing saves time but is not as accurate as using a tape measure and can be affected by terrain such as steep slopes, rocky areas, streams, and thick brush. A common practice in pacing when an obstacle is encountered is to offset or pace around the obstacle. However, sometimes pacing around an obstacle is not always an option. Good pacing can only be accomplished by practice. Knowing the distance of one's pace will help to ensure accuracy and precision of pacing distances.

== Other uses ==
Pacing can also be used with a map. In the field, pacing can be used to accomplish the correct distances referred by a map. Traversing a property line or boundary where distance and length are important produces opportunities for pacing to be applied to record accurate data.

== See also ==
- Bematist
- Distance measurement
- Pace (unit)
- Pace count beads
- Pundit (explorer)
- Walking distance measure
