= Plethron =

Ancient unit of Greek measurement (unit of length)

Plethron (Ancient Greek: πλέθρον, plural plethra) is an ancient Greek unit of measurement equal to 97 to 100 Greek feet (ποῦς, pous; c. 30 centimeters), although the measures for plethra may have varied from polis to polis. This was roughly the width of a typical ancient Greek athletic running-track.

A plethron could also be used as a unit of measured area, and reference to the unit in defining the size of a wrestling area is made by Libanius. A square plethron of c. 30 by 30 meters was used as the standard dimensions of a Greek wrestling square, since such competitions were held within the racing track in ancient Greece. In other connotations, it functioned as the Greek acre, and varied in size to accommodate the amount of land a team of oxen could plow in a day.

The plethron continued to be used in the Byzantine Empire, where its variant uses were ultimately codified to refer to an area defined by sides of 100 feet or 40 paces (βῆμα, bema). Ultimately, the unit came to be known as the "stremma", which continues as a metric unit in modern Greece.

== See also ==
- Acre
- Byzantine units
- Greek units
- Roman units
- Stremma
