= Schoenus =

Ancient Egyptian, Greek, and Roman unit of measurement

M17 X1 D21 G43 N35B N36 N21 Z1
Schoenus
in hieroglyphs

Schoenus (Latin: schœnus; Ancient Greek: σχοίνος, schoinos, lit. "rush rope"; Ancient Egyptian: i͗trw, lit. "river-measure") was an ancient Egyptian, Greek and Roman unit of length and area based on the knotted cords first used in Egyptian surveying.

== Length ==
The Greeks, who adopted it from the Egyptians, generally considered the schoinos equal to 40 stades, but neither the schoinos nor the stadion had an absolute value, and there were several regional variants of each. Strabo noted that it also varied with terrain, and that when he "ascended the hills, the measures of these schoeni were not everywhere uniform, so that the same number sometimes designated a greater, sometimes a less actual extent of road, a variation which dates from the earliest time and exists in our days." Herodotus (2.6 and 2.149) says that a schoenus is 60 stadia (or, in modern terms, about 10.5 kilometres (6.5 mi)). This agrees with the distance implied by the Triacontaschoenus stretching south of the First Cataract in Roman-era Nubia. Pliny the Elder, in his The Natural History (5.11) assumes that is 30 stadia. Strabo 17.1.24: says it is to be understood according to the place, but between 30 and 120 stadia. Isidore of Charax's schoenus—used in his Parthian Stations—has been given values between 4.7 and 5.5 km (2.9 and 3.4 mi), but the precise value remains controversial given the known errors in some of his distances.

The Byzantine schoinion or "little schoenus" (σχοινιον, skhoinion) was 20 000 Greek feet or 33⅓ stades.

== Area ==
The Romans also used the schoenus as a unit of area, equivalent to the actus quadratus or half-jugerum (2,523 m^{2} (27,160 sq ft)) formed by a square with sides of 120 Roman feet. The Heraclean Tables admonished that each schoenus should be planted with 4 olive trees and some grape vines, upon penalty of fines.

== See also ==
- Egyptian, Greek, and Roman units
- Rope and knot, related units
- Knotted cord, the surveying tool initially responsible for the schoenus
