= Bematist =

Ancient Greek surveyors

Bematist (Ancient Greek: βηματιστής), plural bematists or bematistae (Ancient Greek: βηματισταί), meaning 'step measurer' (from βῆμα bema, meaning 'step, pace'), were specialists in ancient Greece and ancient Egypt who measured distances by pacing.

== Measurements of Alexander's bematists ==
Bematists accompanied Alexander the Great on his campaign in Asia. Their measurements of the distances traveled by Alexander's army show a high degree of accuracy to the point that it had been suggested that they must have used an odometer, although there is no direct mentioning of such a device:

The overall accuracy of the bematists' measurements should be apparent. The minor discrepancies of distance can be adequately explained by slight changes in the tracks of roads during the last 2,300 years. The accuracy of the measurements implies that the bematists used a sophisticated mechanical device for measuring distances, undoubtedly an odometer such as described by Hero of Alexandria.

The table below lists distances of the routes as measured by two of Alexander's bematists, Baeton and Diognetus. They were recorded in Pliny's Naturalis Historia (NH 6.61–62). Another similar set of measurements is given by Strabo (11.8.9) following Eratosthenes. Eratosthenes calculated the circumference of the Earth based on work of Egyptian bematists.

	Pliny 6.61–62				Strabo 11.8.9				Actual distance		
Route	Milia passuum ^{1)}	English miles	Kilometers	Deviation	Stadia ^{2)}	English miles	Kilometers	Deviation	English miles	Kilometers	Route
Northern Caspian Gates – Hecatompylos	—	—	—	—	1960	225	362	0.8%	227	365	main road
Southern Caspian Gates – Hecatompylos	133	122	196	2.4%	—	—	—	—	125	201	main road
Hecatompylos – Alexandria Areion	575	529	851	0.4%	4530	521	838	1.9%	531	855	Silk Route
Alexandria Areion – Prophtasia	199	183	295	3.2%	1600	184	296	2.6%	189	304	Herat-Juwain
Prophtasia – Arachoti Polis	565	520	840	1%	4120	474	763	9.7%	525	845	Juwain – Kelat-i-Ghilzai
Arachoti Polis – Hortospana	250	230	370	0.4%	2000	230	370	0.4%	231	372	main road Kelat-i-Ghilzai – Kabul
Hortospana – Alexandria ad Caucasum	50	46	74	2.1%	—	—	—	—	47	76	Kabul – Begram
Alexandria ad Caucasum – Peucolatis	237	218	351	3.2%	—	—	—	—	211	340	Begram – Charsada
Peucolatis – Taxila	60	55	89	20%	—	—	—	—	69	111	Charsada – Taxila
Taxila – Hydaspes (Jhelum)	120	110	180	4.8%	—	—	—	—	105	169	Aurel Stein’s route
Alexandria Areion – Bactra – Zariaspa^{3)}	—	—	—	—	3870	445	716	1.6%	438	705	via Kala Nau, Bala Murghab, Maimana and Andkhui
Average				4.2%				2.8%			
Median				2.8%				1.9%			

Notes:
^{1)} 1 mille passus = 1,480 meters (1,620 yd)
^{2)} 1 Attic stadion = 606 feet 10 inches (184.96 m)
^{3)} The route is not recorded to have been followed by Alexander himself.

== List of bematists ==
- Amyntas
- Baeton
- Diognetus
- Philonides of Chersonissos

== See also ==
- Ancient Greek units of measurement
- Gromatici
- Surveyor's wheel
- Pace count beads

== Bibliography ==
- Engels, Donald W. (1978). Alexander the Great and the Logistics of the Macedonian Army. University of California Press, Los Angeles, 1978, ISBN 0-520-04272-7
