= Orders of magnitude (area) =

Comparison of a wide range of areas

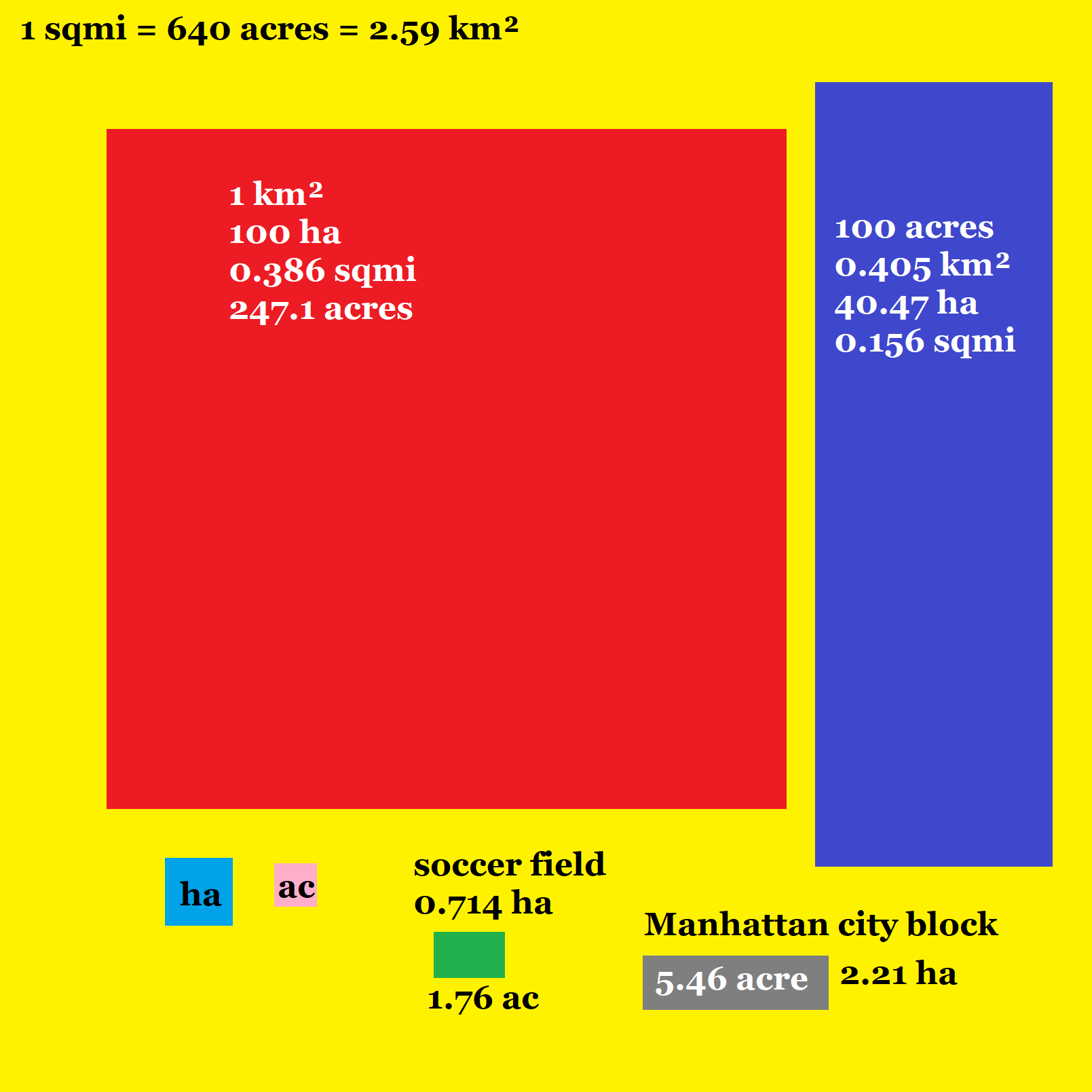
Image comparing various units: square mile (the entire yellow square), square kilometre, hectare and acre, as well as a soccer field and a Manhattan block.

An area of one square kilometre consists of 100 hectares each containing 10,000 square metres.

This page is a progressive and labelled list of the SI area orders of magnitude, with certain examples appended to some list objects.

== 10^{−70} to 10^{−9} square metres ==
List of orders of magnitude for area 10^{−70} to 10^{−9} square metres
Factor (m^{2})	Multiple	Value	Item
10^{−70}		2.6×10^{−70} m^{2}	Planck area, $\frac{G \hbar}{c^3}$
10^{−60}	1 square quectometre		
10^{−54}	1 square rontometre		
10^{−52}		100 rm^{2}	1 shed
10^{−48}	1 square yoctometre (ym^{2})	1 ym^{2}	
10^{−43}		100,000 ym^{2}	1 femtobarn
10^{−42}	1 square zeptometre (zm^{2})	1 zm^{2}	
10^{−36}	1 square attometre (am^{2})	1 am^{2}	
10^{−30}	1 square femtometre (fm^{2})	1 fm^{2}	
10^{−29}		66.52 fm^{2}	Thomson cross-section of the electron
10^{−28}		100 fm^{2}	1 barn, roughly the cross-sectional area of a uranium nucleus
10^{−24}	1 square picometre (pm^{2})	1 pm^{2}	
10^{−20}	1 square angstrom (Å^{2})	10,000 pm^{2}	
10^{−19}		100,000 pm^{2}	Area of a lipid bilayer, per molecule
10^{−19}		75,000–260,000 pm^{2}	Surface area of the 20 standard amino acids
10^{−18}	1 square nanometre (nm^{2})	1 nm^{2}	
10^{−16}		100 nm^{2}	Globular proteins: solvent-accessible surface area of a typical globular protein, having a typical molecular mass of ~35000 u (quite variable)
10^{−14}		17,000 nm^{2}	Cross-sectional area of a nuclear pore complex in vertebrates
10^{−12}	1 square micrometre (μm^{2})	6 μm^{2}	Surface area of an E. coli bacterium
10^{−10}		100 μm^{2}	Surface area of a red blood cell
10^{−9}		6,000–110,000 μm^{2}	Range of common LCD screen pixel sizes
10^{−9}		7,000 μm^{2}	Area of a dot printed using 300 dots per inch resolution
10^{−9}		8,000 μm^{2}	Cross-sectional area of a straight human hair that is 100 μm in diameter

== 10^{−8} to 10^{−1} square metres ==
List of orders of magnitude for areas 10^{−8} to 10^{−1} square metres
Factor (m^{2})	Multiple	Value	Item
10^{−8}		55,000 μm^{2}	Size of a pixel on a typical modern computer display
10^{−7}		2-400,000 μm^{2}	Cross-sectional area of a mechanical pencil lead (0.5-0.7 mm in diameter)
10^{−6}	1 square millimetre (mm^{2})	1–2 mm^{2}	Area of a human fovea
10^{−6}	1 square millimetre (mm^{2})	2 mm^{2}	Area of the head of a pin
10^{−5}		30–50 mm^{2}	Area of a 6–8 mm hole punched in a piece of paper by a hole punch
10^{−4}	1 square centimetre (cm^{2})	290 mm^{2}	Area of one side of a U.S. penny
10^{−4}	1 square centimetre (cm^{2})	500 mm^{2}	Area of a typical postage stamp
10^{−3}		1,100 mm^{2}	Area of a human retina
10^{−3}		4,600 mm^{2}	Area of the face of a credit card
10^{−2}	1 square decimetre (dm^{2})	10,000 mm^{2}	Index card (3 × 5 inches)
10^{−2}	1 square decimetre (dm^{2})	60,000 mm^{2}	American letter paper (11 × 8.5 inches, "A" size)
10^{−2}	1 square decimetre (dm^{2})	62,370 mm^{2}	International A4 paper (210 × 297 mm)
10^{−2}	1 square decimetre (dm^{2})	92,903 mm^{2}	1 square foot
10^{−1}		125,000 mm^{2}	International A3 paper (297 × 420 mm)
10^{−1}		180,000 mm^{2}	Surface area of a basketball (diameter 24 cm)
10^{−1}		250,000 mm^{2}	International A2 paper (420 × 594 mm)
10^{−1}		500,000 mm^{2}	International A1 paper (594 × 841 mm)

== 10^{0} to 10^{7} square metres ==
List of orders of magnitude for areas 10^{0} to 10^{7} square metres.
Factor (m^{2})	Multiple	Value	Item
10^{0}	1 square metre	1 m^{2}	International A0 paper (841 × 1189 mm)
10^{0}	1 square metre	1.73 m^{2}	A number commonly used as the average body surface area of a human
10^{0}	1 square metre	1–4 m^{2}	Area of the top of an office desk
10^{1}		10–20 m^{2}	A parking space
10^{1}		70 m^{2}	Approximate surface area of a human lung
10^{2}	1 square decametre (dam^{2})	100 m^{2}	One are (a)
10^{2}	1 square decametre (dam^{2})	162 m^{2}	Size of a volleyball court (18 × 9 metres)
10^{2}	1 square decametre (dam^{2})	202 m^{2}	Floor area of a median suburban three-bedroom house in the US in 2010: 2,169 sq ft (201.5 m^{2})
10^{2}	1 square decametre (dam^{2})	261 m^{2}	Size of a tennis court
10^{2}	1 square decametre (dam^{2})	437 m^{2}	Size of an NBA/WNBA/NCAA basketball court
10^{2}	1 square decametre (dam^{2})	845 m^{2}	Wing area of Airbus A380, the largest commercial airliner
10^{2}	1 square decametre (dam^{2})	978 m^{2}	Size of the primary mirror of the Extremely Large Telescope, the largest optical telescope in the world (under construction)
10^{3}	1 kilo square meter k(m^{2})	1,000 m^{2}	Surface area of a modern stremma or dunam
10^{3}	1 kilo square meter k(m^{2})	1,250 m^{2}	Surface area of the water in an Olympic-size swimming pool
10^{3}	1 kilo square meter k(m^{2})	4,047 m^{2}	1 acre
10^{3}	1 kilo square meter k(m^{2})	5,400 m^{2}	Size of an American football field
10^{3}	1 kilo square meter k(m^{2})	7,140 m^{2}	Size of a typical football (soccer) field
10^{4}	1 square hectometre (hm^{2})	10,000 m^{2}	1 hectare (ha)
10^{4}	1 square hectometre (hm^{2})	17,000 m^{2}	Approximate area of a cricket field (theoretical limits: 6,402 m^{2} to 21,273 m^{2})
10^{4}	1 square hectometre (hm^{2})	22,100 m^{2}	Area of a Manhattan city block
10^{4}	1 square hectometre (hm^{2})	53,000 m^{2}	Base of the Great Pyramid of Giza
10^{5}		195,000 m^{2}	Irish National Botanic Gardens
10^{5}		490,000 m^{2}	Vatican City
10^{5}		600,000 m^{2}	Total floor area of the Pentagon
10^{5}		659,611 m^{2}	Total floor area of Surat Diamond Bourse (largest office building)
10^{5}		887,800 m^{2}	AvtoVAZ main assembly building, Tolyatti, Russia (largest building by footprint)
10^{6}	1 mega square meter M(m^{2}) 1 square kilometre (km^{2})	1.76 km^{2}	New Century Global Center, Chengdu, China (largest building by total floor area)
10^{6}	1 mega square meter M(m^{2}) 1 square kilometre (km^{2})	2 km^{2}	Monaco (country ranked 192nd by area)
10^{6}	1 mega square meter M(m^{2}) 1 square kilometre (km^{2})	2.59 km^{2}	1 square mile
10^{6}	1 mega square meter M(m^{2}) 1 square kilometre (km^{2})	2.9 km^{2}	City of London (not all of modern London)
10^{7}		59.5 km^{2}	Manhattan Island (land area)
10^{7}		61 km^{2}	San Marino

== 10^{8} to 10^{14} square metres ==
Factor (m^{2})	Multiple	Value	Item
10^{8}		105 km^{2}	Paris (inner city only)
10^{8}		110 km^{2}	Walt Disney World
10^{8}		272 km^{2}	Taipei City
10^{8}		630 km^{2}	Toronto
10^{9}	1 giga square meter G(m^{2})	1,100 km^{2}	Hong Kong
10^{9}	1 giga square meter G(m^{2})	1,290 km^{2}	Los Angeles, California, United States
10^{9}	1 giga square meter G(m^{2})	1,962 km^{2}	Jacksonville, Florida; largest city in the Continental United States
10^{9}	1 giga square meter G(m^{2})	2,188 km^{2}	Tokyo
10^{9}	1 giga square meter G(m^{2})	3,130 km^{2}	Average area of an American county
10^{9}	1 giga square meter G(m^{2})	5,780 km^{2}	Administrative area of Bali
10^{9}	1 giga square meter G(m^{2})	8,030 km^{2}	Community of Madrid
10^{10}		11,000 km^{2}	Jamaica
10^{10}		30,528 km^{2}	Belgium
10^{10}		68,870 km^{2}	Lake Victoria
10^{10}		84,000 km^{2}	Austria
10^{11}		100,000 km^{2}	South Korea
10^{11}		167,996 km^{2}	Jiuquan in China
10^{11}		232,000 km^{2}	Total area covered by underwater search for Malaysia Airlines Flight 370 (including both 2014-2017 and 2018 searches)
10^{11}		238,397 km^{2}	Romania
10^{11}		301,338 km^{2}	Italy
10^{11}		357,000 km^{2}	Germany
10^{11}		377,900 km^{2}	Japan
10^{11}		510,000 km^{2}	Spain
10^{11}		780,000 km^{2}	Turkey
10^{12}	1 tera square meter T(m^{2}) 1 square megametre (million km^{2})	1.0 million km^{2}	Egypt
10^{12}	1 tera square meter T(m^{2}) 1 square megametre (million km^{2})	2 million km^{2}	Mexico
10^{12}	1 tera square meter T(m^{2}) 1 square megametre (million km^{2})	3.10 million km^{2}	Sakha (Yakutia) Republic in Russia (largest subnational governing body)
10^{12}	1 tera square meter T(m^{2}) 1 square megametre (million km^{2})	3.28 million km^{2}	India (country ranked 7th by area)
10^{12}	1 tera square meter T(m^{2}) 1 square megametre (million km^{2})	5 million km^{2}	Largest extent of the Roman Empire
10^{12}	1 tera square meter T(m^{2}) 1 square megametre (million km^{2})	7.74 million km^{2}	Australia (country ranked 6th by area)
10^{12}	1 tera square meter T(m^{2}) 1 square megametre (million km^{2})	8.5 million km^{2}	Brazil (country ranked 5th by area)
10^{12}	1 tera square meter T(m^{2}) 1 square megametre (million km^{2})	9.5 million km^{2}	China / United States (country ranked 3rd/4th by area)
10^{13}		10 million km^{2}	Canada (including water)
10^{13}		14 million km^{2}	Antarctica
10^{13}		14 million km^{2}	Arable land worldwide
10^{13}		16.6 million km^{2}	Surface area of Pluto
10^{13}		17 million km^{2}	Russia (country ranked 1st by area)
10^{13}		24 million km^{2}	Largest extent of Mongol Empire
10^{13}		30 million km^{2}	Africa
10^{13}		35.5 million km^{2}	Largest extent of the British Empire
10^{13}		38 million km^{2}	Surface area of the Moon
10^{13}		44.6 million km^{2}	Asia (largest continent by area)
10^{13}		70.5 million km^{2}	Indian Ocean
10^{13}		85.1 million km^{2}	Atlantic Ocean
10^{14}		144 million km^{2}	Surface area of Mars
10^{14}		150 million km^{2}	Land area of Earth
10^{14}		168.7 million km^{2}	Pacific Ocean
10^{14}		360 million km^{2}	Water area of Earth
10^{14}		510 million km^{2}	Total surface area of Earth

== 10^{15} to 10^{26} square metres ==
List of orders of magnitude for areas 10^{15} to 10^{26} square metres.
Factor (m^{2})	Multiple	Value	Item
10^{15}	1 peta square meter P(m^{2})	1,000 million km^{2}	Surface area of the white dwarf, Van Maanen's star
10^{15}	1 peta square meter P(m^{2})	7,600 million km^{2}	Surface area of Neptune
10^{16}		43,000 million km^{2}	Surface area of Saturn
10^{16}		61 000 million km^{2}	Surface area of Jupiter, the "surface" area of the spheroid (calculated from the mean radius as reported by NASA). The cross-sectional area of Jupiter, which is the same as the "circle" of Jupiter seen by an approaching spacecraft, is almost exactly one quarter the surface-area of the overall sphere, which in the case of Jupiter is approximately 1.535×10^{16} m^{2}.
10^{17}		2-600 000 million km^{2}	Surface area of the brown dwarf CT Chamaeleontis B.
10^{17}		460,000 million km^{2}	Area swept by the Moon's orbit of Earth
10^{18}	1 square gigametre (Gm^{2})	6.1 trillion km^{2}	Surface area of the Sun
10^{19}		30 trillion km^{2}	Surface area of the star Vega
10^{20}		100 trillion km^{2}	
10^{21}	1 zetta square meter Z(m^{2})	1 000 trillion km^{2}	
10^{22}		11,000 trillion km^{2}	Area swept by Mercury's orbit around the Sun
10^{22}		37,000 trillion km^{2}	Area swept by Venus' orbit around the Sun
10^{22}		71,000 trillion km^{2}	Area swept by Earth's orbit around the Sun
10^{23}		160,000 trillion km^{2}	Area swept by Mars' orbit around the Sun
10^{23}		281,000 trillion km^{2}	Surface area of a Dyson sphere with a radius of 1 AU
10^{24}	1 yotta square meter (m^{2}) 1 square terametre (Tm^{2})	1.9 quintillion km^{2}	Area swept by Jupiter's orbit around the Sun
10^{24}	1 yotta square meter (m^{2}) 1 square terametre (Tm^{2})	6.4 quintillion km^{2}	Area swept by Saturn's orbit around the Sun
10^{24}	1 yotta square meter (m^{2}) 1 square terametre (Tm^{2})	8.5 quintillion km^{2}	Surface area of the red supergiant star Betelgeuse
10^{25}		24 quintillion km^{2}	Surface area of the hypergiant star VY Canis Majoris
10^{25}		26 quintillion km^{2}	Area swept by Uranus' orbit around the Sun
10^{25}		64 quintillion km^{2}	Area swept by Neptune's orbit around the Sun
10^{26}		110 quintillion km^{2}	Area swept by Pluto's orbit around the Sun

== 10^{27} square metres and larger ==
List of orders of magnitude for areas 10^{27} square metres and larger.
Factor (m^{2})	Multiple	Value	Item
10^{30}	1 square petametre (Pm^{2})		
10^{31}		10 Pm^{2}	
10^{32}		200 Pm^{2}	Roughly the surface area of the Oort Cloud
10^{32}		300 Pm^{2}	Roughly the surface area of a Bok globule
10^{33}		1 000 Pm^{2}	
10^{34}		30 000 Pm^{2}	Roughly the surface area of The Bubble nebula
10^{35}		100 000 Pm^{2}	
10^{36}	1 square exametre (Em^{2})		
...
10^{41}		700 000 Em^{2}	Roughly the area of Milky Way's galactic disk
10^{42}	1 square zettametre (Zm^{2})		
...
10^{48}	1 square yottametre (Ym^{2})		
10^{54}	1 square ronnametre (Rm^{2})	2.4 Rm^{2}	Surface area of the observable universe

== See also ==
- Orders of magnitude
- Lists of political and geographic subdivisions by total area
