= 10-Minute Walk =

Parks-advocacy movement in the U.S.

Washington Square Park, New York City

The 10-Minute Walk, also known as the 10-Minute Walk to a Park, is a parks-advocacy movement led by The Trust for Public Land to ensure that everyone in the United States lives within a ten-minute walk to a high-quality park or green space.

== History and adoption ==
More than 300 mayors of large and small cities across the United States have committed to the goal, including the mayors of the four largest cities in the U.S.: New York City, Los Angeles, Chicago, and Houston. Urban parks are increasingly seen by those in municipal government as a solution to many inner-city challenges. This initiative seeks to provide physical and mental health benefits, opportunities for physical activity, proximity to nature, neighborhood and community revitalization, and environmental benefits for citizens through the creation of urban parks. Health studies demonstrate that an increase in exercise, including walking alone, may foster longevity in older adults.

The effort was adopted as a resolution at the 85th annual United States Conference of Mayors (USCM) convention in 2017 as a goal for cities to increase parks and green space as a civic responsibility. The concept has been supported by several community-based nonprofit organizations: the National Recreation and Park Association (NRPA), the Urban Land Institute (ULI), and Fields in Trust in the UK. A ten-minute walk is considered to be one-half-mile (0.80 km), which is the distance the National Park Service (NPS) and the Centers for Disease Control and Prevention (CDC) uses when they link park access and public health. The first city in the U.S. to achieve a 10-Minute Walk to a park for every resident was San Francisco.

== See also ==
- Park conservancy
- Walking distance measure
- 15-minute city
