= Ethiopian units of measurement =

Units of measurement used in Ethiopia

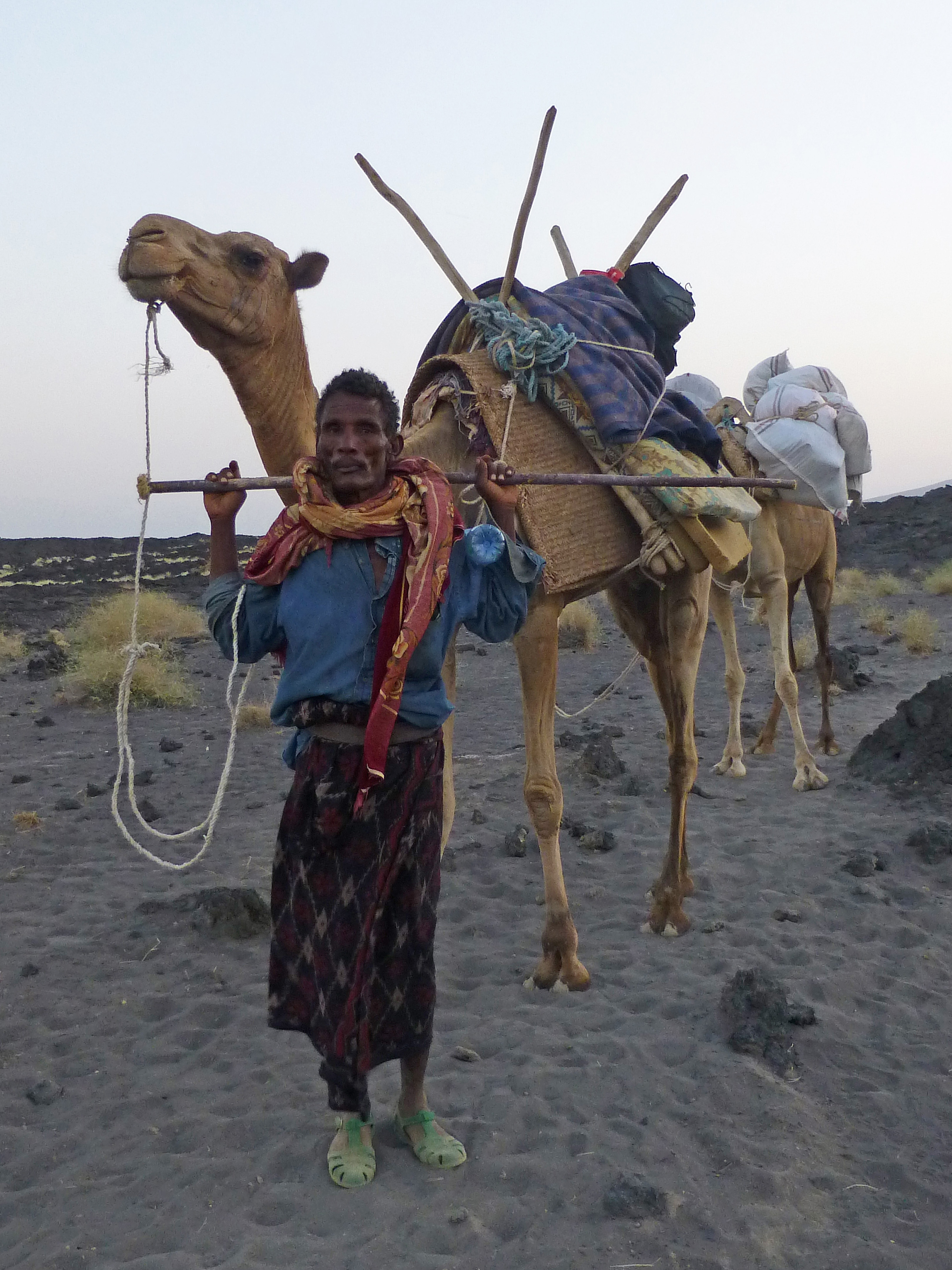
A common unit of weight in Ethiopia was the load - a simple measure of the amount carried by a beast of burden such as a camel

A number of different units of measurement have been used in Ethiopia. The values of most of these units are not well defined. In 1963, Ethiopia adopted the metric system.

== Pre-metric era ==
These units have also been referred to as Abyssinian units of measurements.

=== Length ===
Different units were used to measure length.

1 pic = 0.686 metres

1 farsang = 5070 m

1 berri = 1/3 farsang (approx. 3 pics)

=== Mass ===
A number of units were used to measure mass. One rotto is approximately equal to 0.311 kilograms. Some other units are provided below.

1 drachm = 1/120 rotto

1 derime = 1/120 rotto

1 wakea (ounce) = 1/12 rotto

1 mocha = 1/10 rotto

=== Capacity ===
Two types of measuring system were used, one for dry measures and one for liquid measures.

==== Dry ====
Different units were used to measure dry capacities. One madega is approximately equal to 0.44 litres.

1 ardeb = 10 or 24 madega (these may sometimes be referred to as either the long ardeb, equal to 24 madega, or the short ardeb, equal to 10 madega)

==== Liquids ====
The kuba(kubaya)pronounced in Ethiopia is approximately equal to 1.016 litres.

== Household units ==
More than 70 different units are used in an ordinary household. Some of the more important units used are kilograms, kunna, medeb, esir, bobo, pieces, litres, tassa, kubaya, birchiko, sini, bottles, guchiye, sahen and weket.

Details for some of the common units of measurements are given below:

- Medeb: meaning "heap", can be large or small, and is mainly used for vegetables.
- Tassa: A large serving can (often for cereals, pulses and liquids).
- Sini: A small ceramic cup often used for coffee, pulses (e.g. oilseeds) and spices.
- Birchiko: A glass often for pulses and liquids
- Kubaya: A mug, often for cereals, pulses and liquids.
- Esir: A "bundle" often used for cabbage and chat (a mild stimulant)
- Tikil: A wrap often for sugar and coffee.

(Note: Most of the above are actual household items, such as tassa translating to can, and sini mainly being used for serving coffee, not measuring coffee or any other substances.)

== Land measurement ==
The size of the gasha measured by rope (sometimes called "qalad") varied with the type of land, according to Mahtama Sellase, in the following manner:

Location or situation	Size of gasha
Rich land in the dega, or high plateau	15 × 15 qalads
Poor land in the plateau	20 × 9 qalads
Wayna dega, or lower plateau	12 × 8 qalads
Pasture land too steep or too exposed to wind or heat to allow cultivation	15 × 9 qalads
