= Uncia (unit) =

Ancient Roman unit of length

Roman inch
- Unit system: Roman
- Unit of: length
- Symbol: 𐆑

Conversions
1 𐆑 in ...	... is equal to ...
- SI base units: 24.67 mm
- U.S. customary: 0.97 in

The uncia (plural: unciae, lit. "a twelfth") was a Roman unit of length, weight, and volume. It survived as the Byzantine liquid ounce (Ancient Greek: οὐγγία, oungía) and the origin of the English inch, ounce, and fluid ounce.

The Roman inch was equal to 1/12 of a Roman foot (pes), which was standardized under Agrippa to about 0.97 inches or 24.67 millimeters.

The Roman ounce was 1/12 of a Roman pound.

== See also ==
- Ancient Roman weights and measures
