= Parasang =

Historical Persian unit of travel distance

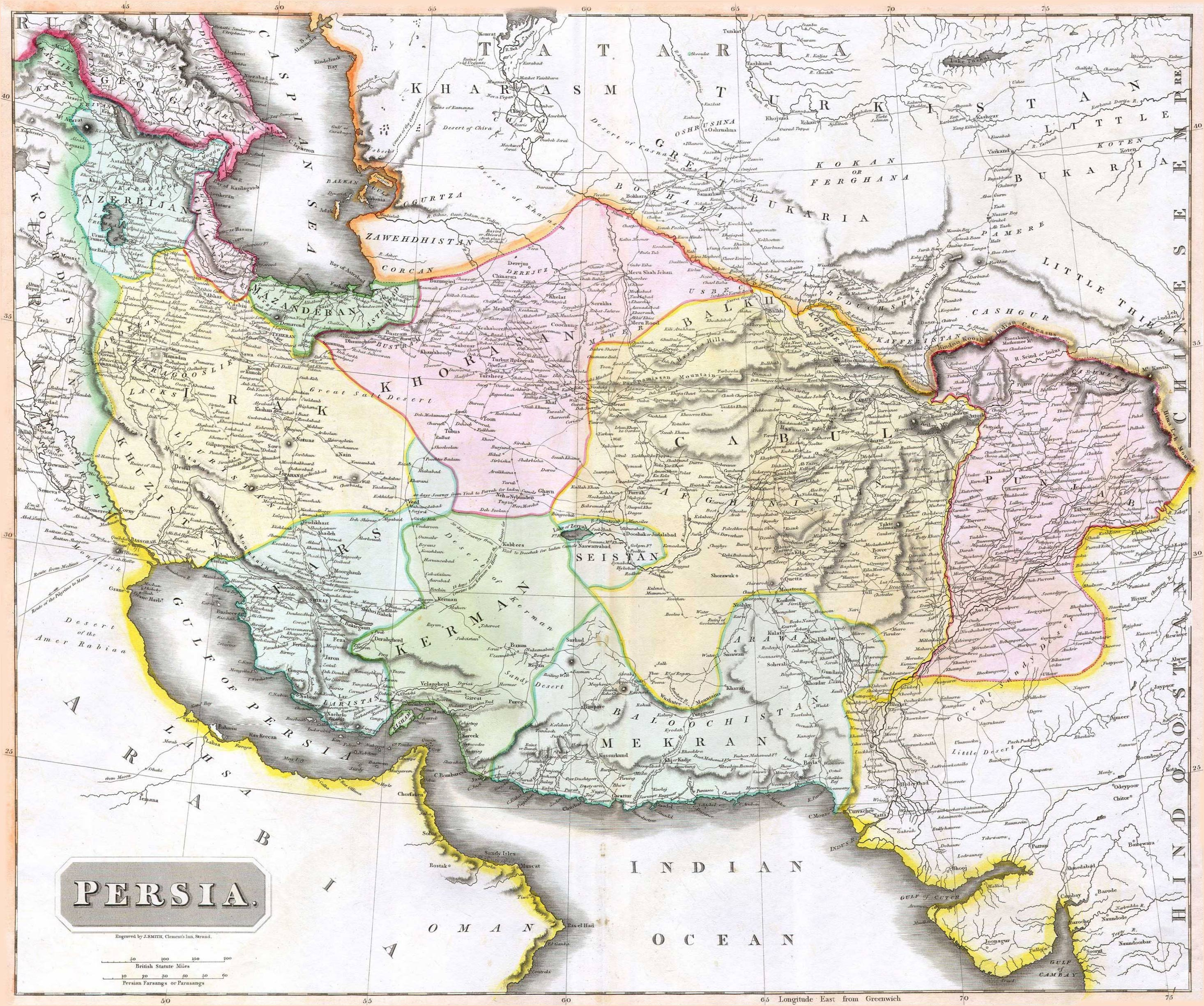
1814 map of Persia during the Qajar dynasty, with scale bars in the bottom left corner for both British Statute Miles and "Persian Farsangs or Parasangs"

The parasang (Persian: فرسنگ, romanized: farsang), also known as a farsakh (Arabic: فَرْسَخ, romanized: farsaḵ), is a historical Iranian unit of walking distance, the length of which varied according to terrain and speed of travel. The European equivalent is the league. In modern terms the distance is about 3 or 3½ miles (6 km).

Fersah was an Ottoman unit of distance. It was based on the distance covered by a horse in normal gait per hour. Its modern definition (parasang) is 5.685 km (3.532 mi). There were other definitions. According to Islam Encyclopaedia, ıt was sometimes 6.985 km (4.340 mi) or 6.230 km (3.871 mi).

== Historical usage ==
The parasang may have originally been some fraction of the distance an infantryman could march in some predefined period of time. Mid-5th-century BC Herodotus (v.53) speaks of an army traveling the equivalent of five parasangs per day.

In antiquity, the term was used throughout much of the Middle East, and the Old Iranian language from which it derives can no longer be determined (only two—of what must have been dozens—of Old Iranian languages are attested). There is no consensus with respect to its etymology or literal meaning. In addition to its appearance in various forms in later Iranian languages (e.g. Middle Persian frasang or Sogdian fasukh), the term also appears in Greek as parasangēs (παρασάγγης), in Latin as parasanga, in Hebrew as parasa (פרסה), in Armenian as hrasakh (հրասախ), in Georgian as parsakhi, in Syriac as parsḥā (ܦܪܣܚܐ), in Turkish as fersah, and in Arabic as farsakh (فرسخ). The present-day New Persian word is also farsakh (فرسخ), and should not be confused with the present-day farsang (فرسنگ), which is a metric unit. (Note: The present-day New Persian farsang is a metric unit of 6 km, established by act of Iranian parliament in 1926. The non-metric farsakh was defined by Arab astronomers as variously one 25th or one 22⅔^{d} or as one 18½^{th} of a caliphate terrestrial degree (= 3-4 Arab miles), but the unit remained ambiguous in practice even in modern times. In late 19th-century Luristan, a farsakh was said to be as far as the sound of a drum reached, while in Khorasan different distances were given depending on whether one travelled on foot or on horseback, and a Kurd curiously described it as the distance covered between retying his shoe-laces. In Robert Byron's 1933-1934 travels through the orient, the Road to Oxiana gives distances in farsakhs that "are now 'stabilised' at four [statute] miles, but in common parlance varies from three to seven.")

The earliest surviving mention of the parasang comes from the mid-5th-century BC Herodotus (Histories ii.6, v.53, vi.42), who defines the measure to be equivalent to 30 stadia, or half a schoenus. A length of 30 stadia is also given by several later Greek and Roman writers (10th-century Suidas and Hesychius, 5th/4th-century BC Xenophon Anab. ii.2.6). The 6th-century AD Agathias (ii.21) however—while referring to Herodotus and Xenophon—notes that in his time the contemporary Persians considered the parasang to have only 21 stadia. Strabo (xi.xi.5) also notes that some writers considered it to be 60, others 40, and yet others 30. In his 1st-century Parthian stations, Isidore of Charax "evidently [used for schoenus] the same measure as the Arabic parasang (while in Persia proper 4 sch[onii] equal 3 par[asang])."

The 1st-century Pliny (Natural History vi.26) noted that the Iranians themselves assigned different lengths to it. The Bundahishn (GBd XXII), a 9th/10th-century text of Zoroastrian tradition, glosses Avestan language hathra as equivalent to a "parasang of 1000 paces" (a Roman mile), and then defines the parasang as the distance at which a man with good eyesight could determine whether a beast of burden was black or white. On the authority of older sources, the 14th-century Qazvinian historiographer Hamdullah Mostofi recorded that in the 10th century the north-eastern parasang was 15,000 paces, the north-western one was 18,000 paces, and that of the south-west was merely 6,000 paces (but the "true" parasang, so Mostofi, was 9,000 paces). Recalling local legend, Mostofi states the unit was defined by the mythological Kai Kobad to be equal to 12,000 cubits.

Following the 30-stadia definition of Herodotus and Xenophon, the parasang would be equal to either 5.7 km (Olympic measure) or 5.3 km (Attic measure). But in 1920, Kenneth Mason of the Royal Geographical Society deduced that the parasang used in Xenophon's Babylonian travel accounts was equal to only 2.4 miles (3.9 km). A mid-1960s search for the Parthian city of Hekatompylos based on distances given in mid-4th-century BC chronologies of Alexander's conquests generated empirical estimates of ten stades to the English mile (1.609 km), and three miles to the parasang (4.827 km). "Whatever the basis of calculation, theoretical values for the stade and the parasang must be sought which do not greatly exceed [those] estimates." A 1985 suggestion proposes that the parasang and Attic stade were defined in terms of the Babylonian beru, an astronomically derived sexagesimal unit of time and linear distance. At 1 beru = 60 stadia = 2 parasang, the parasang could then "be expressed as 10,800 'common' [i.e. trade] Babylonian cubits, or 18,000 Attic feet, both figures exactly." A 2010 study of the term parasang in Xenophon's account of Cyrus the Younger's late-5th-century BC campaign against Artaxerxes II demonstrated that the length of Xenophon's parasang varied with weather and the terrain across which the army travelled. The parasangs were longer when the road was flat and dry, but shorter when travel was slower.

The term has survived in Modern Greek in the stereotypical expression "απέχει παρασάγγας", i.e., "it is parasangs away", meaning that something is very far away from something else, particularly in terms of quality. As Hebrew 'parsah' (pl. parsoth), the parasang also finds use in the Babylonian Talmud, in several uses, for instance in a description of the biblical ladder to heaven, the width of which is given as 8,000 parsaoth (Chullin 91b). In the commentary of Pesachim 9, the 4th-century Rabbah bar bar Hana, on the authority of the 3rd-century Rabbi Johanan, gives ten parsoth as the distance that a man can walk in a day. The farsang was also used as an Ethiopian unit for length.

The Ginza Rabba, a religious text written in Mandaic, typically measures distances in parasangs.
