= Baeton =

Ancient Bematist

Baeton (Ancient Greek: Βαίτων) was a man of ancient Macedonia who lived in the 4th century BCE. He was a contemporary of Alexander the Great, and participated in his campaigns, with his colleague Diognetus, as a bematist (ὁ Ἀλεξάνδρου βηματιστής) or "road engineer", that is, someone who measures distances in his marches.

He wrote a work upon the subject entitled The Stations of Alexander's March (σταθμοί τῆς Ἀλεξάνδρου πορείας). Aside from a couple of stray quotes in the Natural History of Pliny the Elder, and the Deipnosophistae of Athenaeus, this work is lost, and no record exists of its contents. Pliny mentions that a copy of the surveys of Baeton and Diognetus was given by Zenobius, treasurer of Alexander the Great, to the geographer Patrocles.
