= Resm-i dönüm =

Land tax in the Ottoman Empire

The resm-i dönüm was a land tax in the Ottoman Empire; it was a divani tax paid each year to the landowner or timar holder, typically on 1 March.

The resm-i dönüm was based on the dönüm, a measure of farm size; this is parallel to the resm-i çift, a tax based on the çift (the area that could be ploughed by one team of oxen). Generally, both taxes had to be paid, and the terms may at times have been interchangeable - taxation in the Ottoman Empire was a complex patchwork of overlapping taxes which evolved over time.

The amount of resm-i dönüm was proportional to the size of the farm. In some cases, the resm-i dönüm was specific to a kind of lease agreement that an otherwise landless peasant would make with a sipahi (feudal lord) and it may actually have resembled a rent more than a tax.

Since the rate of resm-i dönüm was recorded in tax codes such as kanunname, and the area of a dönüm is known, tax documents which detail the amount of resm-i dönüm paid by each community allow historians to understand the varying areas of land under cultivation at different times and in different provinces. One preserved kanunname, for the Morea in 1716, set resm-i dönüm at 60 akçes per çift, although the area of a çift would vary between provinces, and it was stated that the area of a çift was smaller for high-quality farmland than for low-quality farmland.

One variation was resm-i dönüm-i haşhâş, a tax applied to opium growers in place of Ashar, at a rate of 1 krş per dönüm - although the detailed accounts of opium production recorded in defters suggest that in this case resm-i dönüm may actually have been levied by weight of produce, rather than by area.

In some Albanian-speaking areas, resm-i dönüm may have been a tax specific to vineyards.
