= Knot (unit) =

Unit of speed

knot
- An airspeed indicator, which shows speed in knots

General information
- Unit system: meteorology; aviation; maritime
- Unit of: speed
- Symbol: kn, kt

Conversions
1 kn in ...	... is equal to ...
- km/h: 1.852
- mph: 1.15078
- m/s: 0.514444
- ft/s: 1.68781

The knot (/nɒt/) is a unit of speed equal to one nautical mile per hour, exactly 1.852 km/h (approximately 1.151 mph or 0.514 m/s). The ISO standard symbol for the knot is kn. The same symbol is preferred by the Institute of Electrical and Electronics Engineers (IEEE), while kt is also common, especially in aviation, where it is the form recommended by the International Civil Aviation Organization (ICAO). The knot is a non-SI unit. The knot is used in meteorology, and in maritime and air navigation. A vessel travelling at 1 knot along a meridian travels approximately one minute of geographic latitude in one hour.

== Definitions ==
1 international knot =
1 nautical mile per hour (by definition),
1852.000 metres per hour (exactly),
0.51444 metres per second (approximately),
1.15078 miles per hour (approximately),
20.25372 inches per second (approximately)
1.68781 feet per second (approximately).

The length of the internationally agreed nautical mile is 1852 m. The US adopted the international definition in 1954, having previously used the US nautical mile (1853.248 m). The UK adopted the international nautical mile definition in 1970, having previously used the UK Admiralty nautical mile (6080 ft or 1853.184 m).

Conversions between common units of speed
	m/s	km/h	mph (mi/h)	knot	fps (ft/s)
1 m/s =	1	3.600000	2.236936*	1.943844*	3.280840*
1 km/h =	0.277778*	1	0.621371*	0.539957*	0.911344*
1 mph (mi/h) =	0.44704	1.609344	1	0.868976*	1.466667*
1 knot =	0.514444*	1.852	1.150779*	1	1.687810*
1 fps (ft/s) =	0.3048	1.09728	0.681818*	0.592484*	1

(* = approximate values)

== Usage ==
The speeds of vehicles relative to the fluids in which they travel (boat speeds and air speeds) can be measured in knots. For consistency, the speeds of navigational fluids (ocean currents, tidal streams, river currents, and wind speeds) are also measured in knots. Thus, speed over the ground (SOG; ground speed (GS) in aircraft) and rate of progress towards a distant point ("velocity made good", VMG) can also be given in knots. Since 1979, the International Civil Aviation Organization lists the knot as permitted for temporary use in aviation, but no end date to the temporary period has been agreed as of 2024.

== Origin ==
Until the mid-19th century, vessel speed at sea was measured using a chip log. This consisted of a wooden panel, attached by line to a reel, and weighted on one edge to float perpendicularly to the water surface and thus present substantial resistance to the water moving around it. The chip log was cast over the stern of the moving vessel and the line allowed to pay out. Knots tied at a distance of 47 feet 3 inches (14.4018 m) from each other, passed through a sailor's fingers, while another sailor used a 30-second sand-glass (28-second sand-glass is the currently accepted timing) to time the operation. The knot count would be reported and used in the sailing master's dead reckoning and navigation.

This method gives a value for the knot of 20 1/4 inches per second or 1.85166 kilometres per hour. The difference from the modern definition is less than 0.02%.

Derivation of knots spacing:

$1~\textrm{kn} = 1852~\textrm{m/h} = 0.5144~\textrm{m/s}$, so in $28$ seconds that is $14.40$ metres per knot.

== Modern use ==
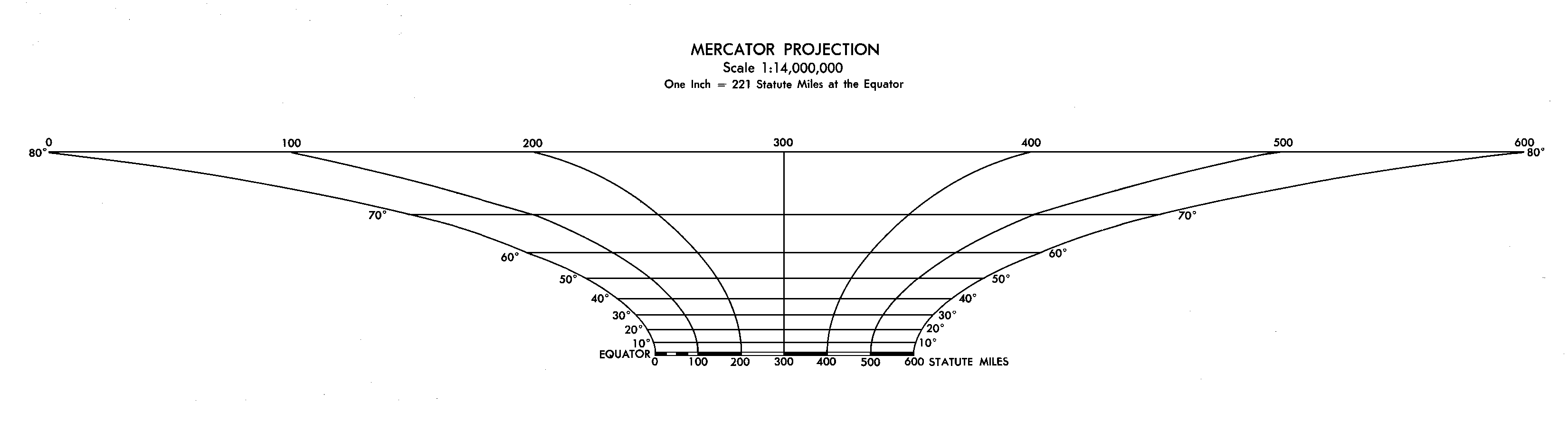
Graphic scale from a Mercator projection world map, showing the change with latitude

Although the unit knot does not fit within the SI system, its retention for nautical and aviation use is important because the length of a nautical mile, upon which the knot is based, is closely related to the longitude/latitude geographic coordinate system. As a result, nautical miles and knots are convenient units to use when navigating an aircraft or ship.

On a standard nautical chart using Mercator projection, the horizontal (East–West) scale varies with latitude. On a chart of the North Atlantic, the scale varies by a factor of two from Florida to Greenland. A single graphic scale, of the sort on many maps, would therefore be useless on such a chart. Since the length of a nautical mile, for practical purposes, is equivalent to about a minute of latitude, a distance in nautical miles on a chart can easily be measured by using dividers and the latitude scales on the sides of the chart. Recent British Admiralty charts have a latitude scale down the middle to make this even easier.

Speed is sometimes incorrectly expressed as "knots per hour", which would mean "nautical miles per hour per hour" and thus would refer to acceleration.

=== Aeronautical terms ===
Prior to 1969, airworthiness standards for civil aircraft in the United States Federal Aviation Regulations specified that distances were to be in statute miles, and speeds in miles per hour. In 1969, these standards were progressively amended to specify that distances were to be in nautical miles, and speeds in knots.

The following abbreviations are used to distinguish between various measurements of airspeed:

- TAS is "knots true airspeed", the airspeed of an aircraft relative to undisturbed air
- KIAS is "knots indicated airspeed", the speed shown on an aircraft's pitot-static airspeed indicator
- CAS is "knots calibrated airspeed", the indicated airspeed corrected for position error and instrument error
- EAS is "knots equivalent airspeed", the calibrated airspeed corrected for adiabatic compressible flow for the particular altitude

The indicated airspeed is close to the true airspeed only at sea level in standard conditions and at low speeds. At 11000 m (36000 ft), an indicated airspeed of 300 kn may correspond to a true airspeed of 500 kn in standard conditions.

== See also ==
- Beaufort scale
- Hull speed, which deals with theoretical estimates of practical maximum speed of displacement hulls
- Knot count
- Knotted cord
- Metre per second
- Orders of magnitude (speed)
- Rope (unit)
