= Knotted cord =

Primitive distance-measuring tool

A knotted cord was a primitive surveyor's tool for measuring distances. It is a length of cord with knots at regular intervals. They were eventually replaced by surveyor's chains, which being made of metal were less prone to stretching and thus were more accurate and consistent.

Knotted cords were used by many ancient cultures. The Greek schoenus is referred to as a rope used to measure land. Ropes generally became cables and chains with Pythagoras making the Greek agros a chain of 10 stadia equal to a nautical mile c 540 BC. The Romans used a waxed cord for measuring distances.

A knotted cord 12 lengths long (the units do not matter) closed into a loop can be used to lay out a right angle by forming the loop of cord into a 3–4–5 triangle. This could be used for laying out the corner of a field or a building foundation, for instance.

== Ancient Egypt ==
Knotted cords were used by rope stretchers, royal surveyors who measured out the sides of fields (Egyptian 3ht). The knotted cords (Egyptian ht) were 100 royal cubits in length, with a knot every hayt or 10 royal cubits. The rope stretchers stretched the rope in order to take the sag out, as well as to keep the measures uniform.

Since land in ancient Egypt was measured using several different units, there would have been knotted cords with the knots spaced in each unit. Among these were the mh t3 or land cubits, remen royal cubits, rods or ha3t, generally the lengths in multiples of 100 units. The longest measured length listed in the Rhind Mathematical Papyrus is a circumference of about a Roman mile with a diameter of 9 khet.

Despite many popular claims, there is no surviving evidence that the 3-4-5 triangle, and by implication the Pythagoras' theorem, was used in Ancient Egypt to lay out right angles, such as for the pyramids. The historian Moritz Cantor first made the conjecture in 1882. Right angles were certainly laid out accurately in Ancient Egypt; their surveyors did use knotted cords for measurement; Plutarch recorded in Isis and Osiris (around 100 AD) that the Egyptians admired the 3-4-5 triangle; and the Berlin Papyrus 6619 from the Middle Kingdom (before 1700 BC) made statements that suggest knowledge of Pythagoras' theorem. The 3-4-5 triangle was used because it is the smallest right-angled triangle with whole-numbered side lengths. However, no Egyptian text before 300 BC actually mentions the use of the theorem to find the length of a triangle's sides. Therefore, the historian of mathematics Roger Cooke published that the Ancient Egyptians probably did know the Pythagorean theorem, but concludes that "there is no evidence that they used it to construct right angles".

== See also ==
- Arithmetic rope
- Rope (unit)
- Knot (unit)
