= Pace (unit) =

Unit of length equal to one or two steps

A pace is a unit of length consisting either of one normal walking step (approximately 0.75 metres or 30 inches), or of a double step, returning to the same foot (approximately 1.5 metres or 60 inches). The normal pace length decreases with age and some health conditions. The word "pace" is also used for units inverse to speed, used mainly for walking and running, commonly minutes per kilometer.

The word "pace" is also used to translate similar formal units in other systems of measurement. Pacing is also used as an informal measure in surveying, with the "pace" equal to two of the surveyor's steps reckoned through comparison with a standard rod or chain.

== Standardized units ==
Like other traditional measurements, the pace started as an informal unit of length, but was later standardized, often with the specific length set according to a typical brisk or military marching stride.

In the United States the pace is an uncommon customary unit of length denoting a brisk single step and equal to 2 1/2 feet or 30.0 inches or 76.2 centimetres.

The Ancient Roman pace (Latin: passus) was notionally the distance of a full stride from the position of one heel where it raised off of the ground to where it set down again at the end of the step: two steps, one by each foot. Under Marcus Vipsanius Agrippa, it was standardized as the distance of two steps (gradūs) or five Roman feet (pedes), about 1.48 meters or 4 feet 10 inches. One thousand paces were described simply as mille passus or passuum, now known as a Roman mile; this is the origin of the English term "mile".

The Byzantine pace (Ancient Greek: βῆμα, bḗma) was an adaption of the Roman step, a distance of 2½ Greek feet. (Note: Schilbach, cited by Ménage.) The double pace (βῆμα διπλοῦν, bḗma diploûn), meanwhile, was similar to the Roman unit, comprising 5 Greek feet.

The Welsh pace (Welsh: cam) was reckoned as 3 Welsh feet of 9 inches and thus may be seen as similar to the English yard: 3 paces made up a leap and 9000 a Welsh mile.

The Russian arshin is an archaic unit equal to 28 inches (710 mm) by definition. This originates from the Ottoman arşın of around 27 inches (690 mm), defined as an arm's length. (Note: With a related unit less than this, the Ottoman arş, corresponding to the cubit or forearm.) In the 18th century, the Anglophile Peter the Great redefined the value of the units in terms of English units. The new arshin became a 'pace' of exactly 28". Military use of this measure encouraged the thought of it as a pace, and thus easily measured in the field, and so it became the calibration measure for rifle sights.

== See also ==
- Anthropic units
- Bematist
- Roman & Byzantine units
- English & Welsh units
- Pacing in surveying
- Pace count beads
- Horse gait
