= Ancient Greek units of measurement =

System of measurement used in Ancient Greece

Ancient Greek units of measurement varied according to location and epoch. Systems of ancient weights and measures evolved as needs changed; Solon and other lawgivers also reformed them en bloc. Some units of measurement were found to be convenient for trade within the Mediterranean region and these units became increasingly common to different city states. The calibration and use of measuring devices became more sophisticated. By about 500 BC, Athens had a central depository of official weights and measures, the Tholos, where merchants were required to test their measuring devices against official standards.

== Length ==
Some Greek measures of length were named after parts of the body, such as the δάκτυλος (daktylos, plural: δάκτυλοι daktyloi) or finger (having the size of a thumb), and the πούς (pous, plural: πόδες podes) or foot (having the size of a shoe). The values of the units varied according to location and epoch (e.g., in Aegina a pous was approximately 333 mm (13.1 in), whereas in Athens (Attica) it was about 296 mm (11.7 in)), but the relative proportions were generally the same.

Smaller units of length
Unit	Greek name	Equal to	Modern equivalent	Description
daktylos	δάκτυλος		19.3 mm (0.76 in)	finger
kondylos	κόνδυλος	2 daktyloi	38.5 mm (1.52 in)	knuckle
palaistē or dōron	παλαιστή, δῶρον	4 daktyloi	77.1 mm (3.04 in)	palm
dichas or hēmipodion	διχάς, ἡμιπόδιον	8 daktyloi	154.1 mm (6.07 in)	half foot
lichas	λιχάς	10 daktyloi	192.6 mm (7.58 in)	distance from thumb-tip to tip of outstretched index finger
orthodōron	ὀρθόδωρον	11 daktyloi	211.9 mm (8.34 in)	straight hand's width
spithamē	σπιθαμή	12 daktyloi	231.2 mm (9.10 in)	span of all fingers
pous	πούς	16 daktyloi	308.2 mm (12.13 in)	foot
pygmē	πυγμή	18 daktyloi	346.8 mm (13.65 in)	forearm
pygōn	πυγών	20 daktyloi	385.3 mm (15.17 in)	distance from elbow to fist
pēchys	πῆχυς	24 daktyloi	462.3 mm (18.20 in)	cubit
Except where noted, based on Smith (1851). Metric equivalents are approximate.

Smaller units derived from the daktylos
	daktylos	kondylos	doron	dichas	lichas	orthodoron	spithame	pous	pygme	pygon	pechus	royal pechus
daktylos	1	1/2	1/4	1/8	1/10	1/11	1/12	1/16	1/18	1/20	1/24	1/27
kondylos	2	1	1/2	1/4	1/5	2/11	1/6	1/8	1/9	1/10	1/12	2/27
doron	4	2	1	1/2	2/5	4/11	1/3	1/4	2/9	1/5	1/6	4/27
dichas	8	4	2	1	4/5	8/11	2/3	1/2	4/9	2/5	1/3	8/27
lichas	10	5	2 1/2	1 1/4	1	10/11	5/6	5/8	5/9	1/2	5/12	10/27
orthodoron	11	5 1/2	2 3/4	1 3/8	1 1/10	1	11/12	11/16	11/18	11/20	11/24	11/27
spithame	12	6	3	1 1/2	1 1/5	1 1/11	1	3/4	2/3	3/5	1/2	4/9
pous	16	8	4	2	1 3/5	1 5/11	1 1/3	1	8/9	4/5	2/3	16/27
pygme	18	9	4 1/2	2 1/4	1 4/5	1 7/11	1 1/2	1 1/8	1	9/10	3/4	2/3
pygon	20	10	5	2 1/2	2	1 9/11	1 2/3	1 1/4	1 1/9	1	5/6	20/27
pechus	24	12	6	3	2 2/5	2 2/11	2	1 1/2	1 1/3	1 1/5	1	8/9
royal pechus	27	13 1/2	6 3/4	3 3/8	2 7/10	2 5/11	2 1/4	1 11/16	1 1/2	1 7/20	1 1/8	1
meters	0.01926	0.03853	0.07706	0.15411	0.19264	0.21191	0.23117	0.30823	0.34676	0.38529	0.46234	0.52014

Larger units of length
Unit	Greek name	Equal to	Modern equivalent	Description
pous	πούς		0.308 m (1.01 ft)	foot
haploun bēma	ἁπλοῦν βῆμα	2 1/2 podes	0.77 m (2.5 ft)	step
bēma, diploun bēma	βῆμα, διπλοῦν βῆμα	5 podes	1.54 m (5.1 ft)	pace
orgyia	ὄργυια	6 podes	1.85 m (6.1 ft)	fathom
kalamos, akaina or dekapous	κάλαμος, ἄκαινα, δεκάπους	10 podes	3.08 m (10.1 ft)	10 feet
hamma	ἅμμα	60 podes	18.5 m (20.2 yd)	knot, link of a chain
plethron	πλέθρον	100 podes	30.8 m (33.7 yd)	100 feet
stadion	στάδιον	600 podes	184.9 m (202.2 yd)	an eighth of a Roman mile
diaulos	δίαυλος	2 stadia	369.9 m (404.5 yd)	double pipe
hippikon	ἱππικόν	4 stadia	739.7 m (808.9 yd)	length of a hippodrome
milion	μίλιον	8 stadia	1.479 km (1,617 yd)	Roman mile
dolichos	δόλιχος	12 stadia	2.219 km (1.379 mi)	long race
parasanges, or league	παρασάγγης	30 stadia	5.548 km (3.447 mi)	adopted from Persia
schoinos	σχοινός	40 stadia	7.397 km (4.596 mi)	adopted from Egypt
stage		160 stadia	29.8 km (18.5 mi)	
Except where noted, based on Smith (1851). Metric equivalents are approximate.

Larger units derived from the pous
	pous	bema haplun	bema diplun	orguia	akaina	hamma	plethron	stadion
pous	1	2/5	1/5	1/6	1/10	1/60	1/100	1/600
bema haplun	2 1/2	1	1/2	5/12	1/4	1/24	1/40	1/240
bema diplun	5	2	1	5/6	1/2	1/12	1/20	1/120
orguia	6	2 2/5	1 1/5	1	3/5	1/10	3/50	1/100
akaina	10	4	2	1 2/3	1	1/6	1/10	1/60
hamma	60	24	12	10	6	1	3/5	1/10
plethron	100	40	20	16 2/3	10	1 2/3	1	1/6
stadion	600	240	120	100	60	10	6	1
meters	0.30823	0.77057	1.54115	1.8494	3.0823	18.4938	30.823	184.94

== Area ==
The ordinary units used for land measurement were:

Units of surface measurement
Unit	Greek name	Equal to	Modern equivalent	Description
pous	πούς		950 cm^{2} (1.02 sq ft)	square foot
hexapodēs	ἑξαπόδης	36 podes	3.42 m^{2} (36.8 sq ft)	square six-foot
akaina	ἄκαινα	100 podes	9.50 m^{2} (102.3 sq ft)	rod
hēmiektos	ἡμίεκτος	833 1/3 podes	79.2 m^{2} (853 sq ft)	half a sixth
hektos	ἕκτος	1,666 2/3 podes	158.3 m^{2} (1,704 sq ft)	a sixth of a plethron
aroura	ἄρουρα	2,500 podes	237.5 m^{2} (2,556 sq ft)	field
plethron	πλέθρον	10,000 podes	950 m^{2} (10,200 sq ft)	
Except where noted, based on Smith (1851). Metric equivalents are approximate.

== Volume ==
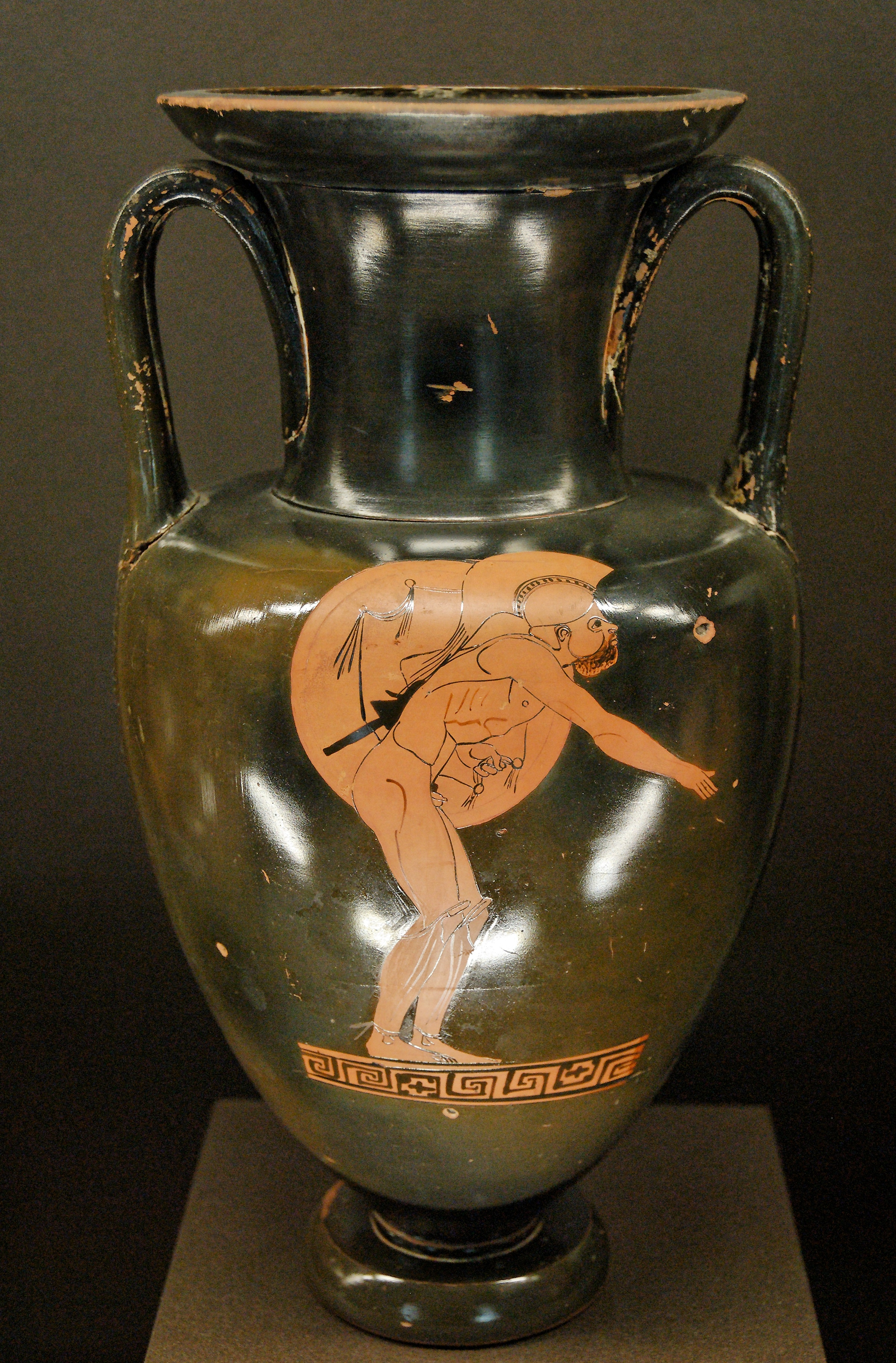
Neck amphora depicting an athlete
running the hoplitodromos by the Berlin
Painter, c. 480 BC, Louvre.

Greeks measured volume according to either solids or liquids, suited respectively to measuring grain and wine. A common unit in both measures throughout historic Greece was the cotyle or cotyla whose absolute value varied from one place to another between 210 ml and 330 ml. The basic unit for both solid and liquid measures was the κύαθος (kyathos, plural: kyathoi).

The Attic liquid measures were:

Attic measures of liquid capacity
Unit	Greek name	Equal to	Modern equivalent	Description
kochliarion	κοχλιάριον		4.5 mL (0.15 US fl oz; 0.16 imp fl oz)	spoon
chēmē	χήμη	2 kochliaria	9.1 mL (0.31 US fl oz; 0.32 imp fl oz)	a measure
mystron	μύστρον	2 1/2 kochliaria	11.4 mL (0.39 US fl oz; 0.40 imp fl oz)	Roman ligula
konchē	κόγχη	5 kochliaria	22.7 mL (0.77 US fl oz; 0.80 imp fl oz)	shell-full
kyathos	κύαθος	10 kochliaria	45.5 mL (1.54 US fl oz; 1.60 imp fl oz)	Roman cyathus
oxybaphon	ὀξυβαφον	1 1/2 kyathoi	68.2 mL (2.31 US fl oz; 2.40 imp fl oz)	Roman acetabulum
tetarton, hēmikotylē	τέταρτον, ἡμικοτύλη	3 kyathoi	136.4 mL (4.61 US fl oz; 4.80 imp fl oz)	Roman quartarius
kotylē, tryblion or hēmina	κοτύλη, τρύβλιον, ἡμίνα	6 kyathoi	272.8 mL (9.22 US fl oz; 9.60 imp fl oz)	Roman cotyla or hemina
xestēs	ξέστης	12 kyathoi	545.5 mL (1.153 US pt; 0.960 imp pt)	Roman sextarius
chous	χοῦς	72 kyathoi	3.27 L (6.9 US pt; 5.75 imp pt)	Roman congius
keramion	κεράμιον	8 choes	26.2 L (6.9 US gal; 5.8 imp gal)	Roman amphora quadrantal
metrētēs	μετρητής	12 choes	39.3 L (10.4 US gal; 8.6 imp gal)	amphora
Except where noted, based on Smith (1851). Metric equivalents are approximate.

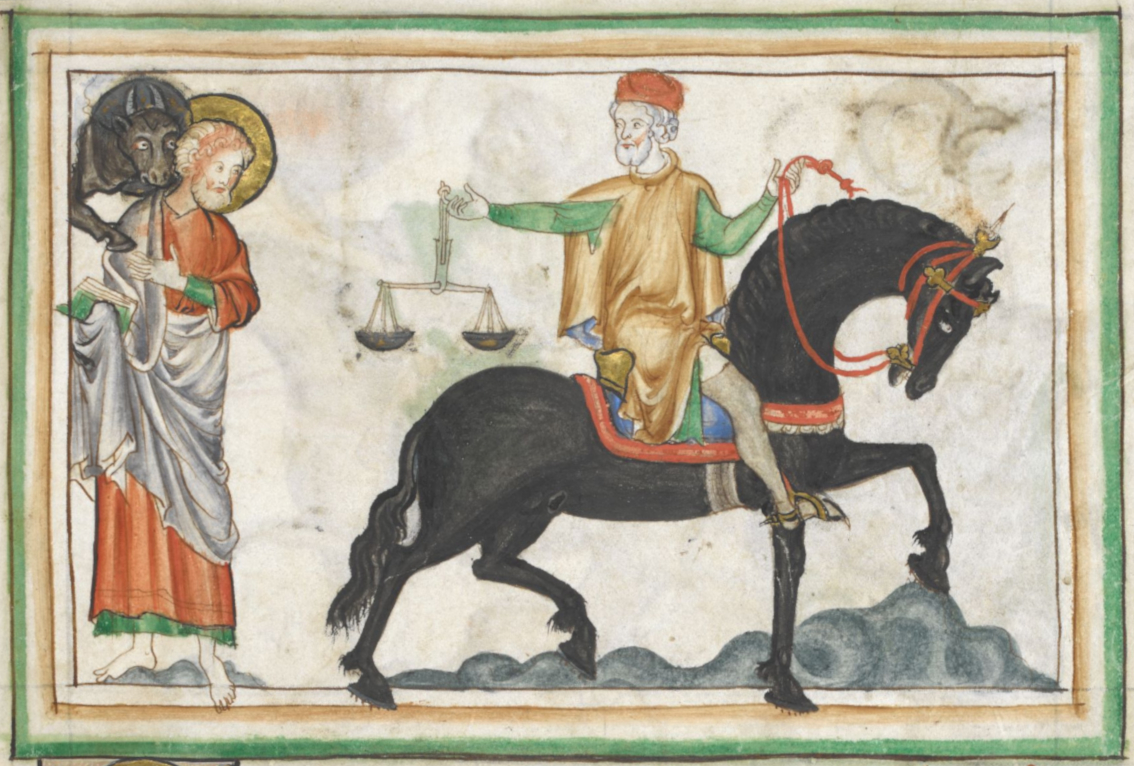
Illustration of the Third Horseman of the Apocalypse holding a set of scales; in the Book of Revelation he proclaims "A choinix of wheat for a denarius, and three choinikes of barley for a denarius;" indicating high food prices during a famine.

and the Attic dry measures of capacity were:

Attic measures of dry capacity
Unit	Greek name	Equal to	Modern equivalent	Description
kochliarion	κοχλιάριον		4.5 mL (0.15 US fl oz; 0.16 imp fl oz)	
kyathos	κύαθος	10 kochliaria	45.5 mL (1.54 US fl oz; 1.60 imp fl oz)	Roman cyathus
oxybaphon	ὀξυβαφον	1 1/2 kyathoi	68.2 mL (2.31 US fl oz; 2.40 imp fl oz)	Roman acetabulum
kotylē or hēmina	κοτύλη, ἡμίνα	6 kyathoi	272.8 mL (9.22 US fl oz; 9.60 imp fl oz)	Roman cotyla or hemina
xestēs	ξέστης	12 kyathoi	545.5 mL (1.153 US pt; 0.960 imp pt)	Roman sextarius
choinix	χοῖνιξ	24 kyathoi	1.09 L (2.3 US pt; 1.92 imp pt)	The daily grain ration of an adult man.
hēmiekton	ἡμίεκτον	4 choinikes	4.36 L (1.15 US gal; 0.96 imp gal)	Roman semimodius
hekteus	ἑκτεύς	8 choinikes	8.73 L (2.31 US gal; 1.92 imp gal)	Roman modius
medimnos	μέδιμνος	48 choinikes	52.4 L (13.8 US gal; 11.5 imp gal)	
Except where noted, based on Smith (1851). Metric equivalents are approximate.

== Currency ==
The basic unit of Athenian currency was the obol, weighing approximately 0.72 grams of silver:

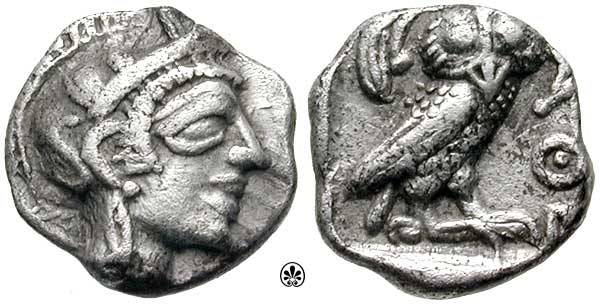
An obol, Attica, Athens, weighing 0.69g After 449 BC

Unit	Greek name	Equivalent	Weight
obol or obolus	ὀβολός	1/6 drachma, 4 tetartemorions	0.72 g (0.023 ozt)
drachma	δραχμή	6 obols	4.3 g (0.14 ozt)
mina	μνᾶ	100 drachmae	
talent	τάλαντον	60 minae	

== Mass ==
Mass is often associated with currency since units of currency involve prescribed amounts of a given metal. Thus for example the English pound has been both a unit of mass and a currency. Greek masses similarly bear a nominal resemblance to Greek currency yet the origin of the Greek standards of weights is often disputed. There were two dominant standards of weight in the eastern Mediterranean: a standard that originated in Euboea and that was subsequently introduced to Attica by Solon, and also a standard that originated in Aegina. The Attic/Euboean standard was supposedly based on the barley corn, of which there were supposedly twelve to one obol. However, weights that have been retrieved by historians and archeologists show considerable variations from theoretical standards. A table of standards derived from theory is as follows:

Unit	Greek name	Equivalent	Metric Equivalent	Aeginetic standard
obol or obolus	ὀβολός		0.72 g (0.025 oz)	1.05 g (0.037 oz)
drachma	δραχμή	6 obols	4.31 g (0.152 oz)	6.3 g (0.22 oz)
mina	μνᾶ	100 drachmae	431 g (15.2 oz)	630 g (22 oz)
talent	τάλαντον	60 minae	25.86 kg (57.0 lb)	37.8 kg (83 lb)

== Time ==
Athenians measured the day by sundials and unit fractions. Periods during night or day were measured by a water clock (clepsydra) that dripped at a steady rate and other methods. Whereas the day in the Gregorian calendar commences after midnight, the Greek day began after sunset. Athenians named each year after the Archon Eponymous for that year, and in Hellenistic times years were reckoned in quadrennial epochs according to the Olympiad.

In archaic and early classical Greece, months followed the cycle of the Moon which made them not fit exactly into the length of the solar year. Thus, if not corrected, the same month would migrate slowly into different seasons of the year. The Athenian year was divided into 12 months, with one additional month (Poseidon deuterons, thirty days) being inserted between the sixth and seventh months every second year. Even with this intercalary month, the Athenian or Attic calendar was still fairly inaccurate and days had occasionally to be added by the Archon Basileus. The start of the year was at the summer solstice (previously it had been at the winter solstice) and months were named after Athenian religious festivals, 27 mentioned in the Hibah Papyrus, circa 275 BC.

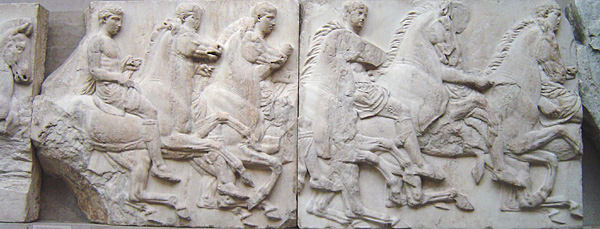
This section of a frieze from the Elgin Marbles shows a cavalry procession that was part of the quadrennial Greater Panathenaic festival, always held in the month Hekatombion.

Month	Greek name	Gregorian equivalent
Hecatombaeon	Ἑκατομβαιών	June–July
Metageitnion	Μεταγειτνιών	July–August
Boedromion	Βοηδρομιών	August–September
Pyanepsion	Πυανεψιών	September–October
Maemacterion	Μαιμακτηριών	October–November
Poseideon	Ποσειδεών	November–December
Gamelion	Γαμηλιών	December–January
Anthesterion	Ἀνθεστηριών	January–February
Elaphebolion	Ἐλαφηβολιών	February–March
Munychion	Μουνυχιών	March–April
Thargelion	Θαργηλιών	April–May
Scirophorion	Σκιροφοριών	May–June

== See also ==
- Ancient Roman units of measurement
- Byzantine units of measurement
- Level staff
