= Byzantine units of measurement =

System of measurement used in the Byzantine Empire

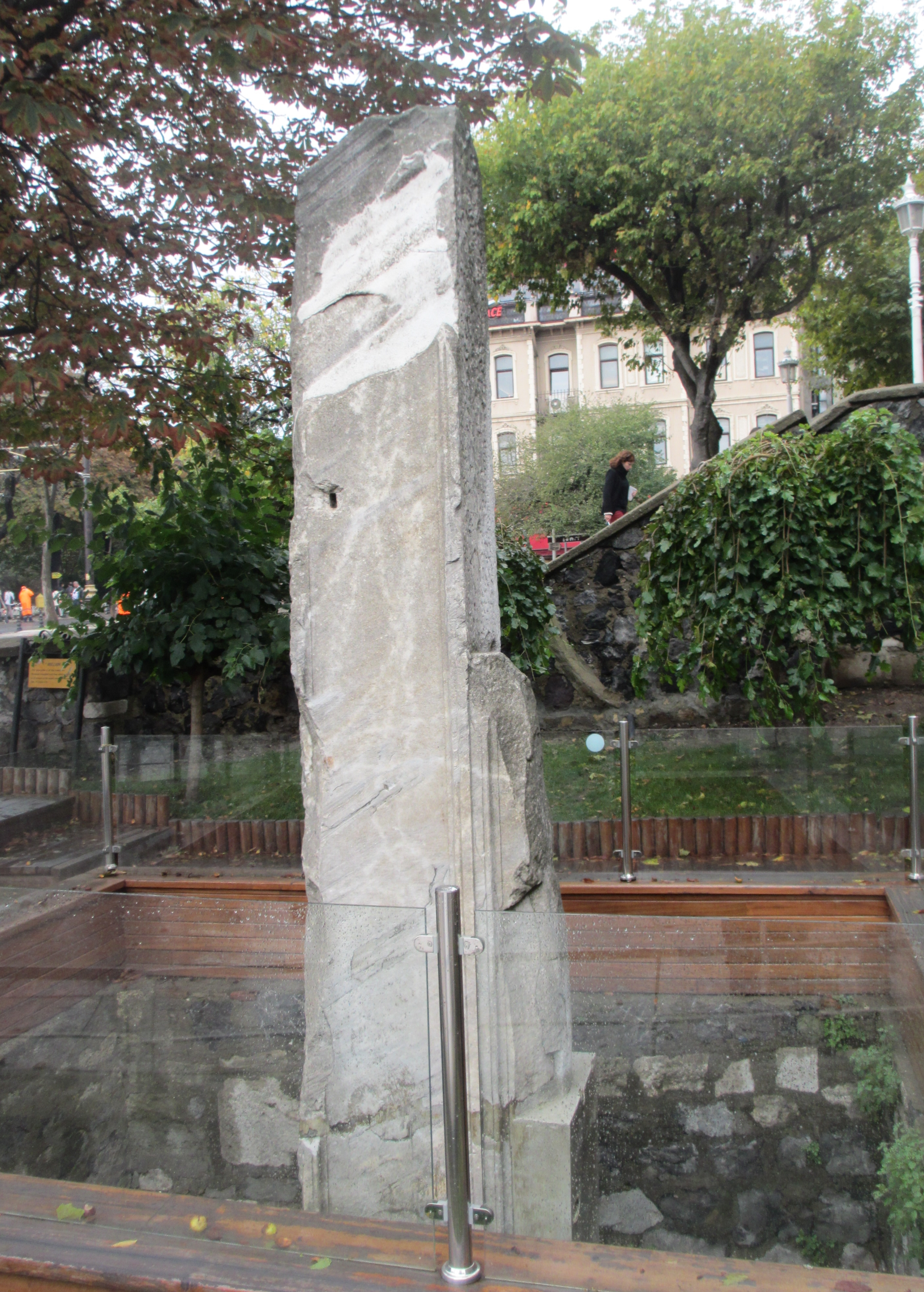
The excavated remains of the Milion zero-mile marker in Istanbul (the former Constantinople).

Byzantine units of measurement were a combination and modification of the ancient Greek and Roman units of measurement used in the Byzantine Empire.

Until the reign of Justinian I (527–565), no universal system of units of measurement existed in the Byzantine world, and each region used its traditional measures. Justinian began the process of standardization that resulted in a specifically Byzantine system, chiefly due to the need of such a system for the fiscal administration. Official measurement and weighing was performed subject to an array of charges including the mestikon, miniatikon, zygastikon, kambaniatikon, gomariatikon, and samariatikon. Despite the central government's insistence on the use of official measures, other systems continued to be used in parallel, whether due to local traditions or foreign influences, or in order to cover the necessities of specific trades or crafts. In addition, from the 12th century, foreign merchants such as the Venetians, Pisans, and Genovese operating within the Empire received the right to use their own systems.

== Length ==
The Byzantine Empire continued to employ the anthropometric units used by the Greeks and Romans.

Weights and measures acts were sometimes undertaken by the emperors as forms of tax reform. An 11th-century guide to Byzantine tax collection contains emendations concerning the Emperor Michael's (Note: Probably but not certainly Michael IV (r. 1034–1041).) addition of a palm to the fathom used in computing the schoinion, (Note: The text survives in a 14th-century copy but is dated from its internal evidence.) an act which reduced the holders' taxable area by about 5%.

Units of length
Unit	Greek name	Greek feet	meters	Notes
Digit (Finger)	dáktylos (δάκτυλος)	1/16	0.0195	also called monas (μονάς), "unit", as the smallest unit of length.
Palm	palaistḗ (παλαιστή) anticheir (αντιχειρ)	1/4	0.0787	
Half-pous; Half-foot	hēmipódion (ἡμιπόδιον)	1/2	0.1574	
Span	spithamḗ (σπιθαμή)	3/4	0.2361	
Pous (Foot)	poûs (ποῦς)	1	0.3123	Derived from the ancient Greek foot, the standard foot length in Byzantium seems to have been 0.3123 m, but in practice the length fluctuated between 0.308 and 0.320 m
Public Cubit	dêmosios pêkhys (δημόσιος πῆχυς)	1 1/2	0.4688	lit. "forearm" The Public Cubit counted 24 daktyloi and was used mainly in construction, hence was also called lithikos ("stone"), [xylo]pristikos ("[wood]-sawing"), tektonikos ("builder's"). The Imperial or Geometric Cubit counted 32 daktyloi and was used for the measurement of fields for the purpose of tax assessment. Local variants also existed for various other commodities.
Imperial or Geometric Cubit	basilikos/geômetrikos pêkhys (βασιλικός/γεωμετρικός πῆχυς)	2	0.625	lit. "forearm" The Public Cubit counted 24 daktyloi and was used mainly in construction, hence was also called lithikos ("stone"), [xylo]pristikos ("[wood]-sawing"), tektonikos ("builder's"). The Imperial or Geometric Cubit counted 32 daktyloi and was used for the measurement of fields for the purpose of tax assessment. Local variants also existed for various other commodities.
(Single) Pace	bêma haploûn (βῆμα ἁπλοῦν)	2 1/2	0.787	(=English pace)
Double pace	bêma diploûn (βῆμα διπλοῦν)	5	1.574	(=Roman pace)
Simple Orguia (Simple) Fathom	haplê orguiá (ἁπλὴ ὀργυιά)	6	1.87	Derived from the equivalent ancient Greek unit (1.89 m) From the 14th century on local variants also existed, often called kanna from the Italian canna.
Imperial or Geometric Orguia; Imperial or Geometric Fathom	basilikê/geômetrikê orguiá (βασιλικὴ/γεωμετρικὴ ὀργυιά)	6 3/4	2.10	9 spithamai = 108 daktyloi, used for the measurement of fields for the purpose of tax assessment. To ease the farmers' tax burden, Michael IV introduced a longer version of 9.25 spithamai (2.17 m) for use in middle and high quality, while the lower value was retained for poorer fields.
Perch	dekápodon (δεκάποδον)	10	3.148	lit. "decafoot: 10-foot [length]"
Schoinion	skhoinion (σχοινιον)	60; 72	21.30; 25.30	lit. "little schoenus" The basis of land tax assessments, variously reckoned as 10 fathoms in the fertile Balkan and west Anatolian themes and as 12 in the rest of Asia Minor.
Plethron	pléthron (πλέθρον)	100	31.48	The Greek furlong, one side of the ancient Greek acre Uncommon in Byzantine texts
Stade	stádion (στάδιον)	600	188.8	Also stadion or stadium (pl. stadia) (=English furlong)
Bowshot	doxarioú bolḗ (δοξαριού βολή)	1000	314.8	
Mile	mílion (μίλιον)	5000	1574	Also milion (=Roman mile)
Schoenus	skhoinos (σχοινος)	20000	6296	lit. "reed rope" 33 1/3 stades, against various (usually longer) classical values
Day's Journey	hodós hēméras (ὁδός ἡμέρας)	150000	47220	
Week's Journey	hodós sabbátou (ὁδός σαββάτου)	1050000	330540	
Source: Loizos, unless otherwise noted. Metric equivalents are approximate.

== Area ==
The ordinary units used for land measurement were Greek.

Units of area
Unit	Greek name	square Greek feet	square meters	Notes
(Square) Pous (square foot)	poûs (ποῦς)	1	0.095	
Stremma	strémma (στρέμμα)	10000	991	lit. "turning" Sometimes described as a (square) "plethron", although this is uncommon in Byzantine texts The ancient Greek acre, originally defined by the distance plowed by a team of oxen in a day and continuing to vary according to land quality under the Byzantines between 900 and 1900 m^{2}
Modios; Zeugarion	módios (μόδιος) zeugárion (ζευγάριον)	30000	2973	Highly variable. Modioi were sometimes much smaller units that might come 100 or 250 to a single zeugarion. The "Modion" was originally a grain measure, and "zeugarion" referred to a yoke.
Source: Loizos, unless otherwise noted. Metric equivalents are approximate.

== Volume ==
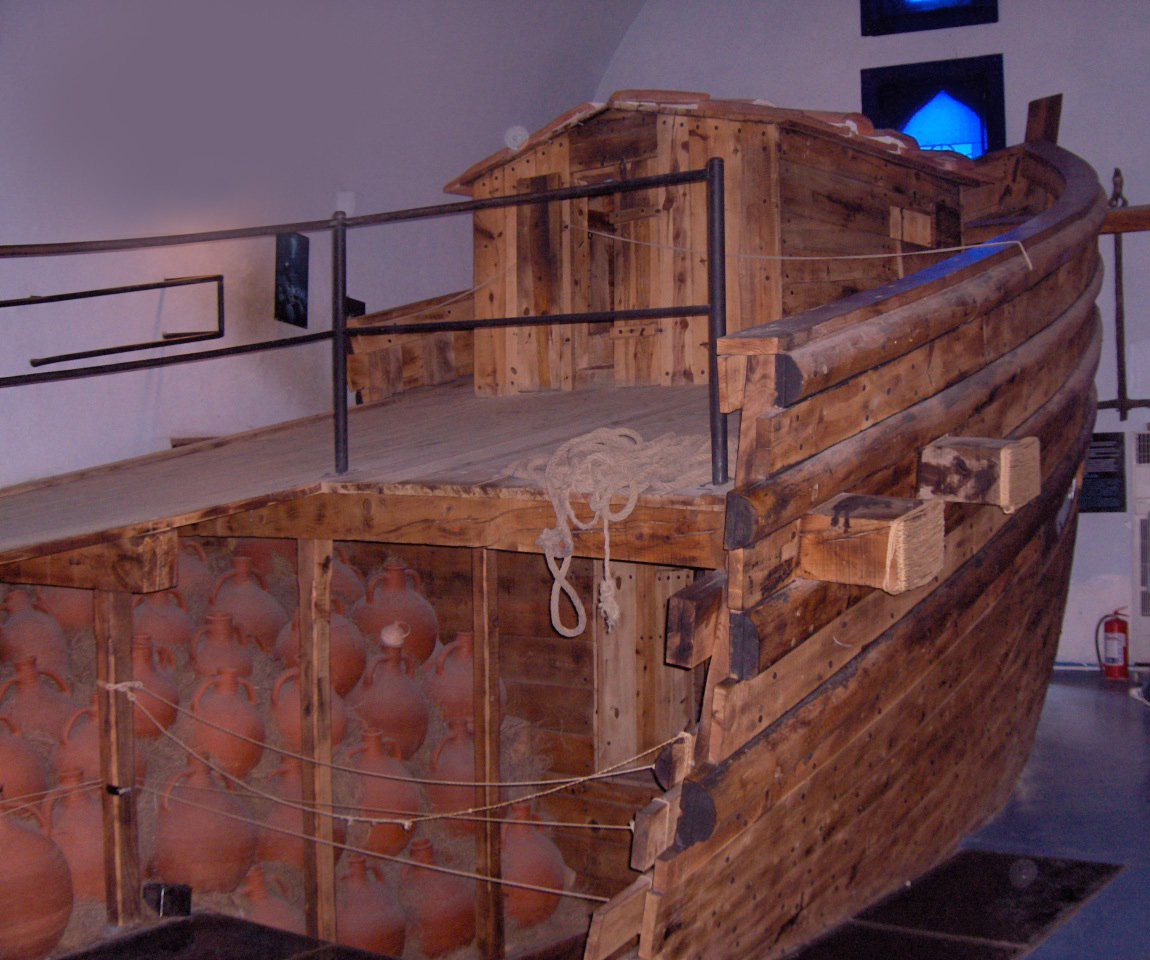
The Yassiada reconstruction in Bodrum's Museum of Underwater Archaeology, loaded with replica Byzantine amphorae

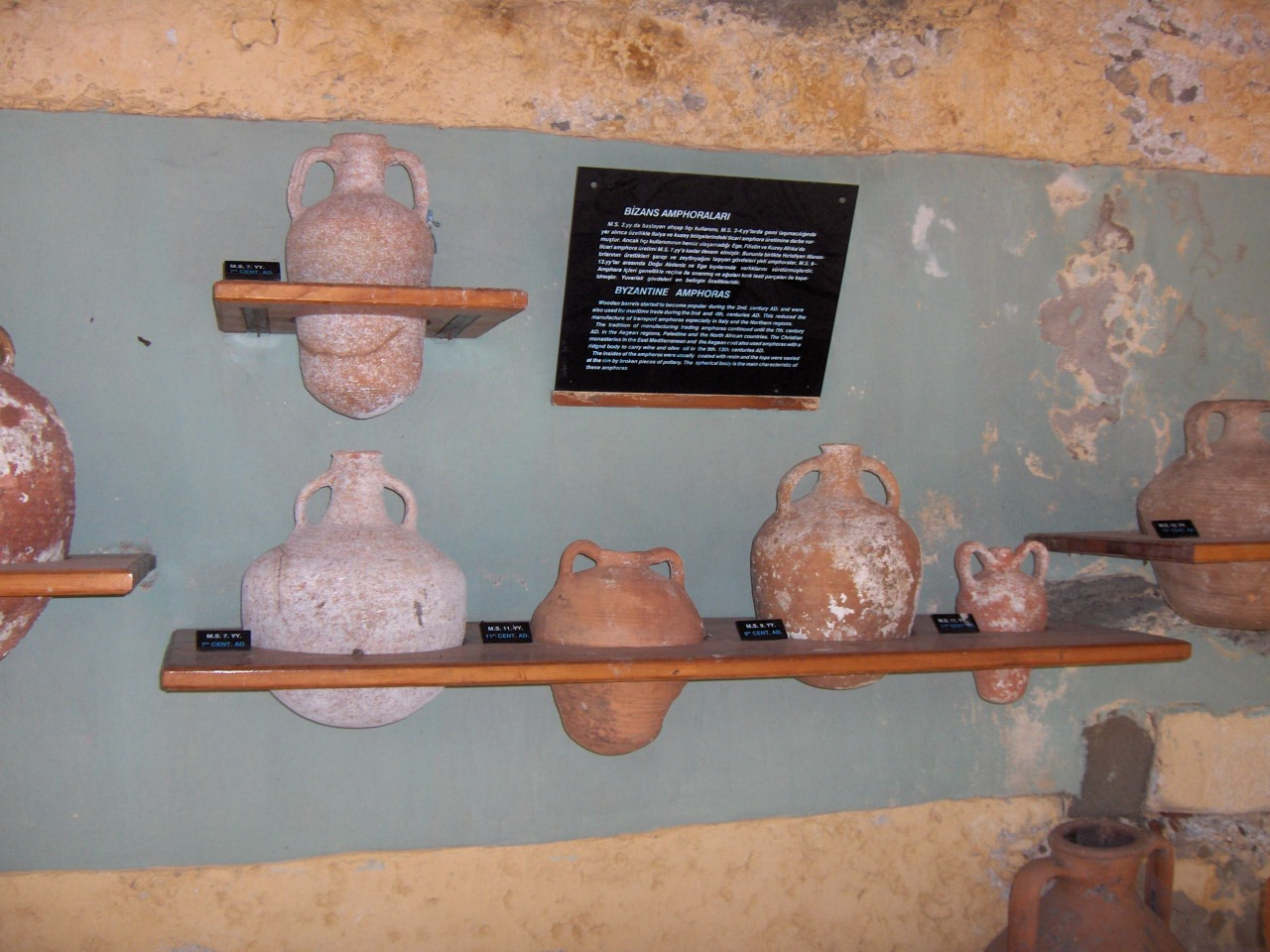
The museum's display of Byzantine amphorae styles

The ordinary units used for liquid measurement were mostly Roman:

Units of volume
Unit	Greek name	Litras	liters	Notes
(Liquid) Ounce	ouggía (οὐγγία) ogkía (ὀγκία) ougkía (οὐγκία)	1/12	0.1824	(=Roman uncia)
Cotyla; Half-xesta	kotýlē (κοτύλη) hēmixéstion (ἡμιξέστιον)	1/8	0.276	(=Roman half-sextarius)
Xesta	xéstēs (ξέστης)	1/4	0.548	(=Roman sextarius)
(Liquid) Litra (Liter)	lítra (λίτρα)	1	2.1888	(=Roman libra)
Handful	phoûkta (φοῦκτα)	1 13/24	3.367	
(Liquid) Modios	módios (μόδιος)	40	87.552	
Source: Loizos, unless otherwise noted. Metric equivalents are approximate.

== Weight ==
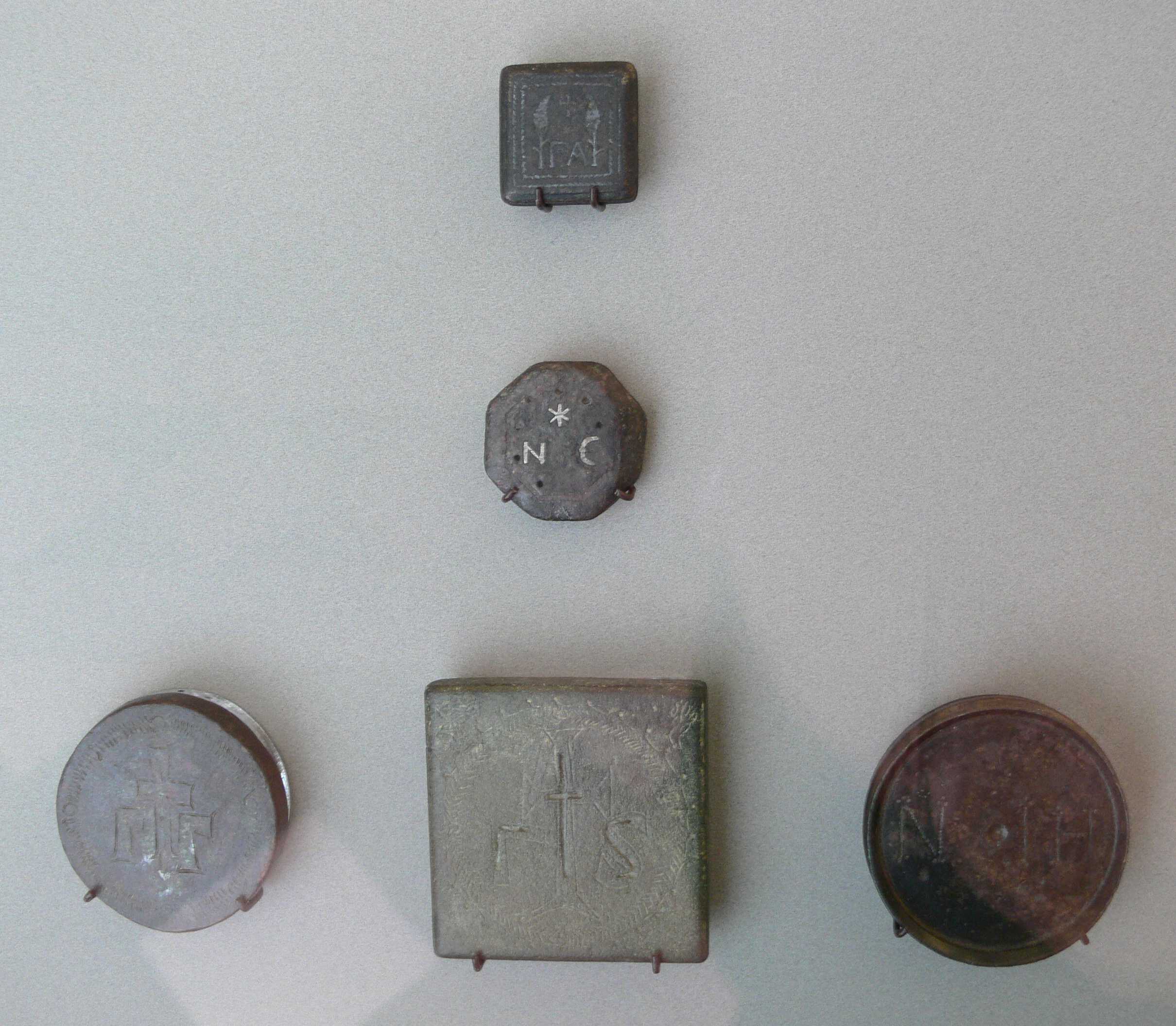
Five bronze commodity weights

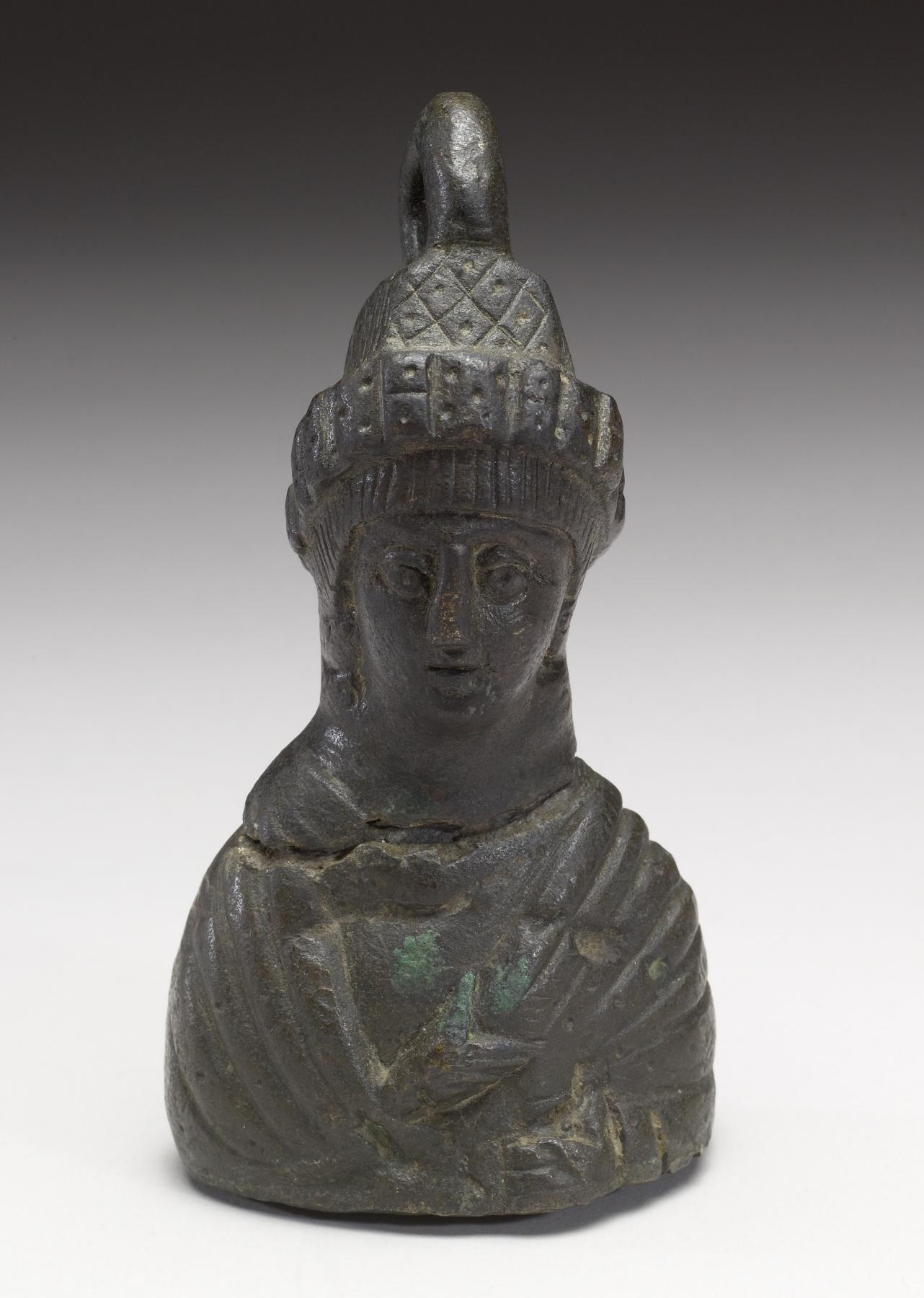
Bronze steelyard weights were often in the shape of a Byzantine empress.

The ordinary units used for measurement of weight or mass were mostly Roman, based on the late Roman pound. This has been reconstructed on the basis of known legislation of Constantine the Great in AD 309 establishing 72 gold solidi (Ancient Greek: νόμισμα, nómisma) to the pound. As the early solidi weighed 4.55 g, the pound was therefore 0.3276 kg at the time. The solidus was repeatedly debased, however, implying average pounds of 0.324 kg (4th–6th century), 0.322 kg (6th–7th century), 0.320 kg (7th–9th century), 0.319 kg (9th–13th century), and even less thereafter.

Model weights were made in lead, bronze, and glass and (less often) from gold and silver. They came in various styles. Presently, archaeologists believe the bronze spheres sliced flat at top and bottom and marked with an omicron/upsilon date from the early 3rd to late 5th centuries, gradually being replaced by cubes marked with a gamma/omicron (𐆄) over the course of the 4th century. In the second half of the 6th century, these were replaced by discs until at least the early 9th century and possibly the 12th. The glass weights had numerous advantages in manufacture and use but seem to have disappeared following the loss of the empire's Syrian and Egyptian provinces in the 7th century.

Analysis of the thousands of surviving model weights strongly suggest multiple local weight standards in the Byzantine Empire before the Arab conquests. Under Justinian, the weights of currency were administered by the comes sacrarum largitionum and commodity weights by the praetorian prefect and eparch of the city. (Note: Code of Justinian, Novel 128, Ch. 15.) By the 9th century, the eparch nominally controlled all official weights in Constantinople, although archaeology has shown others issued their own weights, including proconsuls, viri laudabiles, and viri clarissimi in the west and anthypatoi, counts, and ephors in the east.

Units of weight
Unit	Greek name	Greek ounces	grams	Notes
Scruple	gramma (γραμμα) trēmísis (τρημίσις)	1/24	1.55	
Semissis	sēmísis (σημίσις)	1/12	2.27	
Nomisma	nómisma (νόμισμα)	1/6	4.55	
Ounce	ouggía (οὐγγία) ogkía (ὀγκία) ougkía (οὐγκία)	1	27.3	(=Roman uncia)
Litra (Pound)	lítra (λίτρα)	12	327.6	Value c. 309, but diminishing over time. (=Roman pound)
Source: Loizos, unless otherwise noted. Metric equivalents are approximate.

== See also ==
- Greek units
- Roman units
