= Pace count beads =

Manual counting tool

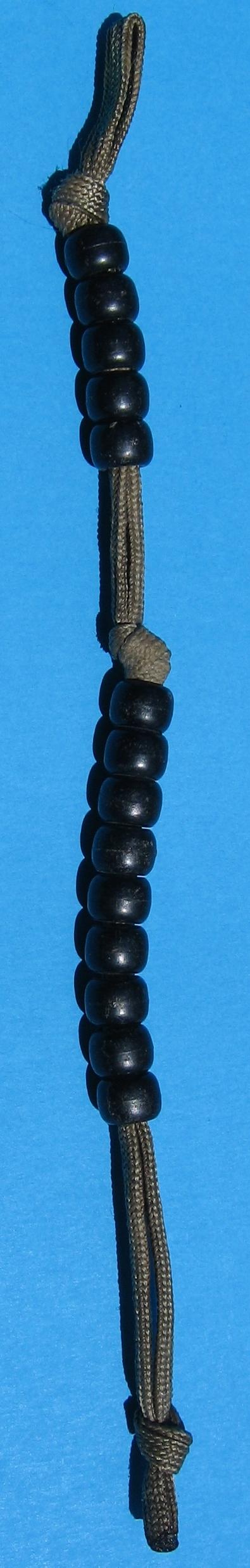
Pace count beads

Pace count beads, pacer beads or ranger beads are a manual counting tool used to keep track of distance traveled through a pace count. It is used in military land navigation or orienteering. Stringed beads found at stoneage sites in Africa may have been used for pace counting, and modified Japamala have been used to keep pace. A typical example for military use is keeping track of distance traveled during a foot patrol.

== Description ==
The tool is usually constructed using a set of about 13 beads on a length of cord. The beads are divided into two sections, separated by a knot. Nine beads are used in the lower section, and four (or in some cases more) beads are used in the upper section. There is often a loop in the upper end, making it possible to attach the tool to the user's gear with a simple Larks head hitch.

== Usage ==
The beads can be used to count paces or a distance calculated from the number of paces. Both methods require the user to know the relationship between the paces walked, and the distance traveled. There are two main ways to use the beads. One is to represent the distance a person has walked, and the other is to represent the distance they need to walk. In the latter, beads may be used to count down the distance to a destination.

=== Counting paces ===
As users walk, they typically slide one bead on the cord for every ten paces taken. On the tenth pace, the user slides a bead in the lower section towards the knot. After the 90th pace, all nine beads are against the knot. On the 100th pace, all nine beads in the lower section are returned away from the knot, and a bead from the upper section is slid upwards, away from the knot.

In this manner, the user calculates the distance traveled by keeping track of the paces taken. To use this method, the user must know the length of their pace to calculate the distance accurately traveled. Also, the number of paces to be walked must be precalculated (example: 2,112 paces= one mile, based on a 30-inch pace), and then the distance traveled has to be calculated from the walked paces.

=== Distance walked ===
For every 100 meters the user walks, one of the lower beads is pulled down. When the ninth of the lower beads is pulled, the user has walked 900 meters. When the user has walked 1000 meters, one of the upper beads is pulled down, and all the lower beads are pulled back up.

Using this method, the user must know the number of paces walked in 100 meters. An experienced user can also adapt the pace count for each hundred meter depending on the terrain. When using this method, the user does not have to calculate distance from the number of paces.

This method can be used for non-metric distances as well, though with the beads arranged in a different manner.

The United States Army stated in its field manual on Map Reading and Land Navigation that, "there are many methods to keep track of distance traveled", including placing pebbles in your pockets or tying knots on a string. Pace count beads are generally not issued in the United States Military, thus soldiers and Marines typically make their own or purchase them from an equipment supply company.
