= Pous =

Ancient Greek unit of length; approximately 300mm or 12 inches

The pous (pl. podes; Ancient Greek: πούς, poús) or Greek foot (pl. feet) was a Greek unit of length of approximately 300mm or 12 inches. It had various subdivisions whose lengths varied by place and over time. 100 podes made up one plethron, 600 podes made up a stade (the Greek furlong) and 5000 made up a milion (the Greek mile). The Greek pous also has long, median and short forms.

The pous spread throughout much of Europe and the Middle East during the Hellenic period preceding and following the conquests of Alexander the Great and remained in use as a Byzantine unit until the Fall of Constantinople in 1453.

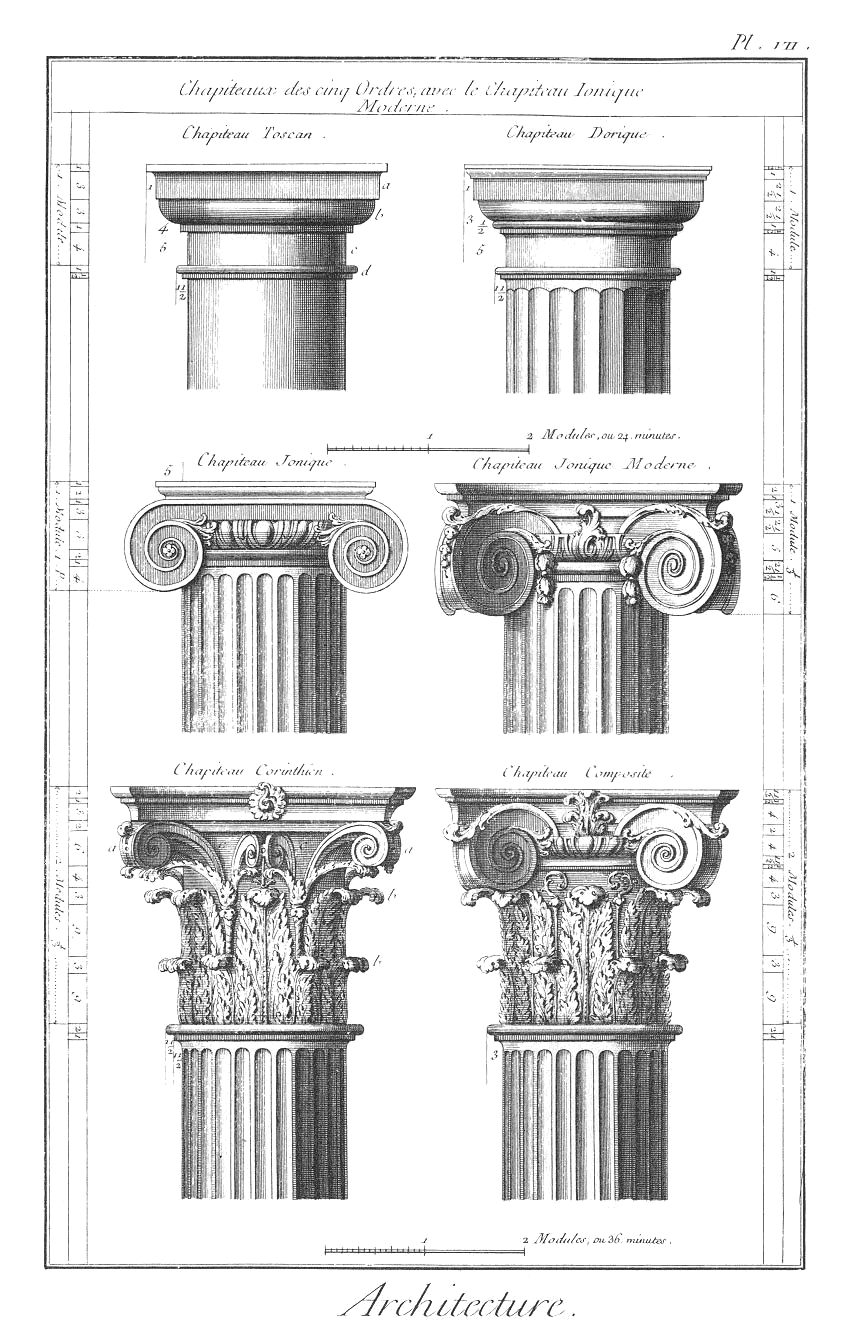
Orders of Architecture

== Comparative analysis ==
A pous is divided into digits or fingers (daktyloi) which are multiplied as shown. Generally the sexagesimal or decimal multiples have Mesopotamian origins while the septenary multiples have Egyptian origins.

Greek measures of short median and long podes can be thought of as based on body measures. The lengths may be compared to the Imperial/U.S. foot of 304.8 mm. Stecchini and others propose the Greek podes are different sizes because they are divided into different numbers of different sized daktylos to facilitate different calculations. The most obvious place to observe the relative difference is in the Greek orders of architecture whose canon of proportions is based on column diameters.

Unit	no. of daktyloi	each daktylos (mm)	total (mm)	inches
1 Doric order pous (foot)	18	18	324 mm	12.755905511811
1 Luwian pous (foot)	17	19	323 mm	12.71654
1 Attic pous (foot)	16	19.275	308.4 mm	12.14173
1 Minoan pous (foot)	16	19	304 mm	11.9685
1 Egyptian bd (foot)	16	18.75	300 mm	11.81102
1 Ionian Order pous (foot)	16	18.5	296 mm	11.65354
1 Roman pes (foot)	16	18.5	296 mm	11.65354
1 Athenian pous (foot)	15	21	315 mm	12.40157
1 Phoenician (Pele) pous (foot)	15	20	300 mm	11.81102
