= List of human-based units of measurement =

Units of measurement based on human body lengths

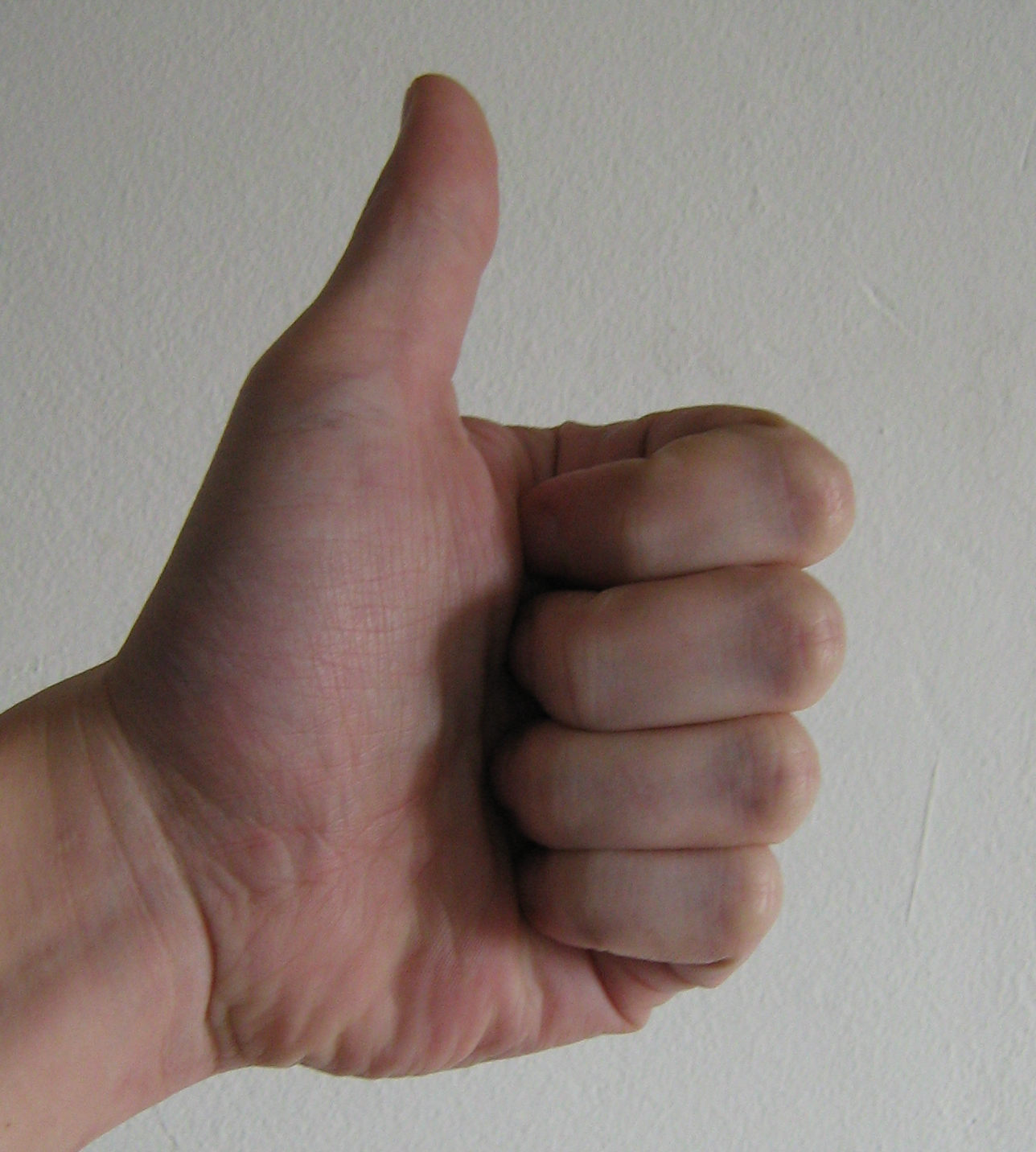
Lichas - thumb length

This is a list of units of measurement based on human body parts or the attributes and abilities of humans (anthropometric units). It does not include derived units further unless they are also themselves human-based. These units are thus considered to be human scale and anthropocentric. A cross-cultural review of body-based measurement systems has found such units to be ubiquitous worldwide.

== Area ==
- Morgen - the area that one man could plow from morning to noon.
- Quinaria - the cross-sectional area of a pipe created from a flat sheet of lead 5 digits wide.
- Stremma - the amount of land a person can plow in a day.

== Length ==
=== Arms ===
- Cubit - length of the human forearm.
  - Amah - Biblical ell.
  - Arş - Turkish cubit.
  - Arsh - Arabic cubit
  - Cubitus - Ancient Roman cubit
  - Ell
  - Elle - German ell
  - Macedonian cubit
  - Pēchys - Ancient Greek cubit

=== Feet ===
- Foot - length of the human foot
  - Arabic foot
  - Fuß - German foot
  - Russian fut - Russian foot
  - Tatar fut - Tatar foot
  - Pes - Roman foot
  - Pous - Greek foot

=== Fingers ===
- Finger
  - Assbā - Arabic finger
  - Condylos - middle joint of finger
  - Cun - width of the human thumb, at the knuckle
  - Dactylos - Ancient Greek finger breadth
  - Digit - length of a human finger
  - Digitus - Ancient Roman digit
  - Etzba - fingerbreadth

=== Forearms ===
- Pygmē - distance from elbow to base of fingers

=== Hands ===
- Hand - breadth of a human hand
  - Fistmele - the measure of a clenched hand with the thumb extended
  - Shaftment - width of the fist and outstretched thumb
  - Span - width of a human hand, from the tip of the thumb to the tip of the little finger
  - Spithamē - Ancient Greek span
  - Zeret - Biblical span

=== Inches ===
- Inch - width of the thumb (by some definitions)
  - Duym - Tatar thumb/inch
  - Uncia - Roman inch
  - Zoll - German inch

=== Paces ===
- Pace - a full stride, from heel to heel
  - Gradus - Ancient Roman step
  - Haploun bēma - Ancient Greek single pace
  - Orgye - Arabic pace
  - Passus - the pace step of a single legionary

=== Palms ===
- Palm - breadth of four fingers
  - Cabda - Arabic palm
  - Chetvert/Piad - Russian span/palm
  - Palaistē/dōron - Ancient Greek palm
  - Palmus - Ancient Roman palm
  - Tefah/Tefach - Biblical palm

=== Outstretched arms ===
- Fathom - the distance between the fingertips of a human's outstretched arms
  - Ald - the distance between a man's outstretched arms
  - Klafter - German measure of outstretched hands
  - Orgyia - Ancient Greek fathom
  - Sazhen - Russian fathom

=== Walking distances ===
- League - the distance a person can walk in an hour (by one definition)
- Parasang - the distance an infantryman could march in a predefined period of time

=== Others ===
- Smoot - a humorous unit of length created as part of an MIT fraternity pledge

== Loudness ==
- Phon
- Sone

== Mass ==
- Picul - the weight a person can carry

== Time ==
- Nimesha - the time it takes for a person to blink
- Paramanu - interval of blinking in humans

== Volume ==
- Choenix - a man's daily grain ration.
- Finger tip unit.
- Koku - the amount of rice needed to feed a person for a year.
- Japanese masu - the amount of rice needed to feed a person for a day.
- Hathy - Arabic unit for amount of sand or water collected in a one-hand swipe.

== Miscellaneous ==
- Garn - unit of measure for symptoms resulting from space adaptation syndrome; equal to complete incapacitation; named for Jake Garn.

== See also ==
- Ancient Mesopotamian units of length
- Anthropic units § In measurement, human scale units
- Bhojpuri units of measurement
- Anthropometry – Measurement of the human individual
- German obsolete units of measurement
- History of measurement
- Persian units of measurement
- Swedish units of measurement
- Units of measurement
- Units of measurement in France before the French Revolution
