= Thai units of measurement =

System of units traditionally used in Thailand

Before metrication, the traditional system of measurement used in Thailand employed anthropic units. Some of these units are still in use, albeit standardised to SI/metric measurements. When the Royal Thai Survey Department began cadastral survey in 1896, Director R. W. Giblin, F.R.G.S., noted, "It so happens that 40 metres or 4,000 centimetres are equal to one sen," so all cadastral plans are plotted, drawn, and printed to a scale of 1:4,000. The square wa, ngan and rai are still used in measurements of land area.

The baht is still used as a unit of measurement in gold trading. However, one baht of 96.5% gold bullion is defined as 15.16 grams rather than the generic standard of 15 grams. The baht has also become the name of the currency of Thailand, which was originally fixed to the corresponding mass of silver.

== List of units ==
Unit	Thai script	IPA pronunciation	Meaning equivalent	Relative equivalent	Metric equivalent
Length
Krabiat	กระเบียด	[krā.bìat̚]	Quarter of a finger		0.5208 cm
Nio	นิ้ว	[níw]	Siamese inch Cf. Digit (unit) finger (unit)	4 krabiat	2.083 cm
Khuep	คืบ	[kʰɯ̂ːp̚]	Span	12 nio	25 cm
Sok	ศอก	[sɔ̀ːk̚]	Cubit	2 khuep	50 cm
Wa	วา	[wāː]	Fathom (outstretched arms)	4 sok	2 m
Sen	เส้น	[sên]	Cf. Rope (unit) line of rope Chain (unit)	20 wa	40 m
Yot	โยชน์	[jôːt̚]	Yojana	400 sen	16 km
Area
Tarang wa	ตารางวา	[tāː.rāːŋ wāː]	Square wa		4 m^{2}
Ngan	งาน	[ŋāːn]	Work	100 tarang wa	400 m^{2}
Rai	ไร่	[râj]	Plantation	4 ngan 1 Square sen	1,600 m^{2} (16 a)
Volume
Yip mue	หยิบมือ	[jìp mɯ̄ː]	Pinch		7.8125 mL
Kam mue	กำมือ	[kām mɯ̄ː]	Grain held in an enclosed hand	4 yip mue	31.25 mL
Fai mue	ฟายมือ	[fāːj mɯ̄ː]	Grain held in the palm	4 kam mue	125 mL
Thanan	ทะนาน	[tʰā.nāːn]	Coconut shell used for measuring	8 fai mue	1 L
Thang	ถัง	[tʰǎŋ]	Bucket	20 thanan	20 L
Sat	สัด	[sàt̚]	Measuring basket	25 thanan	25 L
Kwian	เกวียน	[kwīan]	Cartload	100 thang	2 m^{3}
Weight/mass
Salueng	สลึง	[sā.lɯ̌ŋ]			3.75 g
Baht or Bat	บาท	[bàːt̚]	Tical	4 salueng	15 g
Tamlueng	ตำลึง	[tām.lɯ̄ŋ]	Tael	4 baht	60 g
Chang	ชั่ง	[t͡ɕʰâŋ]	Catty	20 tamlueng	1,200 g
Hap	หาบ	[hàːp̚]	Picul	50 chang	60 kg
