= Myanmar units of measurement =

System of measurements formerly used in Myanmar

The traditional Burmese units of measurement is a system of measurement used in Myanmar.

Myanmar was one of three countries that had not adopted the International System of Units (SI) metric system as their official system of weights and measures according to the 2010 CIA Factbook. However, in June 2011, U Kyaw Htoo from the Myanmar government's Ministry of Commerce began discussing proposals to reform the measurement system in Myanmar and adopt the kilogram for domestic trade, reasoning that this would simplify foreign trade which it conducts exclusively in metric; and in October 2013, Pwint San, Deputy Minister for Commerce, announced that the country was preparing to adopt the metric system.

As of 2008, the traditional unit of measurement, 'basket', remains widely used in Myanmar's agriculture production.

== Length ==
Table of length units
Unit		Metric	Imperial/US	Ratio to previous
Burmese	Romanized	Metric	Imperial/US	Ratio to previous
ဆံချည်	hsanchi	79.375 μm	3 1/8 thou/mil	
နှမ်း	hnan	793.75 μm	31 1/4 thou/mil	10
မုယော	muyaw	4.7625 mm	3/16 in	6
လက်သစ်	let thit	19.05 mm	3/4 in; one digit	4
မိုက်	maik (from Pali muṭhi)	152.4 mm	6 in; one shaftment	8
ထွာ	htwa	228.6 mm	9 in; one span	1.5
တောင်	taung	457.2 mm	1 1/2 ft; one cubit	2
လံ	lan	1.8288 m	6 ft; one fathom	4
တာ	ta	3.2004 m	10 1/2 ft	1.75
ဥသဘ	out-thaba (from Pali usabha)	64.008 m	70 yd	20
ကောသ	kawtha (from Pali kosa)	1.28016 km	0.795455 mi	20
ဂါဝုတ်	ga-wout (from Pali gāvuta)	5.12064 km	3.18182 mi; about one league	4
ယူဇနာ	yuzana (from Pali yūjanā)	20.48256 km	12.7273 mi	4

== Mass ==
Table of mass units
Unit		Metric	Imperial/US	Ratio to previous
Burmese	Romanized	Metric	Imperial/US	Ratio to previous
ရွေးလေး	yway lay	136.078 mg	2.1 grain	
ရွေးကြီး	yway gyi	272.155 mg	4.2 grain	2
ပဲသား	petha	1.02058 g	15.75 grain	3.75
မူးသား	mutha	2.04117 g	31.5 grain	2
မတ်သား	mattha	4.08233 g	63 grain	2
ငါးမူးသား	nga mutha (Note: Literally "five mutha", but in fact it is only four.)	8.16466 g	0.288 oz	2
ကျပ်သား	kyattha (Note: Traditionally known as a tical in English.)	16.3293 g	0.576 oz	2
အဝက်သား	awettha	204.117 g	7.2 oz	12.5
အစိတ်သား	aseittha	408.233 g	14.4 oz	2
ငါးဆယ်သား	ngase tha	816.466 g	1.8 lb	2
ပိဿာ	peittha (Note: Traditionally known as a viss in English.)	1.63293 kg	3.6 lb	2
အချိန်တစ်ရာ	achein taya	163.293 kg	360 lb	100

== Volume ==
Table of volume units
Unit		Metric	Imperial	US	Ratio to previous
Burmese	Romanized	Metric	Imperial	US	Ratio to previous
လမြူ	la myu	79.9118 mL	2 13/16 fl oz	2 .70214 fl oz	
လမျက်	la myet	159.824 mL	5 5/8 fl oz	5.40428 fl oz	2
လမယ်	la me	319.647 mL	11 1/4 fl oz	10.8086 fl oz	2
စလယ်	sa le	639.294 mL	1 1/8 pints	1.35107 pints	2
ခွက် (Note: The terms khwe (half), seit (quarter), sayut (eighth), pyi (16th) and khwet (32nd) denote fractional units for land and volume measurements. For example, for land area, a sayut represents one-eighth of a pe (~0.7 hectare; ~1.75 acres). In volumetric measurements, a sayut represents one-eighth of a tin (basket). See (Zata 1960: 31) for the use of sayut and khwet as area measurements in conjunction with min pe (royal pe).)	hkwet / khwet	1.27859 L	1 1/8 qt	1.35107 qt	2
ပြည်	pyi	2.55718 L	2 1/4 qt	2.70214 qt	2
စရွတ် (archaic)	sayut	5.11435 L	4 1/2 qt	5.4043 qt	2
စိတ်	seit	10.2287 L	2 1/4 gallons 1 1/8 pecks	2.70214 gallons 1.16106 pecks	2
ခွဲ	hkwe / khwe	20.4574 L	4 1/2 gallons 2 1/4 pecks	5.40428 gallons 2.32213 pecks	2
တင်း	tin	40.9148 L	9 gallons 1 1/8 bushels	10.8086 gallons 1.16107 bushels	2

== Money ==
Table of money units
Unit		Equivalent to				
Burmese	Romanized	pya	mu	mat	nga mu	kyat
ပြား	1 pya	1	1/10	1/25	1/50	1/100
မူး	1 mu	10	1	2/5	1/5	1/10
မတ်	1 mat	25	2 1/2	1	1/2	1/4
ငါးမူး	5 mu (nga mu)	50	5	2	1	1/2
ကျပ်	1 kyat	100	10	4	2	1

== Adoption of SI (metric) system ==
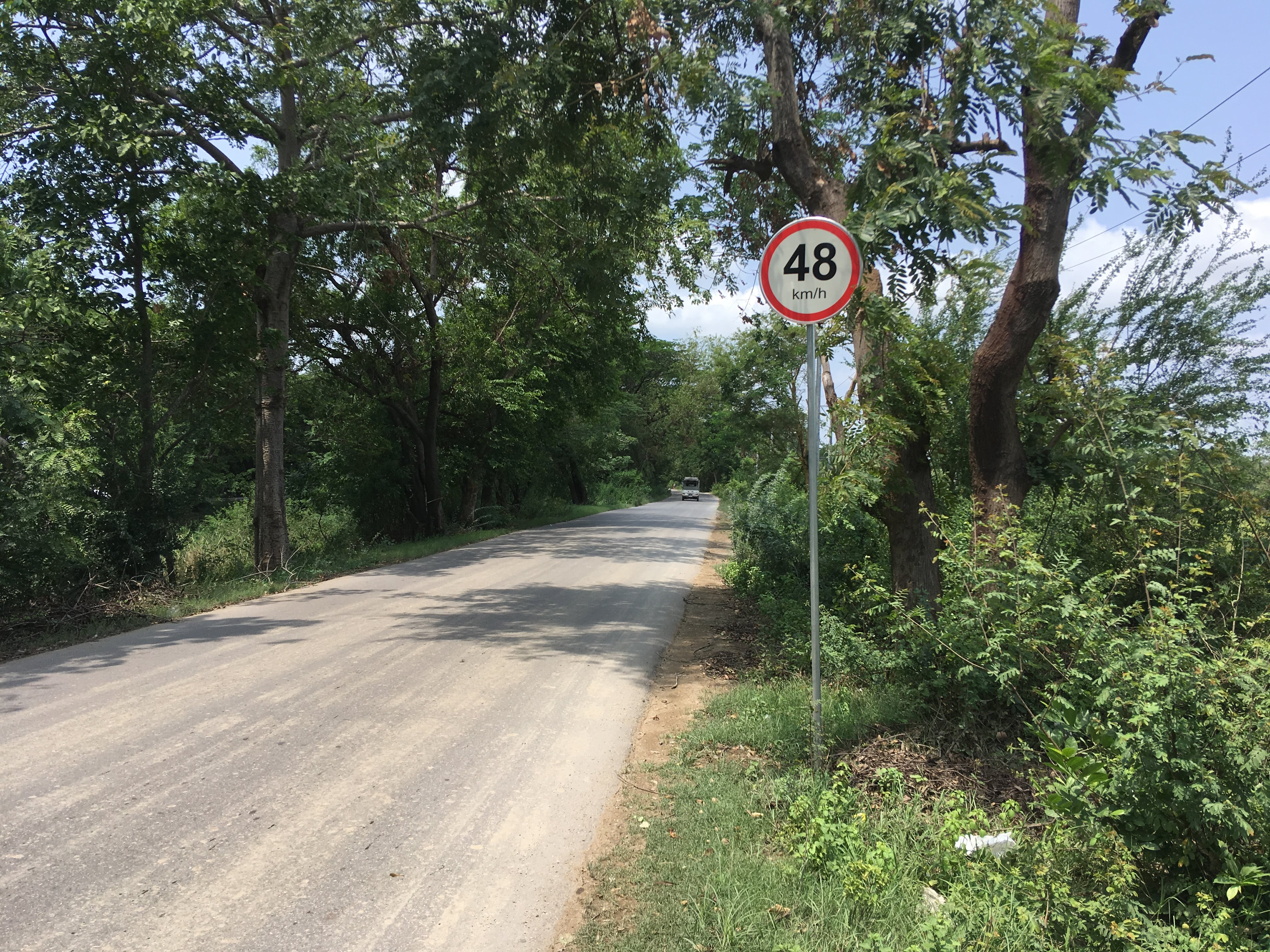
Speed limit road sign using kilometres per hour in Amarapura. 30 miles per hour is approximately equal to 48 kilometres per hour.

In October 2013, the Ministry of Commerce announced that Myanmar was preparing to adopt the International System of Units (SI) as the country's official system of measurement.

Examples of metrication in Myanmar include weather forecasts by the Department of Meteorology and Hydrology being given with temperatures in Celsius. Petrol in Myanmar is sold with prices in Burmese kyat per litre (K/L). Speed limits in Myanmar are given by law in kilometres per hour (km/h).

== See also ==
- Myanmar
- Burmese alphabet
- Burmese language

== Bibliography ==
- "Myanmar, Metric and British equivalents in weights & measures". Myanmar–English Dictionary. Department of the Myanmar Language Commission, Ministry of Education, Union of Myanmar.
- Frasch, Tilman (2008). Measuring Burmese Soil: Some Little-known Words and Practices. Paris.
- Royal Historians of Burma (1960) [c. 1680]. U Hla Tin (Hla Thamein) (ed.). Zatadawbon Yazawin. Rangoon: Historical Research Directorate of the Union of Burma.
- Stewart, J.A. (April 1921). "Kyaukse Irrigation—A Side-light on Burmese History". The Journal of the Burma Research Society. 11 (1). Rangoon: 1–4.
