= Palm (unit) =

Anthropic unit of length, based on the width of the human palm

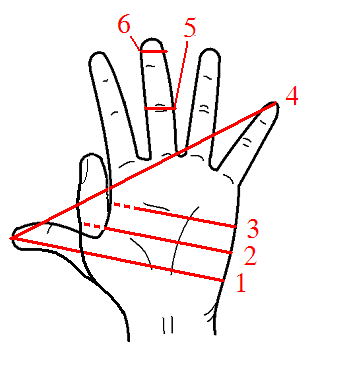
A diagram of various units derived from the human hand. The palm (3) was originally the width of the palm but was standardized as the somewhat smaller width of four digits (6). The related shaftment (1) and hand (2) were the width of the palm plus an open or closed thumb. The other units are the span (4) and finger (5).

The palm is an obsolete anthropic unit of length, originally based on the width of the human palm and then variously standardized. The same name is also used for a second, rather larger unit based on the length of the human hand.

The width of the palm was a traditional unit in Ancient Egypt, Israel, Greece, and Rome and in medieval England, where it was also known as the hand, (Note: Over time, the hand has developed into a separate unit now used especially for measuring the height of horses. This hand, including the width of the thumb, is reckoned as 4 inches or 102 millimeters.) handbreadth, or handsbreadth. (Note: In present usage, a "handbreadth" or "handsbreadth" is no longer taken as a proper unit but as a simple vague reckoning based on the human hand.)

The length of the hand—originally the Roman "greater palm"—formed the palm of medieval Italy and France. In Spanish customary units palmo menor or coto was the palm, while palmo was the span, the distance between an outstretched thumb and little finger. In Portuguese palmo or palmo de craveira was the span.

== History ==
=== Ancient Egypt ===
D48
Palm (D48)
in hieroglyphs

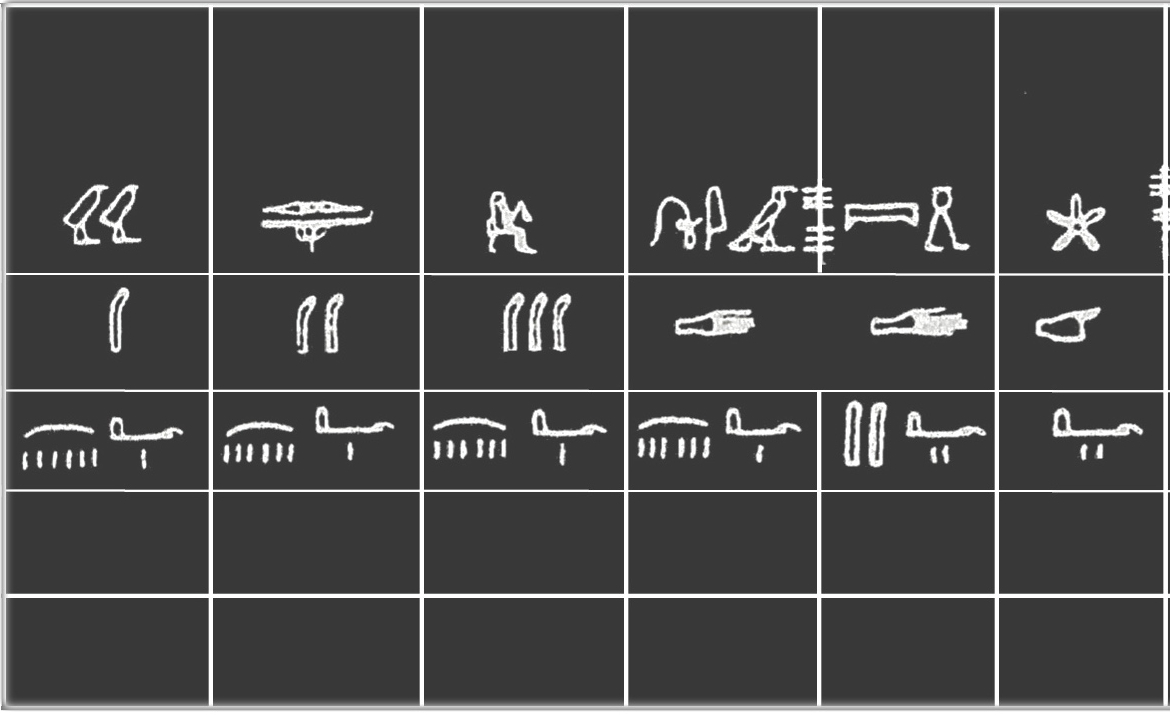
Detail of the cubit rod in the Museo Egizio of Turin, showing digit, palm, hand and fist lengths

The Ancient Egyptian palm (Ancient Egyptian: shesep) has been reconstructed as about 75 mm or 3 in. (Note: More specifically, the 14 cubit-rods described by Lepsius in 1865 show a range from 74.7–75.6 mm (2.94–2.98 in).) The unit is attested as early as the reign of Djer, third pharaoh of the First Dynasty, and appears on many surviving cubit-rods.

The palm was subdivided into four digits (djeba) of about 19 mm (0.75 in).

Three palms made up the span (pedj) or lesser span (pedj-sheser) of about 22.5 cm (9 in). Four palms made up the foot (djeser) of about 30 cm (1 ft). Five made up the remen of about 37.5 cm (1 ft 3 in). Six made up the "Greek cubit" (meh nedjes) of about 45 cm (1 ft 6 in). Seven made up the "royal cubit" (meh niswt) of about 52.5 cm (1 ft 9 in). Eight made up the pole (nbiw) of about 60 cm (2 ft).

=== Ancient Israel ===
The palm was not a major unit in ancient Mesopotamia but appeared in ancient Israel as the tefah, tepah, or topah (Hebrew: טפח, lit. "a spread"). Scholars were long uncertain as to whether this was reckoned using the Egyptian or Babylonian cubit, but now believe it to have approximated the Egyptian "Greek cubit", giving a value for the palm of about 74 mm or 2.9 in.

As in Egypt, the palm was divided into four digits (etzba or etsba) of about 18.5 mm (0.73 in) and three palms made up a span (zeret) of about 22.1 cm (9 in). Six made up the Hebrew cubit (amah or ammah) of about 44.3 cm (1 ft 5 in), although the cubits mentioned in Ezekiel follow the royal cubit in consisting of seven palms comprising about 51.8 centimeters (1 ft 8 in).

=== Ancient Greece ===
The Ancient Greek palm (Ancient Greek: παλαιστή, palaistḗ, δῶρον, dō̂ron, or δακτυλοδόχμη, daktylodókhmē) made up ¼ of the Greek foot (poûs), which varied by region between 27–35 cm (11 in – 1 ft 2 in). This gives values for the palm between 6.7–8.8 cm (2.6–3.5 in), with the Attic palm around 7.4 cm (2.9 in).

These various palms were divided into four digits (dáktylos) or two "middle phalanges" (kóndylos). Two palms made a half-foot (hēmipódion or dikhás); three, a span (spithamḗ); four, a foot (poûs); five, a short cubit (pygōn); and six, a cubit (pē̂khys).

The Greeks also had a less common "greater palm" of five digits.

=== Ancient Rome ===
The Roman palm (Latin: palmus) or lesser palm (palmus minor) made up ¼ of the Roman foot (pes), which varied in practice between 29.2–29.7 cm (11.5–11.7 in) but is thought to have been officially 29.6 cm (11.7 in). This would have given the palm a notional value of 7.4 cm (2.9 in) within a range of a few millimeters.

The palm was divided into four digits (digitus) of about 1.85 cm (0.7 in) or three inches (uncia) of about 2.47 cm (1.0 in). Three made a span (palmus maior or "greater palm") of about 22.2 cm (9 in); (Note: Despite the equality of this unit with other systems' spans, the Encyclopédie glossed the "greater palm" as the length rather than the breadth of the hand.) four, a Roman foot; five, a hand-and-a-foot (palmipes) of about 37 cm (1 ft 3 in); six, a cubit (cubitus) of about 44.4 cm (1 ft 5.5 in).

=== Continental Europe ===
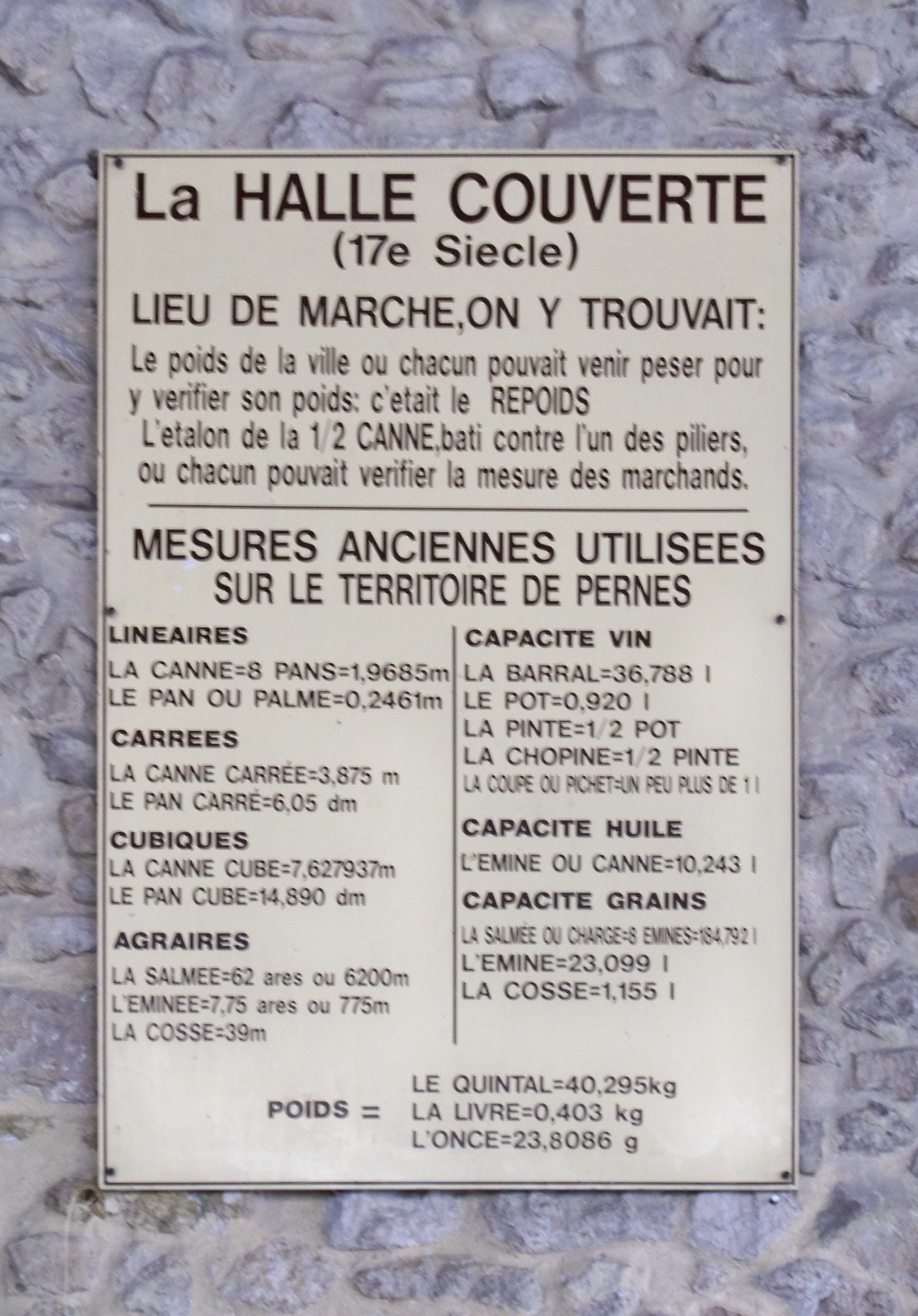
Sign giving the metric equivalents of the units in use in the 17th century in the covered market of Pernes-les-Fontaines in the Vaucluse

The palms of medieval (Latin: palma) and early modern Europe—the Italian, Spanish, and Portuguese palmo and French palme—were based upon the Roman "greater palm", reckoned as a hand's span or length.

In Italy, the palm (Italian: palmo) varied regionally. The Genovese palm was about 24.76–24.85 cm (9.7–9.8 in); (Note: Unlike Greaves, who used the Guildhall standard foot, Hutton based his measurements on the fractured yard at the Exchequer, about 1% of an inch shorter than the present yard. Hutton's line is reckoned as the 1/12th part of an inch.) in the Papal States, the Roman palm about 21.05 cm (8.3 in) according to Hutton but divided into the Roman "architect's palm" (palmo di architetti) of about 22.32 cm (8.8 in) and "merchant's palm" (palmo del braccio di mercantia) of about 21.21 cm (8.4 in) according to Greaves; (Note: A sign in Vaucluse, France, claims the Roman palm was identical to its own 24.61 cm (9.7 in) standard.) and the Neapolitan palm reported as 20.31 cm (8.0 in) by Riccioli but 21.80 cm (8.6 in) by Hutton's other sources. On Sicily and Malta, it was 24.61 cm (9.7 in).

In France, the palm (French: palme or pan) was about 24.61 cm (9.7 in) in Pernes-les-Fontaines, Vaucluse, and about 24.76 cm (9.7 in) in Languedoc.

Palaiseau gave metric equivalents for the palme or palmo in 1816, and Rose provided English equivalents in 1900:

Length of a palm in European cities
City	Lignes	Metric equivalent	Inches
Florence (for silk, Palaiseau p.146)	131.63	[297] mm	
Florence (for wool, Palaiseau p.146)	128.38	289.6 mm	
Genoa (cloth measure, Palaiseau p.148)	106.9	241.1 mm	
Genoa (linear measure, Palaiseau p.91)	107.43	242.3 mm	
Genoa (Rose)		247 mm	9.72
Livorno (for silk, Palaiseau p.157)	128.41	289.7 mm	
Livorno (for wool, Palaiseau p.157)	130.08	293.4 mm	
Malta (cloth measure, Palaiseau p.160)	114.49	258.3 mm	
Malta (linear measure, Palaiseau p.98)	115.28	260.0 mm	
Naples (Rose)		263.6 mm	10.38
Palermo (cloth measure, Palaiseau p.168)	107.16	241.7 mm	9.53
Portugal (Palaiseau p.109)	96.36	217.4 mm	8.64
Rome (cloth measure, Palaiseau p.173)	109.52	247.1 mm	
Rome (linear measure, Palaiseau p.111)	99	[223] mm	
Sardinia (Rose)		248 mm	9.78
Spain (Rose)		219 mm	8.64
Metric equivalents from Palaiseau here rounded to 0.1 mm

From 19th C. Italian sources emerges that :

- the ancient Venetian palm, five of which made a passo (pace), was equivalent to 0.3774 metres.

- the Neapolitan palm = 0.26333670 metres (from 1480 to 1840)

- the Neapolitan palm = 0.26455026455 metres (according to the law of 6 April 1840)

which differs from previously cited palm measure equivalents in metres above.

=== England ===
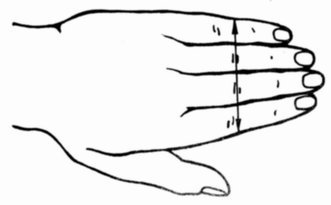
The English palm as the width of four fingers.

The English palm, handbreadth, or handsbreadth is three inches (7.62 cm) (Note: An exact figure since the adoption of the international yard and pound agreement during the 1950s and '60s by the nations using the English system.) or, equivalently, four digits. The measurement was, however, not always well distinguished from the hand or handful, which became equal to four inches by a 1541 statute of Henry VIII. (Note: Mortimer, e.g., notes that during his time "The hand among horse-dealers, &c. is four-fingers' breadth, being the fist clenched, whereby the height of a horse is measured", showing a confusion of the notional separation of "palms", "hands", and "fists".) The palm was excluded from the British Weights and Measures Act 1824 that established the imperial system and is not a standard US customary unit.

=== Elsewhere ===
The Moroccan palm is given by Hutton as about 18.20 cm (7.2 in).
