= Shaftment =

Obsolete unit of measurement

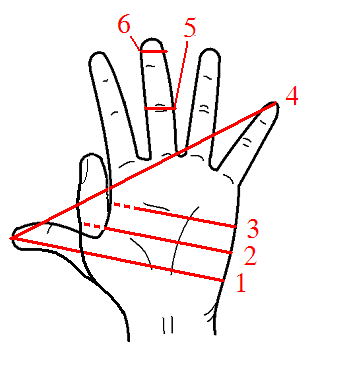
Some hand-based measurements, including the shaftment (1)

The shaftment is an obsolete unit of length defined since the 12th century as 6 inches, which nowadays is exactly 152.4 mm. A shaftment was traditionally the width of the fist and outstretched thumb. The lengths of poles, staves, etc. can be easily measured by grasping the bottom of the staff with thumb extended and repeating such hand over hand grips along the length of the staff.

== History ==
It occurs in Anglo-Saxon written records as early as 910 and in English as late as 1474. After the modern foot came into use in the twelfth century, the shaftment was reinterpreted as exactly 1/2 foot or 6 inches (152.4 mm).

== Spelling and etymology ==
Other spellings include schaftmond and scaeftemunde, and shathmont. It is derived from Old English sceaft, in turn from Proto-Germanic: *skaftaz ('shaft') and Old English mund, from the Proto-Germanic *mund, in turn from Proto-Indo-European: *man ('hand').

Two shaftments make a pes manualis (Latin for 'a foot fitted to the hand').

This unit has mostly fallen out of use, as have others based on the human arm: digit (1/8 shaftment), finger (7/48 shaftment), palm (1/2 shaftment) hand (2/3 shaftment), span (1.5 shaftments), cubit (3 shaftments) and ell (7.5 shaftments).
