= Hand (unit) =

Unit of length

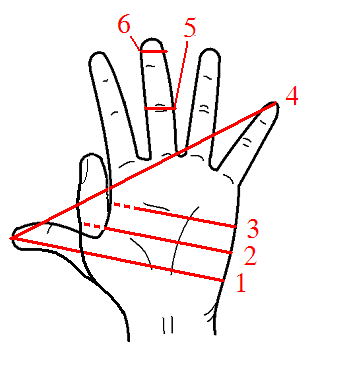
- The hand (2) and palm (3) measurements shown, among others, on a human hand

General information
- Unit system: Imperial/US units
- Unit of: Length
- Symbol: h, hh

Conversions
1 h in ...	... is equal to ...
- Imperial/US units: 4 in; 1/3 ft
- SI units: 101.6 mm; 10.16 cm

The hand is a non-SI unit of measurement of length standardized to four inches (101.6 mm). It is used to measure the height of horses in many English-speaking countries, including Australia, Canada, Ireland, the United Kingdom, and the United States. It was originally based on the breadth of a human hand. The adoption of the international inch in 1959 allowed for a standardized imperial form and a metric conversion. It may be abbreviated to "h" or "hh". Although measurements between whole hands are usually expressed in what appears to be decimal format, the subdivision of the hand is not decimal but is in base 4, so subdivisions after the radix point are in quarters of a hand, which are inches. Thus, 62 inches is fifteen and a half hands, or 15.2 hh (normally said as "fifteen-two", or occasionally in full as "fifteen hands two inches").

== Terminology ==
"Hands" may be abbreviated to "h", or "hh". The "hh" form is sometimes interpreted as standing for "hands high". When spoken aloud, hands are stated by numbers, 15.0 is "fifteen hands", 15.2 is alternately "fifteen-two" or "fifteen hands, two inches", and so on.

To convert inches to hands, the number in inches is divided by four, then the remainder is added after the radix point. Thus, a horse that measures 60 inches is 15 hands high (15 × 4 = 60) and a horse halfway between 15 and 16 hands is 15.2 hands, or 62 inches tall (15 × 4 + 2 = 62) Because the subdivision of a hand is a base 4 system, a horse 64 inches high is 16.0 hands high, not 15.4. A designation of "15.5 hands" is not halfway between 15 and 16 hands, but rather reads 15 hands and five inches, an impossibility in a base 4 radix numbering system, where a hand is four inches.

== History ==
=== Ancient Egypt ===
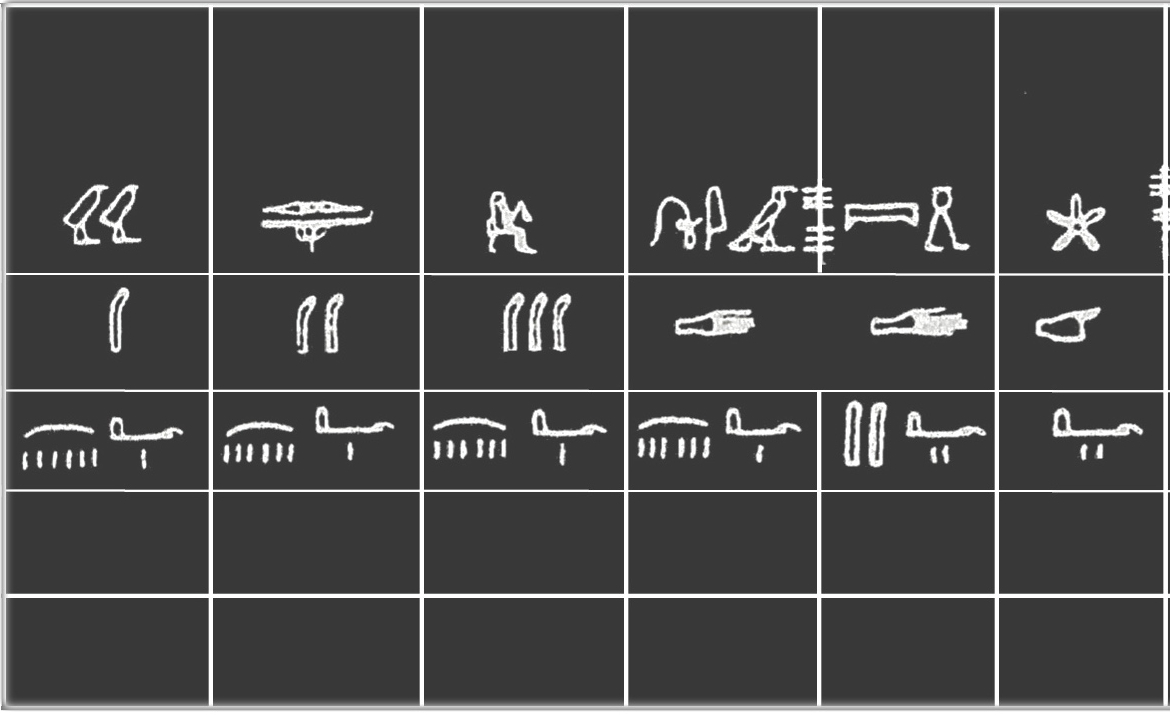
Detail of the cubit rod in the Museo Egizio of Turin, showing digit, palm, hand and fist lengths

The hand, sometimes also called a handbreadth or handsbreadth, is an anthropic unit, originally based on the breadth of a male human hand, either with or without the thumb, or on the height of a clenched fist.

On surviving Ancient Egyptian cubit-rods, the royal cubit is divided into seven palms of four digits or fingers each. Five digits are equal to a hand, with thumb; and six to a closed fist. The royal cubit measured approximately 525 mm, so the width of the ancient Egyptian hand was about 94 mm.

Ancient Egyptian units of length
Name	Egyptian name	Equivalent Egyptian values	Metric equivalent	Imperial equivalent
Royal cubit	M23 t n D42 meh niswt	7 palms or 28 digits	525 mm	20.67 in
Fist		6 digits	108 mm	4.25 in
Hand		5 digits	94 mm	3.70 in
Palm	D48 shesep	4 digits	75 mm	2.95 in
Digit	D50 djeba	1/4 palm	19 mm	0.75 in

=== Biblical use ===
In Biblical exegesis the hand measurement, as for example in the Vision of the Temple, Authorized Version Ezekiel 40:43, is usually taken to be palm or handbreadth, and in modern translations may be rendered as "handbreadth" or "three inches".

=== United Kingdom ===
The hand is a traditional unit in the UK. It was standardised at four inches by a statute of King Henry VIII, the Horses Act 1540 (32 Hen. 8. c. 13), but some confusion between the various types of hand measurement, and particularly between the hand and the handsbreadth, appears to have persisted. Phillips's dictionary of 1706 gives four inches for the length of the handful or hand, and three inches for the handsbreadth; Mortimer gives the same, three inches for the Hand's-breadth, and four for the "Handful, or simply, Hand", but adds "The hand among horse-dealers, &c. is four-fingers' breadth, being the fist clenched, whereby the height of a horse is measured", thus equating "hand" with both the palm and the fist. Similarly, Wright's 1831 translation of Buffon mentions "A hand breadth (palmus), the breadth of the four fingers of the hand, or three inches", but the Encyclopædia Perthensis of 1816 gives under Palm (4): "A hand, or measure of lengths comprising three inches".

== Use in measuring horses ==
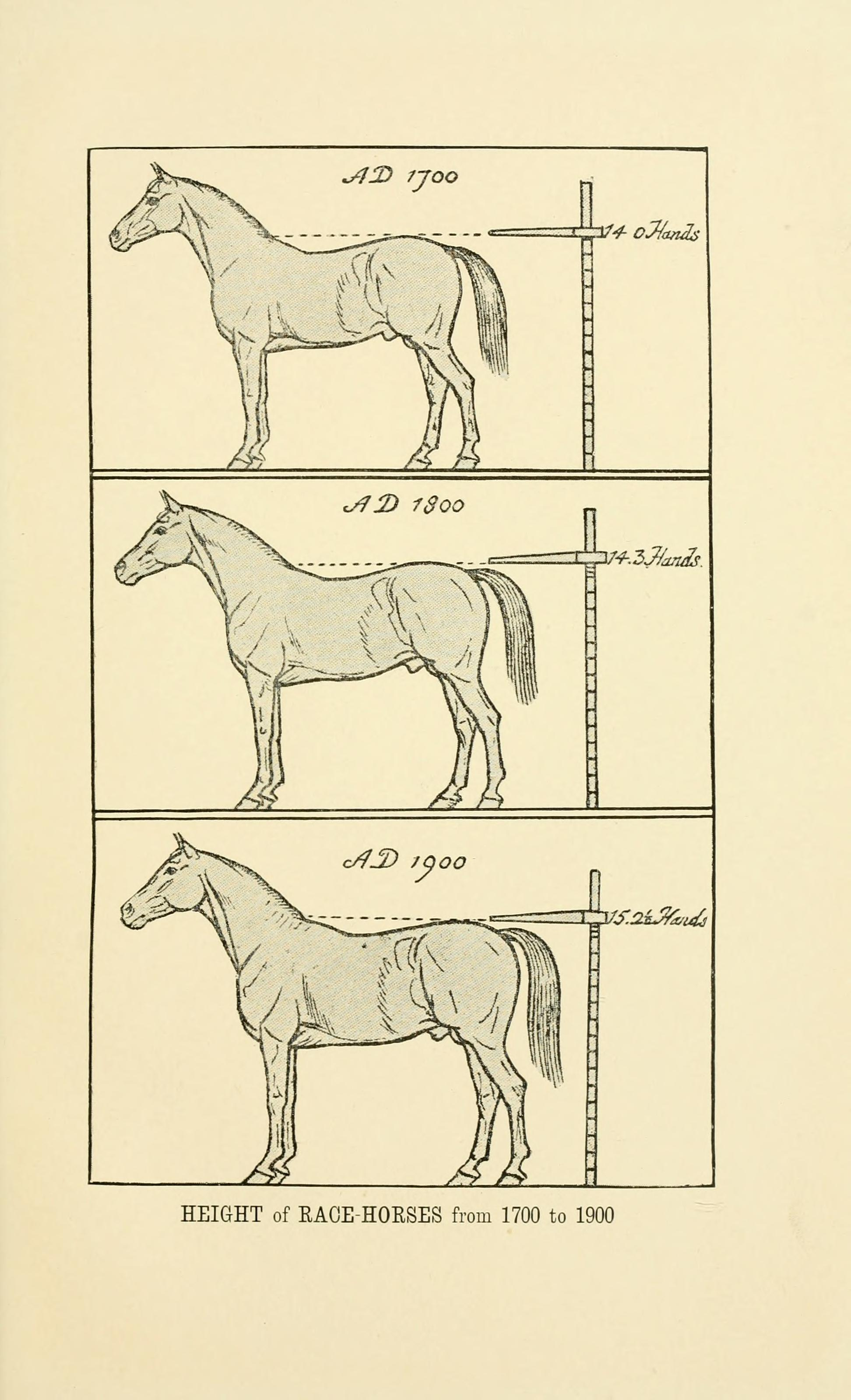
Chart illustrating the increase in height of racehorses, from 14 hh (142 cm) in 1700 to 15.2 1/2 hh (159 cm) in 1900.

Today the hand is used to measure the height of horses, ponies, and other equines. It is used in the US and also in some other nations that use the metric system, such as Australia, New Zealand, Canada, Ireland and the UK. In other parts of the world, including continental Europe and in FEI-regulated international competition, horses are measured in metric units, usually metres or centimetres. In South Africa, measurements may be given in both hands and centimetres, while in Australia, the equestrian regulations stipulate that both measurements are to be given.

In those countries where hands are the usual unit for measuring horse height, inches rather than hands are commonly used in the measurement of smaller equines including miniature horses/ponies, miniature mules, donkeys, and Shetland ponies.

A horse is measured from the ground to the top of the highest non-variable point of the skeleton, the withers. For official measurement, the spinous process of the fifth thoracic vertebra may be identified by palpation, and marked if necessary. Some varieties of Miniature horses are measured at the base of the last true hairs of the mane rather than at the withers.

For international competition regulated by the Fédération Équestre Internationale (FEI) and for USEF competition in the US, a horse can be measured with shoes on or off. In the United Kingdom, official measurement of horses is overseen by the Joint Measurement Board (JMB). For JMB purposes, the shoes must be removed and the hooves correctly prepared for shoeing prior to measurement.

== See also ==
- Anthropic units
- List of horse breeds
- List of non-coherent units of measurement
- Pony (disambiguation) § Measure of volume
- Span (unit)
