= Tical (unit) =

Southeast Asian unit of mass

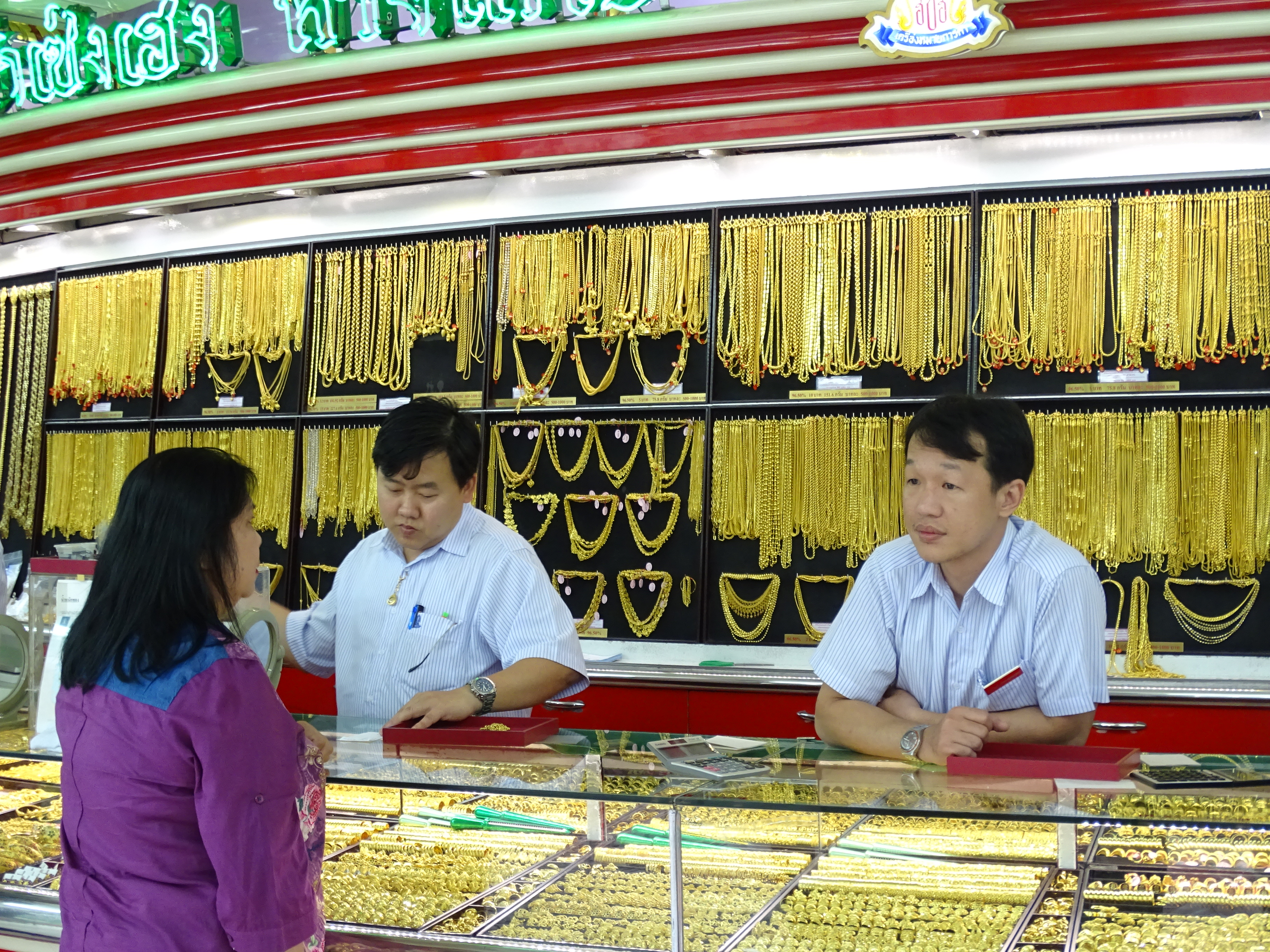
A gold shop in Thailand. The necklace chains are denoted by their weight in baht.

The tical is a unit of mass (or weight in the colloquial sense) historically used in Mainland Southeast Asia, particularly in the predecessor states of Myanmar, where it is known as the kyat (kyattha), and of Cambodia and Thailand, where it is known as the baht (bat). It formed the basis of the modern currencies the Myanmar kyat and the Thai baht, as well as the historical Cambodian tical, which were originally valued as the unit's weight of silver. It remains in widespread use in Myanmar, where it is approximately equivalent to 16.33 grams (0.576 oz), and in the gold trade in Thailand, where it is defined as 15.244 grams (0.5377 oz) for bullion and 15.16 grams (0.535 oz) for jewellery. For other uses, the baht is defined in Thailand as exactly 15 grams (0.5291 oz).

The unit probably arose from multiple origins. In Burma, it was likely equivalent to the Mon unit diṅkel, which is mentioned in several thirteenth-century inscriptions from northern Thailand and may have originated in India, while in the Khmer Empire, it was probably derived as a subdivision equalling a quarter of the tael (known in Khmer as damleng and in Thai as tamlueng), which in turn was introduced through the region's extensive trade with China. The Thais adopted the Khmer units as the Ayutthaya Kingdom displaced the Khmer Empire in the fifteenth century, and as Ayutthaya gained control of the east coast of the Andaman Sea and developed cross-peninsular trade, the units, of roughly the same size, probably became regarded as equivalent by traders, including the Portuguese, who popularized its recognition by Westerners as the tical.

== See also ==
- Burmese units of measurement
- Cambodian units of measurement
- Thai units of measurement
