= Digit (unit) =

Unit of length

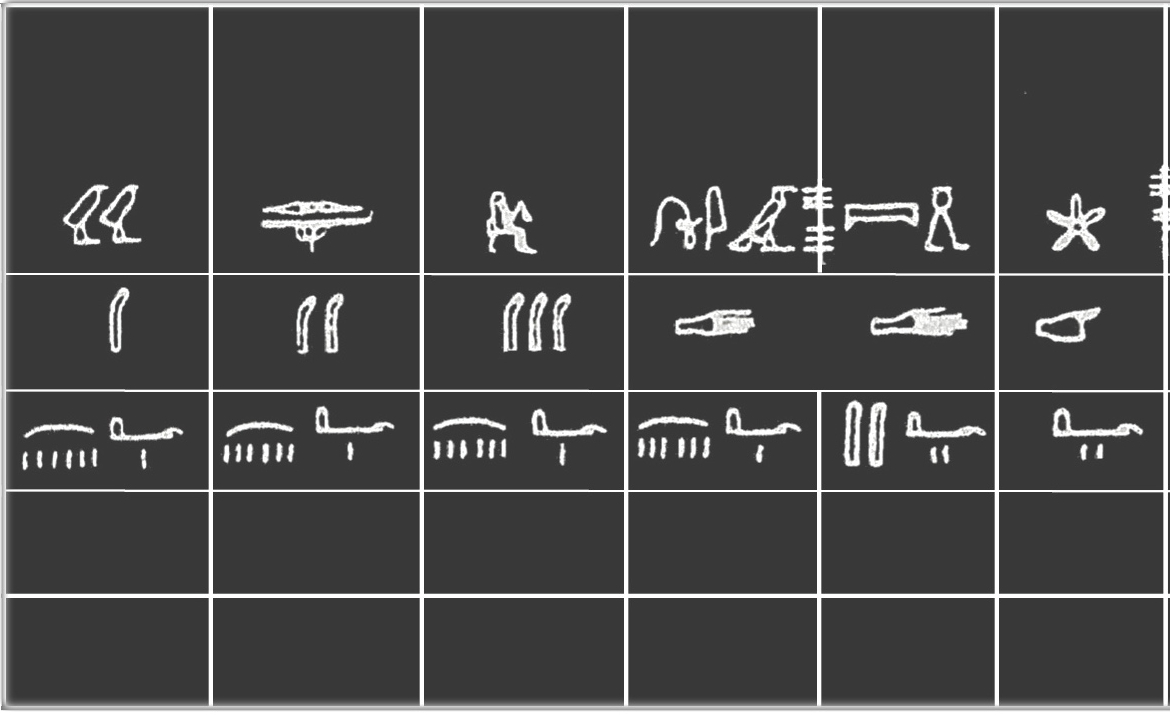
Detail of the Ancient Egyptian cubit rod in the Museo Egizio of Turin, showing digit, palm, hand and fist lengths

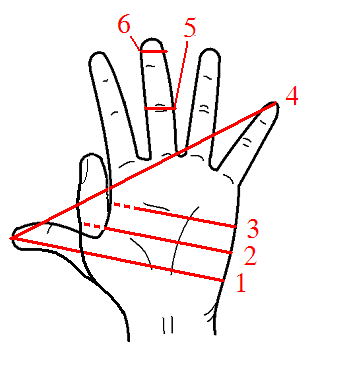
Some hand-based measurements, including the digit (6)

The digit or finger is an ancient and obsolete non-SI unit of measurement of length. It was originally based on the breadth of a human finger. It was a fundamental unit of length in the Ancient Egyptian, Mesopotamian, Hebrew, Ancient Greek and Roman systems of measurement.

In astronomy a digit is one twelfth of the diameter of the sun or the moon.

== History ==
=== Ancient Egypt ===
The digit, also called a finger or fingerbreadth, is a unit of measurement originally based on the breadth of a human finger. In Ancient Egypt it was the basic unit of subdivision of the cubit.

On surviving Ancient Egyptian cubit-rods, the royal cubit is divided into seven palms of four digits or fingers each. The royal cubit measured approximately 525 mm, so the length of the ancient Egyptian digit was about 19 mm.

Ancient Egyptian units of length
Name	Egyptian name	Equivalent Egyptian values	Metric equivalent
Royal cubit	M23 t n D42 meh niswt	7 palms or 28 digits	525 mm
Fist		6 digits	108 mm
Hand		5 digits	94 mm
Palm	D48 shesep	4 digits	75 mm
Digit	D50 djeba	1/4 palm	19 mm

=== Mesopotamia ===
In the classical Akkadian Empire system instituted in about 2250 BC during the reign of Naram-Sin, the finger was one-thirtieth of a cubit length. The cubit was equivalent to approximately 497 mm, so the finger was equal to about 17 mm. Basic length was used in architecture and field division.

Mesopotamian units of length
Unit	Ratio	Metric equivalent	Sumerian	Akkadian	Cuneiform
grain	1/180	2.8 mm	še	uţţatu	𒊺
finger	1/30	17 mm	šu-si	ubānu	𒋗𒋛
foot	2/3	331 mm	šu-du_{3}-a	šīzu	𒋗𒆕𒀀
cubit	1	497 mm	kuš_{3}	ammatu	𒌑

=== Britain ===
A digit (lat. digitus, "finger"), when used as a unit of length, is usually a sixteenth of a foot or 3/4" (1.905 cm for the international inch). The width of an adult human male finger tip is indeed about 2 centimetres. In English this unit has mostly fallen out of use, as do others based on the human arm: finger (7/6 digit), palm (4 digits), hand (16/3 digits), shaftment (8 digits), span (12 digits), cubit (24 digits) and ell (60 digits).

== Astronomy ==
In astronomy a digit is, or was until recently, one twelfth of the diameter of the sun or the moon. This is found in the Moralia of Plutarch, XII:23, but the definition as exactly one twelfth of the diameter may be due to Ptolemy. Sosigenes of Alexandria had observed in the 1st century AD that on a dioptra, a disc with a diameter of 11 or 12 digits (of length) was needed to cover the moon.

The unit was used in Arab or Islamic astronomical works such as those of Ṣadr al‐Sharīʿa al‐Thānī (d.1346/7), where it is called Arabic: إصبع iṣba' , digit or finger.

The astronomical digit was in use in Britain for centuries. Heath, writing in 1760, explains that 12 digits are equal to the diameter in eclipse of the sun, but that 23 may be needed for the Earth's shadow as it eclipses the moon, those over 12 representing the extent to which the Earth's shadow is larger than the Moon. The unit is apparently not in current use, but is found in recent dictionaries.

== See also ==
- Finger (unit)
- Finger tip unit
- Cubit
- Anthropic units
