= Bhojpuri units of measurement =

Bhojpuri Units are the units of measurement that are used in the Bhojpuri region of India and Nepal.

== Length ==
Table of equivalences
| Bhojpuri unit | SI (metric) | Imperial units | Traditional definition |
|---|---|---|---|
| angul (𑂃𑂁𑂏𑂳𑂪) | 17 mm | 2/3 Inch | A finger-breath, 3 Pains, 9 Suts |
| Chaua (𑂒𑂸𑂄) | 67.73 mm | 2.67 Inch | Four angul |
| muttha (𑂧𑂳𑂗𑂹𑂘𑂰) | 67.73 mm | 2.67 Inch | Width of a Fist, Used in Shahabad Region instead of Chaua |
| Bitta (𑂥𑂱𑂞𑂹𑂞𑂰) | 203.2 mm | 8 inch | 12 anguls |
| Sut (𑂮𑂴𑂞) | 17/27 mm | 2/27 Inch | Thickness of a thread |
| Pain (𑂣𑂶𑂢) | 51/27 mm | 6/27 inch | 3 Suts |
| Tassur (𑂞𑂮𑂹𑂮𑂳𑂩) | 17 mm | 2/3 Inch | A finger-breath, 3 Pains, 9 Suts, 1 angul (to measure wood, it's 2 angul) |
| Gaj (𑂏𑂔; wood measure) | 476 mm | 56/3 inch | 28 anguls (for measuring wood; hath is used instead |
| Hanth (𑂯𑂰𑂁𑂟) | 406 mm | 16 Inch | 24 angul, 2 Bitta. (Hath can vary from 15 to 20 inches, hence the average 18 inches can be considered as 1 Cubit) |
| deg (𑂙𑂵𑂏) or Gaj | 914.4 mm | 36 Inch | 2 Hath, 4 Bitta |
| Girah (𑂏𑂱𑂩𑂯) | 57.15 mm | 9/4 Inch | Length of Forefinger, 1/16 Gaj |
| Laggi (𑂪𑂏𑂹𑂏𑂲) | 2743.2 mm | 108 inch | 3 Gaj (also called Baans or Lattha) |
| Sikandari Gaj (𑂮𑂱𑂍𑂁𑂠𑂩𑂲 𑂏𑂔) | 812 mm | 32 Inch | 48 angul, 2 haath (also called Barka Gaj) |
| rasari (𑂩𑂮𑂩𑂲) | 48768 mm | 1920 Inch | 20 laggi (70 cubit in South-West Shahabad) |
| kos (𑂍𑂷𑂮) | 2926 meters | 9600 feet | 60 rasari (50 in South-West Shahabad); |

== Area ==
| Bhojpuri unit | SI ('Metric') | Relationship |
|---|---|---|
| dhur (𑂡𑂴𑂩) | | 1 Square Laggi |
| Kattha (𑂍𑂗𑂹𑂘𑂰) | | 20 Dhur |
| Bigaha (𑂥𑂱𑂏𑂯𑂰) | | 20 Kattha |
| Pakka Bigaha | 1337.8 sq. meter | Pakka Bigaha is 14400 sq. feet. Bigaha depends on laggi and hath which varies from 15 to 20 inches. Hence, the normal Bigaha varies. |

== Weight ==
| Bhojpuri unit | SI ('Metric') | Relationship |
|---|---|---|
| ratti | 0.12 Gram | |
| Maas | 0.97 Gram | 8 ratti |
| Tola | | 12 Maas |
| Chhaatank | | 5 Tola |
| Ser | | 16 Chhatank |
| adhpai | | 1/8 Ser |
| pauwa | | 1/4 Ser |
| Adhsera | | 1/2 Ser |
| Teenpauwa | | 3/4 Ser |
| Sawaiya | | 5/4 Ser |
| Derhseri | | 3/2 Ser |
| Arahiya | | 1/2 Paseri |
| Paseri | | 5 Ser |
| Dhaara | | 10 Ser |
| Man | | 40 Ser |

== Proportion ==
Proportion is generally expressed by saying so many aana in a Rupiya. 16 aanas make one rupee. Thus, one aana in a rupee equal 1:16.

== Bibliography ==
- Grierson, G.A. (1885). Bihar Peasant Life. London: The Bengal Secretariat Press.
- Tiwari, Arjun (2019). Bhojpuri Hindi Shabkosh (in Hindi) (1st ed.). Varanasi: Vishwavidyalaya Prakashan. ISBN 978-93-87643-11-6.
