= Macedonian cubit =

The Macedonian cubit was a unit of measurement in use in ancient Macedonia. It was approximately 14 inches long, making it somewhat shorter than other cubit measurements used in the ancient world.

== See also ==
- Ancient weights and measures
- Cubit
