= Rai, ngan, and tarang wa =

Thai units of area

The rai, (Note: Thai: ไร่, pronounced [râj].) ngan, (Note: Also spelled ngaan; งาน [ŋɑ̄ːn].) and tarang wa or square wa (Note: Also tarang wah or square wah; ตารางวา [tɑ̄ː.rɑ̄ːŋ wɑ̄ː].) are customary Thai units of area, used in the measurement of land. They are defined as exactly 1,600, 400, and 4 square metres, respectively (17,222, 4,306, and 43 sq ft).

The tarang wa (square wa, tarang meaning 'grid') is derived from the area of a square with sides of 1 wa (the Thai fathom). 1 ngan ('work') is equal to 100 square wa, and 1 rai ('field' or 'plantation') equals 4 ngan or 1 square sen. The units were standardised in square metres when Thailand (then Siam) adopted the metric system in 1923, although the Royal Survey Department was already reported in 1908 to be using the metre-based conversion for its cadastral maps.

The units are commonly used for cadastre and property matters, and official and legal documents express areas of land in such units. They are sometimes notated in the abbreviated format rai-ngan-tarang wa, e.g. "4-2-25 rai", which means "4 rai, 2 ngan, and 25 tarang wa", though this is discouraged by some government documents.

Unit conversions
Unit	Derivation	Relative	SI (or other metric)	US or UK customary
Tarang wa	Square wa		4 m^{2}	43 sq ft
Ngan		100 tarang wa	400 m^{2}	4,306 sq ft
Rai	Square sen	4 ngan or 400 tarang wa	1,600 m^{2} (16 ares)	17,222 sq ft (0.4 acres)
