= Measuring rod =

Tool used to physically measure lengths

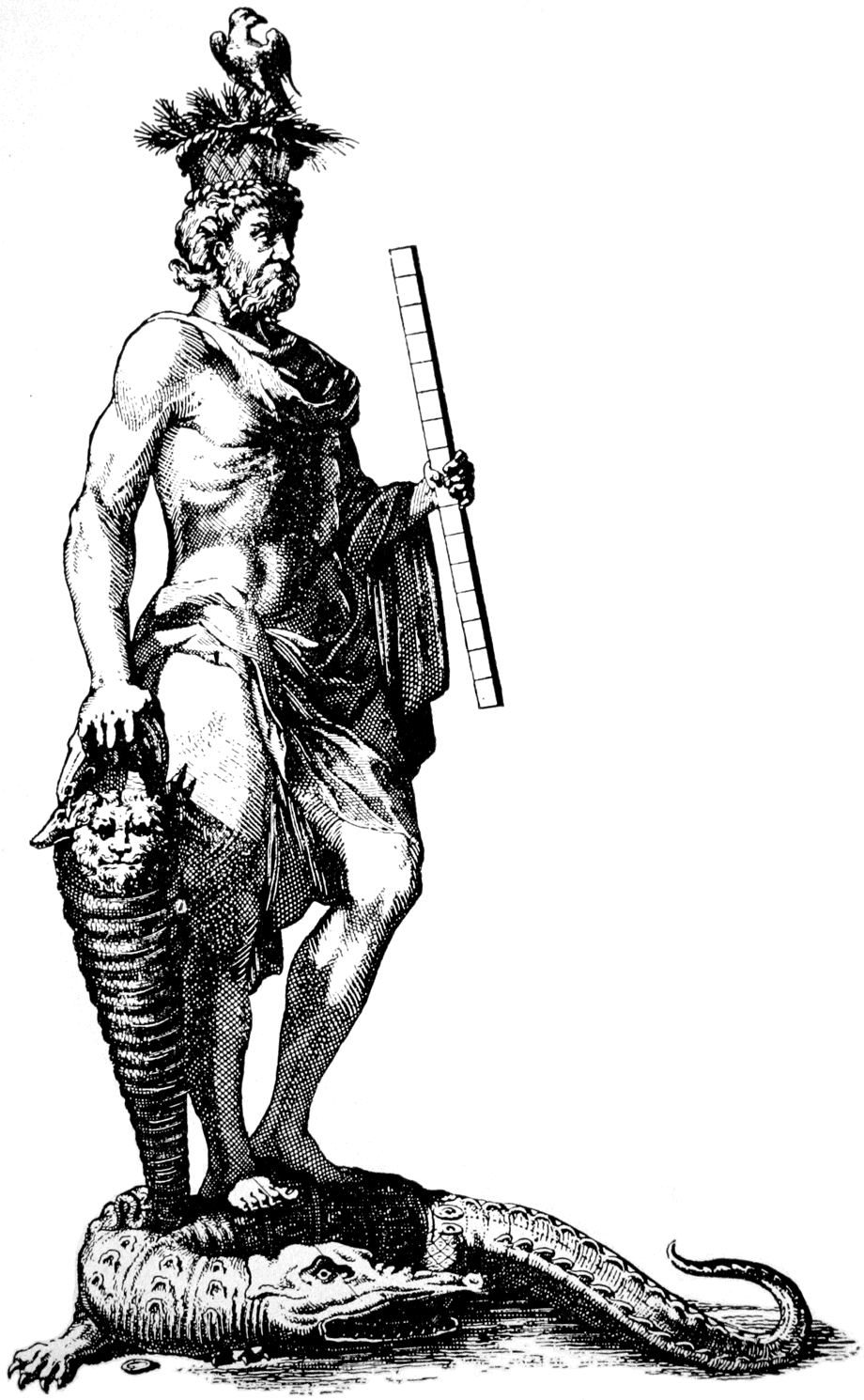
Graeco-Egyptian God Serapis with measuring rod

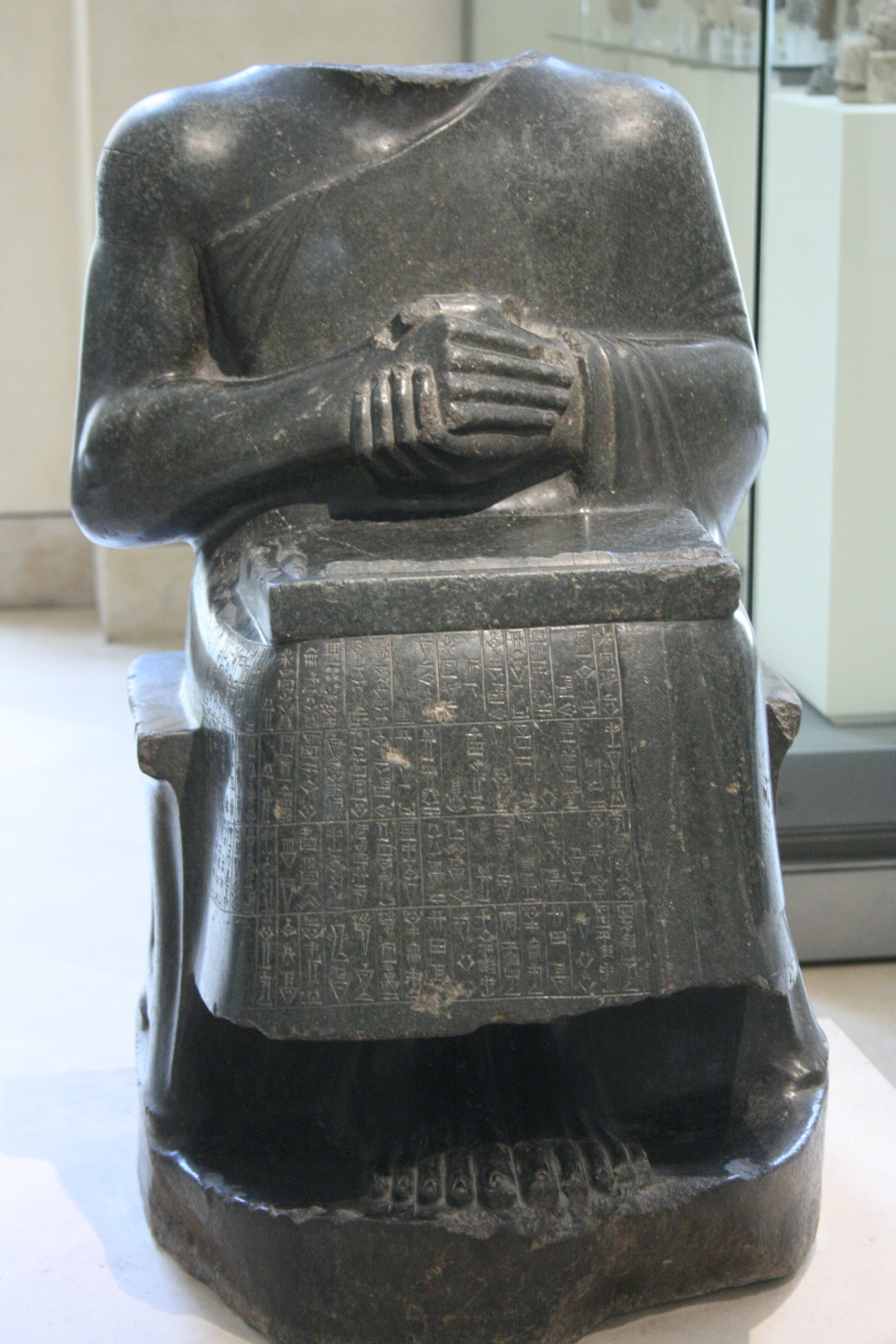
Gudea of Lagash with measuring rod and surveyors' tools

A measuring rod is a tool used to physically measure lengths and survey areas of various sizes. Most measuring rods are round or square sectioned; however, they can also be flat boards. Some have markings at regular intervals. It is likely that the measuring rod was used before the line, chain or steel tapes used in modern measurement.

== History ==
=== Ancient Sumer ===
The oldest preserved measuring rod is a copper-alloy bar which was found by the German Assyriologist Eckhard Unger while excavating at Nippur (pictured below). The bar dates from c. 2650 BC. and Unger claimed it was used as a measurement standard. This irregularly formed and irregularly marked graduated rule supposedly defined the Sumerian cubit as about 518.5 mm (20.4 in), although this does not agree with other evidence from the statues of Gudea from the same region, five centuries later.

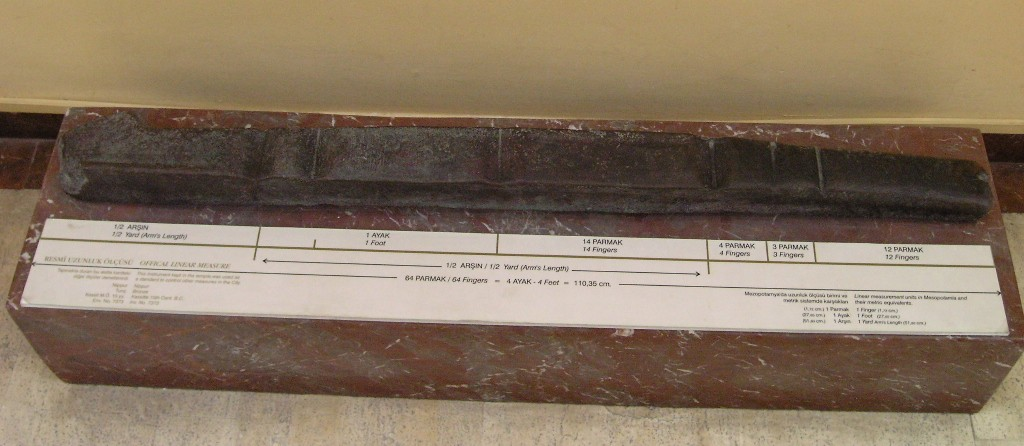
Nippur cubit, graduated specimen of an ancient measure from Nippur, Mesopotamia (3rd millennium B.C.) – displayed in the Archeological Museum of Istanbul (Turkey)

=== Ancient India ===
Rulers made from ivory were in use by the Indus Valley Civilization in what today is Pakistan, and in some parts of Western India prior to 1500 BCE. Excavations at Lothal dating to 2400 BCE have yielded one such ruler calibrated to about 1/16 inch (1.6 mm) Ian Whitelaw (2007) holds that 'The Mohenjo-Daro ruler is divided into units corresponding to 1.32 inches (34 mm) and these are marked out in decimal subdivisions with remarkable accuracy—to within 0.005 inches (0.13 mm). Ancient bricks found throughout the region have dimensions that correspond to these units.' The sum total of ten graduations from Lothal is approximate to the angula in the Arthashastra.

=== Ancient East Asia ===
Measuring rods for different purposes and sizes (construction, tailoring and land survey) have been found from China and elsewhere dating to the early 2nd millennium B.C.E.

=== Ancient Egypt ===
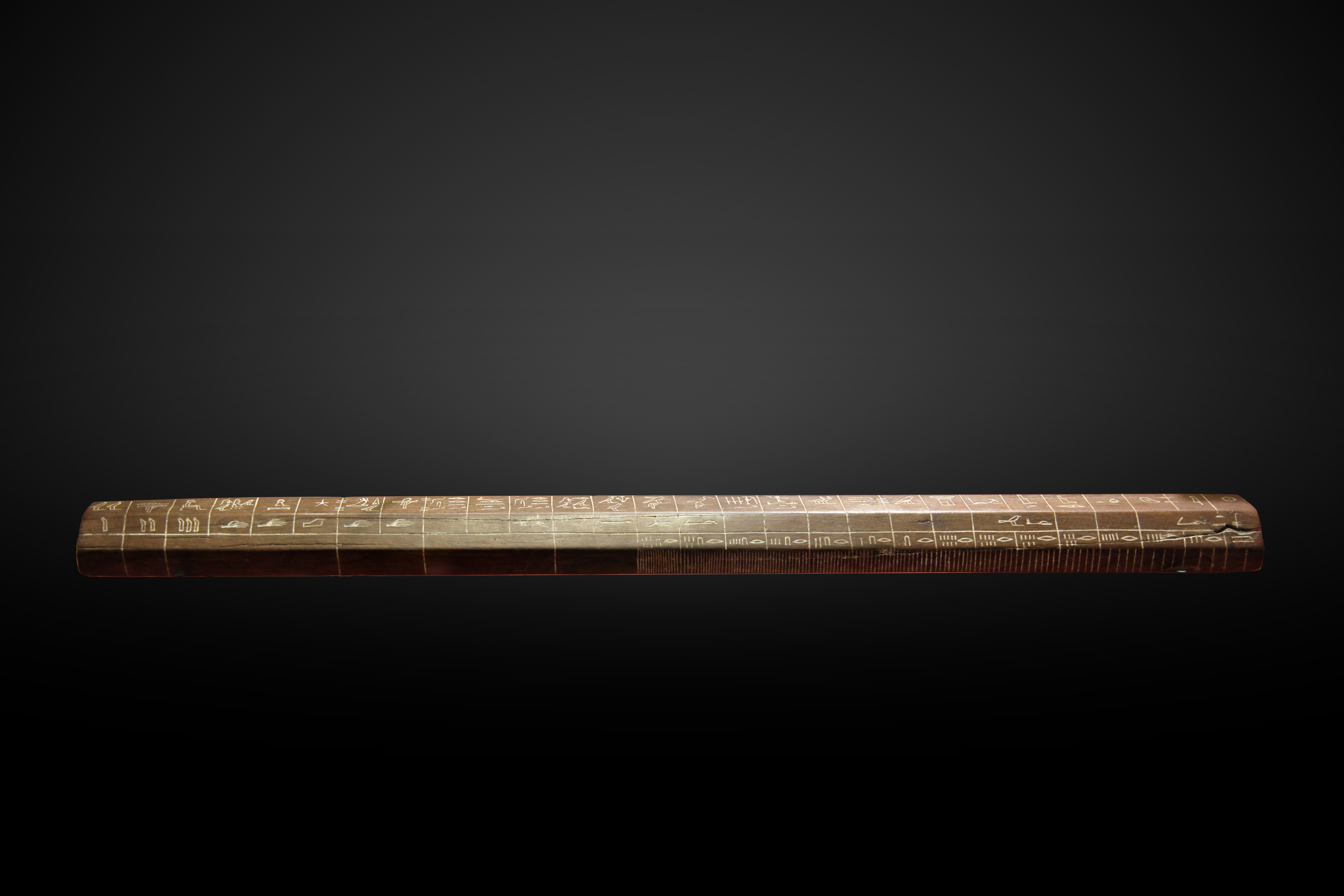
Cubit rod of Maya defining the cubit as 52.3 cm, 1336–1327 BC (Eighteenth Dynasty)

Cubit-rods of wood or stone were used in Ancient Egypt. Fourteen of these were described and compared by Lepsius in 1865. Flinders Petrie reported on a rod that shows a length of 520.5 mm, a few millimetres less than the Egyptian cubit. A slate measuring rod was also found, divided into fractions of a Royal Cubit and dating to the time of Akhenaten.

Further cubit rods have been found in the tombs of officials. Two examples are known from the tomb of Maya—the treasurer of the 18th dynasty pharaoh Tutankhamun—in Saqqara. Another was found in the tomb of Kha (TT8) in Thebes. These cubits are ca 52.5 cm (20.7 in) long and are divided into seven palms, each palm is divided into four fingers and the fingers are further subdivided. Another wooden cubit rod was found in Theban tomb TT40 (Huy) bearing the throne name of Tutankhamun (Nebkheperure).

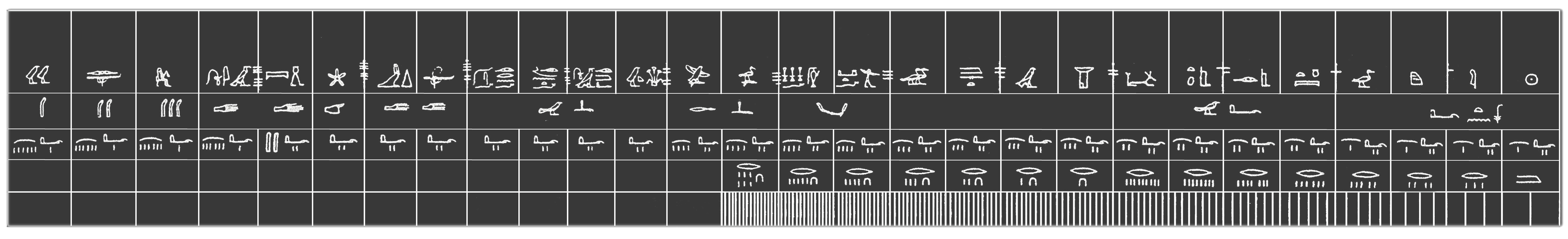
Cubit rod from the Turin Museum

Egyptian measuring rods also had marks for the Remen measurement of approximately 370 mm (15 in), used in construction of the Pyramids.

=== Ancient Europe ===
An oak rod from the Iron Age fortified settlement at Borre Fen in Denmark measured 135.0 centimetres (53.15 in), with marks dividing it up into eight parts of 16.9 centimetres (6.64 in), corresponding quite closely to half a Doric Pous (a Greek foot). A hazel measuring rod recovered from a Bronze Age burial mound in Borum Eshøj, East Jutland by P. V. Glob in 1875 measured 78 centimetres (30.9 in) corresponding remarkably well to the traditional Danish foot. The megalithic structures of Great Britain has been hypothesized to have been built by a "Megalithic Yard", though some authorities believe these structures have been measured out by pacing. Several tentative Bronze Age bone fragments have been suggested as being parts of a measuring rod for this hypothetical measurement.

=== Roman Empire ===
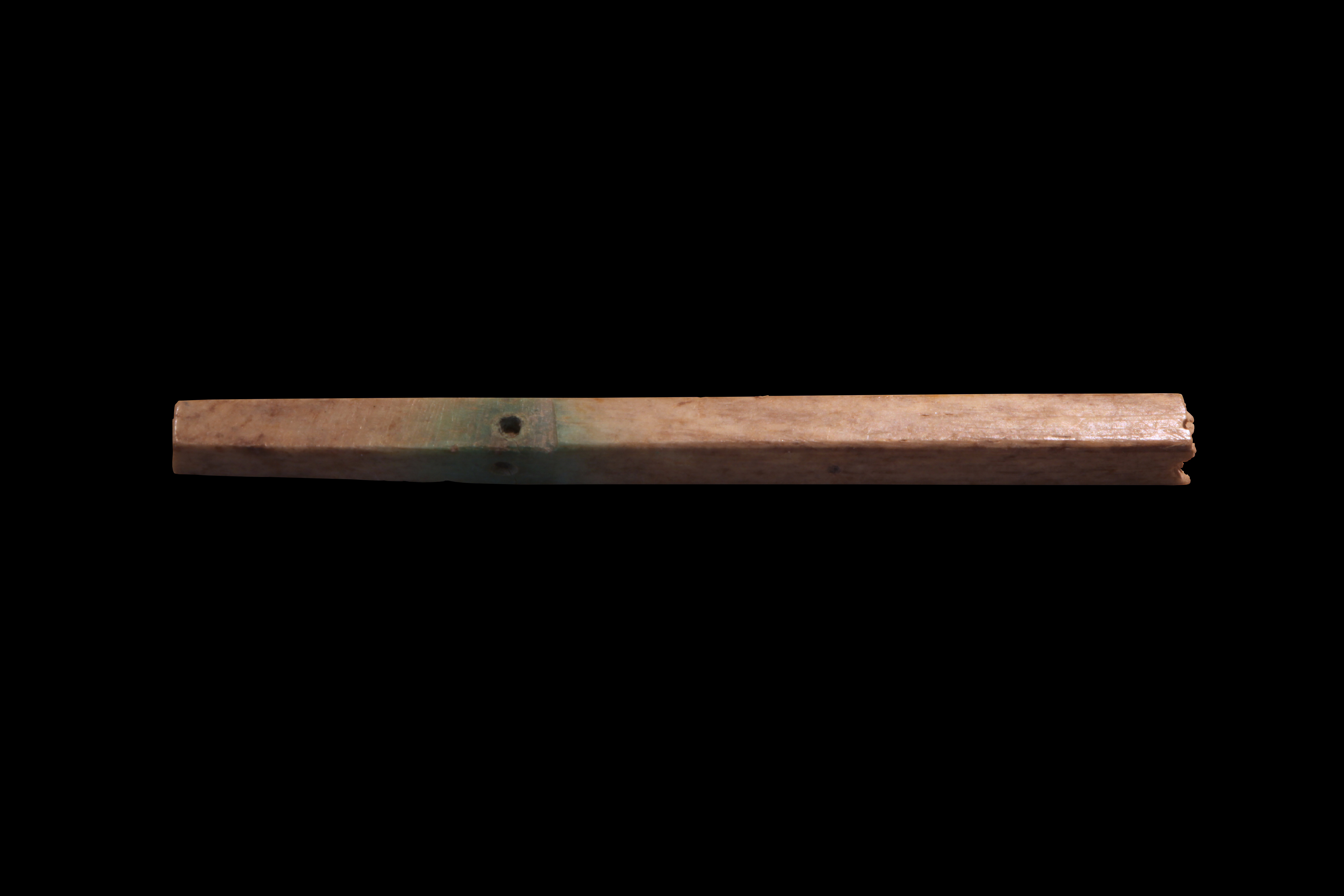
Fragment of a Roman measuring rod, from Musée romain de Lausanne-Vidy

Large public works and imperial expansion, particularly the large network of Roman roads and the many milecastles, made the measuring rod an indispensable part of both the military and civilian aspects of Roman life. Republican Rome used several measures, including the various Greek feet measurements and the Oscan foot of 27.5 cm. Standardisation was introduced by Agrippa in 29 BC, replacing all previous measurements by a Roman foot of 29.6 cm, which became the foot of Imperial Rome.

The Roman measuring rod was 10 Roman feet long, and hence called a decempeda, Latin for 'ten-footer'. It was usually of square section capped at both ends by a metal shoe, and painted in alternating colours. Together with the groma and dioptra, the decempeda formed the basic kit for the Roman surveyors. The measuring rod is frequently found depicted in Roman art showing the surveyors at work. A shorter folding yardstick one Roman foot long is known from excavations of a Roman fort in Niederburg, Germany.

=== Middle Ages ===
In the Middle Ages, bars were used as standards of length when surveying land. These bars often used a unit of measure called a rod, of length equal to 5.5 yards, 5.0292 metres, 16.5 feet, or 1/320 of a statute mile. A rod is the same length as a perch or a pole. In Old English, the term lug is also used. The length is equal to the standardized length of the ox goad used for teams of eight oxen by medieval English ploughmen. The lengths of the perch (one rod unit) and chain (four rods) were standardized in 1607 by Edmund Gunter. The rod unit was still in use as a common unit of measurement in the mid-19th century, when Henry David Thoreau used it frequently when describing distances in his work Walden.

== In culture ==
=== Iconography ===
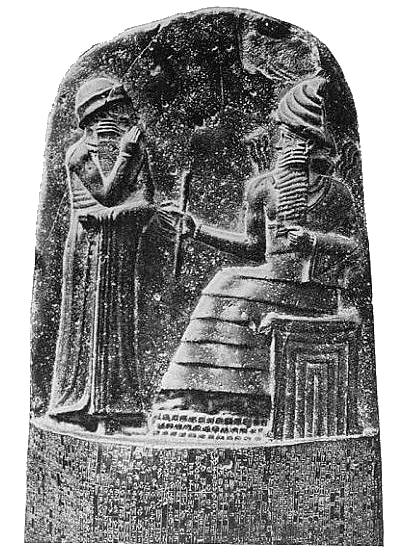
Measuring rod and coiled rope depicted in the Code of Hammurabi

Two statues of Gudea of Lagash in the Louvre depict him sitting with a tablet on his lap, upon which are placed surveyors tools including a measuring rod.

Seal 154 recovered from Alalakh, now in the Biblioteque Nationale show a seated figure with a wedge shaped measuring rod.

The Tablet of Shamash recovered from the ancient Babylonian city of Sippar and dated to the 9th century BC shows Shamash, the Sun God awarding the measuring rod and coiled rope to newly trained surveyors.

A similar scene with measuring rod and coiled rope is shown on the top part of the diorite stele above the Code of Hammurabi in the Louvre, Paris, dating to ca. 1700 BC.

The "measuring rod" or tally stick is common in the iconography of Greek Goddess Nemesis.

The Graeco-Egyptian God Serapis is also depicted in images and on coins with a measuring rod in hand and a vessel on his head.

The most elaborate depiction is found on the Ur-Nammu-stela, where the winding of the cords has been detailed by the sculptor. This has also been described as a "staff and a chaplet of beads".

=== Mythology ===
The myth of Inanna's descent to the nether world describes how the goddess dresses and prepares herself:

She held the lapis-lazuli measuring rod and measuring line in her hand.

Lachesis in Greek mythology was one of the three Moirai (or Fates) and "allotter" (or drawer of lots). She measured the thread of life allotted to each person with her measuring rod. Her Roman equivalent was Decima (the 'Tenth').

Varuna in the Rigveda, is described as using the Sun as a measuring rod to lay out space in a creation myth. W. R. Lethaby has commented on how the measurers were seen as solar deities and noted how Vishnu "measured the regions of the Earth".

=== Bible ===
Measuring rods or reeds are mentioned several times in the Bible. In the Old Testament or Hebrew Bible, a measuring rod and line are seen in a vision of Yahweh in Ezekiel 40:2-3:

In visions of God he took me to the land of Israel and set me on a very high mountain, on whose south side were some buildings that looked like a city. He took me there, and I saw a man whose appearance was like bronze; he was standing in the gateway with a linen cord and a measuring rod in his hand.

One of the eight visions seen by the prophet Zechariah involves a man with a measuring line.

In the New Testament, Revelation 11:1 says that the author:

... was given a reed like a measuring rod and was told, "Go and measure the temple of God and the altar, and count the worshipers there."

The measuring rod also appears in connection with foundation stone rites in Revelation 21:14-15:

And the wall of the city had twelve foundation stones, and on them were the twelve names of the twelve apostles of the Lamb. The one who spoke with me had a gold measuring rod to measure the city, and its gates and its wall.

== See also ==
- Ancient Egyptian units of measurement
- Ancient Greek units of measurement
- Ancient Mesopotamian units of measurement
- Distance measurement
- Levelling rod
- Rod (unit)
- Rod-and-ring symbol
- Ruler
- Shen ring
- Surveying
- Units of measurement
