= Human scale =

Concept that takes people as the primary measure of development

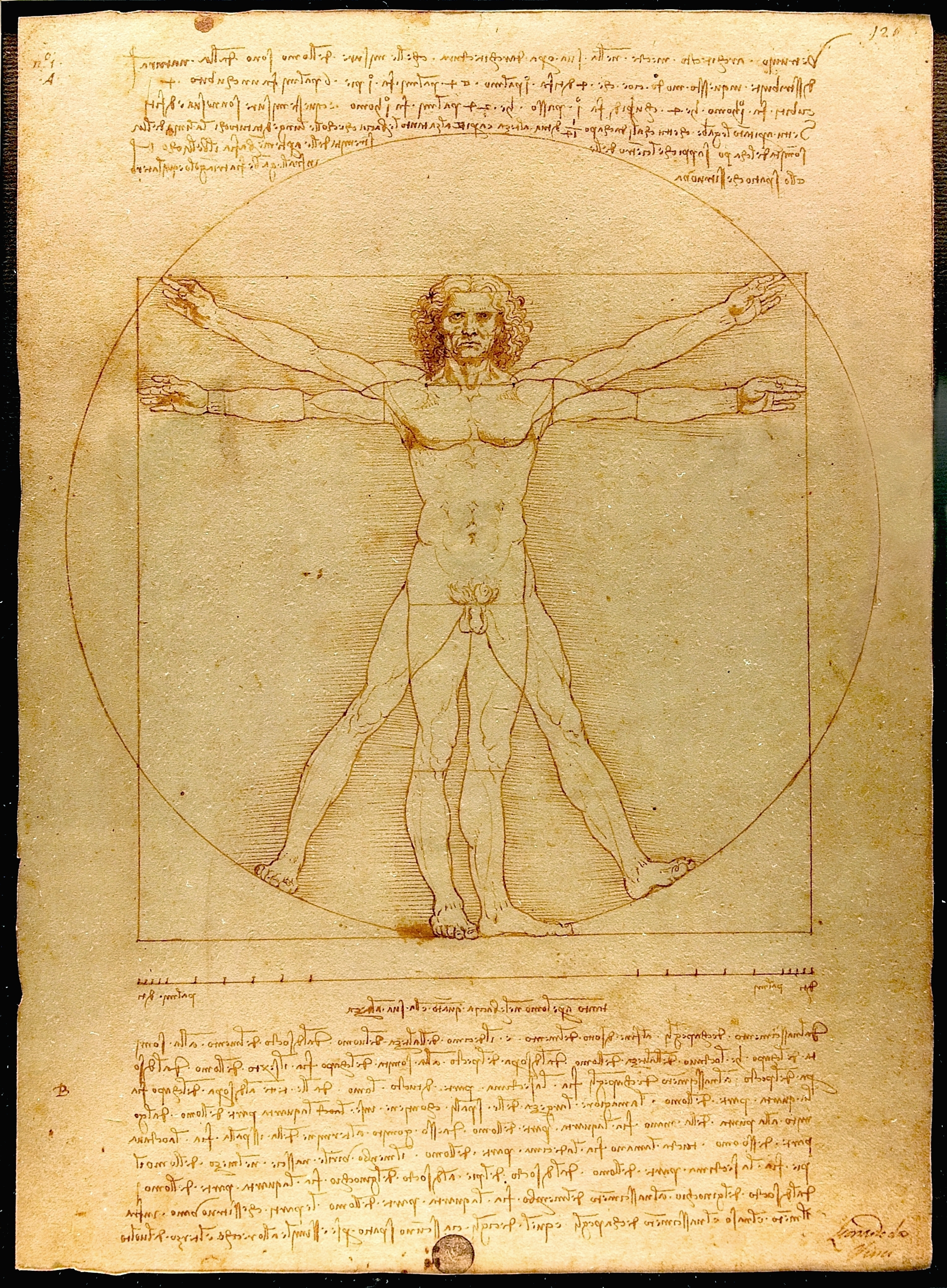
The Vitruvian Man, by Italian polymath Leonardo da Vinci, is based on the correlations of ideal human proportions with geometry described by the ancient Roman architect Vitruvius.

Human scale is the set of physical qualities, and quantities of information, characterizing the human body, its motor, sensory, or mental capabilities, and human social institutions.

== In science ==
Many of the objects of scientific interest in the universe are much larger than human scale (stars, galaxies) or much smaller than human scale (molecules, atoms, subatomic particles).

Similarly, many time periods studied in science involve time scales much greater than human timescales (geological and cosmological time scales) or much shorter than human timescales (atomic and subatomic events).

Mathematicians and scientists use very large and small numbers to describe physical quantities, and have created even larger and smaller numbers for theoretical purposes.

Human scale measurements, however, are more in the order of:

- Distance: one to two metres (0.9–1.8 m or 3–6 ft – human arm's reach, stride, height)
- Attention span: seconds to hours
- Life span: 75 years (mean life expectancy at birth)
- Mass: kilograms – most typically, for newborns from about 3–4 kg (7–9 lb) for a human adult their weight range is about 50–100 kg (100–200 lb)
- Force: newtons (e.g. the weight of a human on Earth, on the order of several hundred newtons, or about 100–200 lb_{f})
- Pressure: one standard atmosphere (average pressure on Earth at sea level, approximately 100 kPa or 30 inHg)
- Temperature: around 300 K (27 °C; 80 °F) (room temperature); 250 to 320 K (−20 to 50 °C; −10 to 120 °F) (normal range of temperatures in most inhabited regions of Earth)
- Energy: typical adult human energy intake is around 10 megajoules (2,400 kilocalories) per day

== In architecture ==
Le Corbusier's Modulor scale of proportions

Humans interact with their environments based on their physical dimensions, capabilities and limits. The field of anthropometrics (human measurement) has unanswered questions, but it's still true that human physical characteristics are fairly predictable and objectively measurable. Buildings scaled to human physical capabilities have steps, doorways, railings, work surfaces, seating, shelves, fixtures, walking distances, and other features that fit well to the average person.

Humans also interact with their environments based on their sensory capabilities. The fields of human perception systems, like perceptual psychology and cognitive psychology, are not exact sciences, because human information processing is not a purely physical act, and because perception is affected by cultural factors, personal preferences, experiences, and expectations:

I avoid the issue of big versus small. I think the appropriate scale is the human scale. You don't apply a ruler to that. The human scale can be very large and monumental in certain cases; witness many of the great monuments in Europe: cathedrals, piazzas and squares. Piazza San Marco in Venice is a huge, monumental space and yet it has a real human scale and it works in a human sense. Size is not the issue.

— Leslie M. Freudenheim, Calthorpe: Ignoring Sprawl May Destroy Us All

So human scale in architecture can also describe buildings with sightlines, acoustic properties, task lighting, ambient lighting, and spatial grammar that fit well with human senses. However, one important caveat is that human perceptions are always going to be less predictable and less measurable than physical dimensions.

Human scale in architecture is deliberately violated:

- for monumental effect. Buildings, statues, and memorials are constructed in a scale larger than life as a social/cultural signal that the subject matter is also larger than life. One example is the Rodina (Motherland) statue in Volgograd.
- for aesthetic effect. Many architects, particularly in the Modernist movement, design buildings that prioritize structural purity and clarity of form over concessions to human scale. This became the dominant American architectural style for decades. Some notable examples among many are Henry Cobb's John Hancock Tower in Boston, much of I. M. Pei's work including the Dallas City Hall, and Mies van der Rohe's Neue Nationalgalerie in Berlin.
- to serve automotive scale. Commercial buildings that are designed to be legible from roadways assume a radically different shape. The human eye can distinguish about 3 objects or features per second. A pedestrian steadily walking along a 30-metre (100 ft) length of department store can perceive about 68 features; a driver passing the same frontage at 50 km/h (14 m/s; 31 mph) can perceive about six or seven features. Auto-scale buildings tend to be smooth and shallow, readable at a glance, simplified, presented outward, and with signage with bigger letters and fewer words. This urban form is traceable back to the innovations of developer A. W. Ross along Wilshire Boulevard in Los Angeles in 1920.

== See also ==
- Anthropic principle
- Anthropic units
- Anthropometrics
- Ergonomics
- Leopold Kohr
- List of human-based units of measure
- Scales of measurement
- Small Is Beautiful
- Standard temperature and pressure
- Urban vitality
- Walkability
