= Finger tip unit =

Unit of ointment dosage in Medicine

In medicine, a finger tip unit (FTU) is defined as the amount of ointment, cream or other semi-solid dosage form expressed from a tube with a 5 mm (0.20 in) diameter nozzle, applied from the distal skin-crease to the tip of the index finger of an adult. The "distal skin-crease" is the skin crease over the joint nearest the end of the finger. One FTU is enough to treat an area of skin twice the size of the flat of an adult's hand with the fingers together, i.e. a "handprint". Two FTUs are approximately equivalent to 1 g of topical steroid.

One handprint is 0.8% (i.e. approximately 1%) of the total body surface area, and one FTU covers approximately two handprints. As two FTUs are approximately equivalent to 1g of topical application, the "Rule of Hand" states that "4 hand areas = 2 FTU = 1 g".

In the original study in the UK, one FTU weighed 0.49 g in men and 0.43 g in women. The area covered by one FTU was 312 cm^{2} (48.4 in^{2}) in men and 257 cm^{2} (39.8 in^{2}) in women. Very similar results were found in a Mexico study. The weight of an FTU has been recalculated in Japan, relating to the use of 5 g tubes of ointment with a much smaller nozzle diameter. The weight of ointment is less if the nozzle diameter is smaller than the standard 5 mm.

When a topical drug was used as a foam, the weight of an FTU was 52.5 μg: the area covered by one foam FTU was less than that of an FTU of cream.

== Clinical use of FTU in patients ==
The FTU is particularly useful when counseling patients with regards to the amount of topical steroid cream they should be applying in order to minimize the side-effects which are associated with their use. The FTU can also be used in children.

The FTU concept has been used as a central part of an education programme for parents of children with atopic eczema.

The use of the FTU has been advocated to reduce the variation in usage of topical steroids and to encourage adherence to therapy. The FTU can also be used to guide the use of topical sunscreens.

== Guidelines recommending use of FTU ==
Dermatology Working Groups in the UK and in Poland have recommended that guidance for use of topical corticosteroids in patient information leaflets should include clear FTU instructions, preferably with images of a FTU and a chart to show the number of units required for specific areas of the body. US guidelines of care for the management of psoriasis with topical therapies include guidance of amount to be used based on the FTU.

European Guidelines for the treatment of atopic eczema recommend that application amount of topical anti-inflammatory therapy should follow the FTU rule. In the US it has been recommended that the FTU should be used as part of the treatment plan and communication with patients and caregivers of children with atopic eczema.

== Use of FTU in research ==
The FTU has been used to standardize the amount of cream being applied in clinical research studies in the UK, Belgium, Turkey, India, Iran, Pakistan, Malaysia, and the US.

== See also ==
- Finger (unit)
- Digit (unit)
