= Eckhard Unger =

Eckhard Unger (Landsberg an der Warthe, 11 April 1884 – 24 July 1966) was a German assyriologist.

Unger who was the curator of the Istanbul museum described the remains of Balawat Gates that are still in the Istanbul Museum. Unger was fully aware that the major parts of the gates were in London and Paris as he had visited both locations and discussed them with the respective curators.

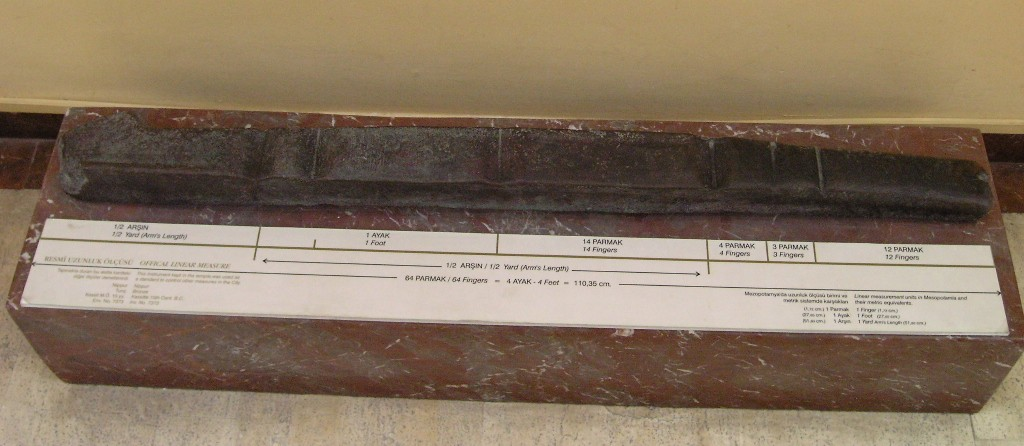
The Nippur cubit-rod in the Archeological Museum of Istanbul, Turkey

In 1916, as curator of the Archeological Museum of Istanbul, he identified and described a copper-alloy object in the museum collection as an ell or measuring rod from Nippur. Dating to the first half of the third millennium BC or even earlier, possibly the oldest known measuring device, it supposedly defines the Sumerian cubit at about 518.6 millimetres. During World War I he made a first detailed research in Basilica cistern (yerebatan Sarnıcı) at İstanbul.

== Published works ==
The many published works of Eckhard Unger include among others:

- Zum Bronzetor von Balawat. Beiträge zur Erklärung und Deutung der assyrischen Inschriften und Reliefs Salmanassars III (thesis) Leipzig: Eduard Pfeiffer 1913
- Zwei babylonische Antiken aus Nippur [s.l.] 1916. (Publikationen der Kaiserlich Osmanischen Museen)
- Katalog der babylonischen und assyrischen Sammlung Kaiserlich osmanische Museen Istanbul: Ihsan 1918
- Die Wiederherstellung des Bronzetores von Balawat [Leipzig]: [Hinrichs], 1920
- Welt und Mensch im alten Orient Berlin: Witting [n.d.]
- Hettitische und aramäische kunst [Berlin] [1923]
- Sumerische und akkadische Kunst Breslau: Hirt 1926
- Assyrische und Babylonische Kunst Breslau: Hirt 1927
- Das Stadtbild von Assur Leipzig: Hinrichs 1929 (Der alte Orient, 27:3)
- Babylon. Die heilige Stadt nach der Beschreibung der Babylonier 1931 (2nd ed. Berlin: De Gruyter 1970)
