= Cambodian units of measurement =

Units of measurement used in Cambodia

A number of units of measurement have been used in Cambodia to measure length, mass, volume, etc.

The metric system is compulsory in Cambodia since 1914.

== Older units, before the metric system ==
=== Length ===
Several units were used to measure length. One muoi (or mot thuoc) was equal to 1 metre. Some other units are given below:.

1 phyeam = 2 muoi = 2 m

1 sen = 20 phyeam = 40 muoi = 40 m

1 yoch = 400 sen = 16,000 muoi = 16 km

==== Cham am ====
The cham am is a unit of length, used during the 18th–20th century in Cambodia. It is equivalent to 12 thneap or 25 centimetres (9.8 in).

==== Thneap ====
The thneap is a unit of length, used during 18th – 20th century in Cambodia. It is equal to 1/12 cham am, 2 1/12 cm or about 20.8333 mm.

=== Weight ===
Several units were used to measure mass. One muoi (mot dong can tay) was equal to 0.600 kg. Some other units are given below:

1 lin = 3/80 muoi = 22.5 g

1 hun = 10 lin = 3/8 muoi = 225 g

1 chin = 10 hun = 3 3/4 muoi = 2.25 kg

1 tael = 10 chin = 37 1/2 muoi = 22.5 kg

1 neal = 16 tael = 360 kg

1 pram roi (not can tay) = 1000 muoi = 600 kg

1 chong = 50 neal = 30,000 muoi = 18 t

1 hap (picul) = 20 chong = 600,000 muoi = 360 t

=== Capacity ===
Several units were used to measure capacity. One sesep (vuong mot gia) was equal to 40 litres. Some other units are given below:

1 muoi (vuong mot ba tay) = 1/40 sesep = 1 L

1 kantang = 3/16 sesep = 7.5 L

1 tao = 2 kantang = 3/8 sesep = 15 L

1 thang = 2 tao = 3/4 sesep = 30 L

== Metric system ==
=== Length ===
Metric system has been compulsory with the name muoi mètre for meter.

=== Mass ===
Metric system has been compulsory with the following names:

1 muoi gram = 1 g

1 hocsep = 60 kg.

=== Capacity ===
Metric system has been compulsory with the following names:

1 muoi litre = 1 L

1 sêsep litre = 40 L.
