= Ancient Mesopotamian units of measurement =

Sumerian Metrology

Ancient Mesopotamian units of measurement originated in the loosely organized city-states of Early Dynastic Sumer. Each city, kingdom and trade guild had its own standards until the formation of the Akkadian Empire when Sargon of Akkad issued a common standard. This standard was improved by Naram-Sin, but fell into disuse after the Akkadian Empire dissolved. The standard of Naram-Sin was readopted in the Ur III period by the Nanše Hymn which reduced a plethora of multiple standards to a few agreed-upon common groupings. Successors to Sumerian civilization including the Babylonians, Assyrians, and Persians continued to use these groupings. Akkado-Sumerian metrology has been reconstructed by applying statistical methods to compare Sumerian architecture, architectural plans, and issued official standards such as Statue B of Gudea and the bronze cubit of Nippur.

== Archaic system ==
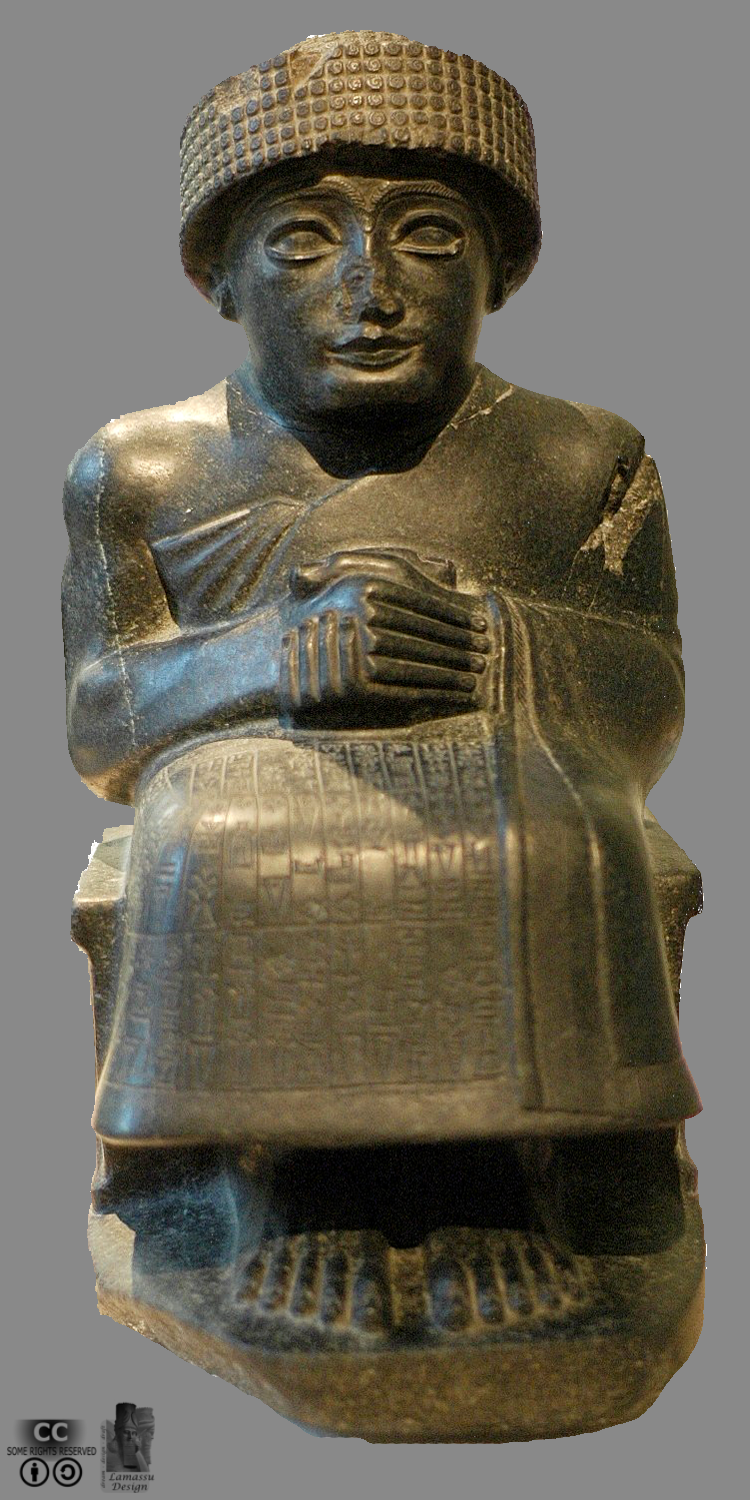
Gudea Statue I carved diorite

The systems that would later become the classical standard for Mesopotamia were developed in parallel with writing in Sumer during Late Uruk Period (c. 3500–3000). Studies of protocuneiform indicate twelve separate counting systems used in Uruk IV-III. Seven of these were also used in the contemporary Proto-Elamite writing system. The bisexagesimal systems went out of use after the Early Dynastic I/II period.

- Sexagesimal System S used to count slaves, animals, fish, wooden objects, stone objects, containers.
- Sexagesimal System S' used to count dead animals, certain types of beer
- Bisexagesimal System B used to count cereal, bread, fish, milk products
- Bisexagesimal System B^{*} used to count rations
- GAN_{2} System G used to count field measurement
- ŠE system Š used to count barley by volume
- ŠE system Š' used to count malt by volume
- ŠE system Š" used to count wheat by volume
- ŠE System Š^{*} used to count barley groats
- EN System E used to count weight
- U_{4} System U used to count calendrics
- DUG_{b} System Db used to count milk by volume
- DUG_{c} System Db used to count beer by volume

In Early Dynastic Sumer (c. 2900–2300 BCE) metrology and mathematics were indistinguishable and treated as a single scribal discipline. The idea of an abstract number did not yet exist, thus all quantities were written as metrological symbols and never as numerals followed by a unit symbol. For example there was a symbol for one-sheep and another for one-day but no symbol for one. About 600 of these metrological symbols exist, for this reason archaic Sumerian metrology is complex and not fully understood. In general however, length, volume, and mass are derived from a theoretical standard cube, called 'gur (also spelled kor in some literature)', filled with barley, wheat, water, or oil. However, because of the different specific gravities of these substances combined with dual numerical bases (sexagesimal or decimal), multiple sizes of the gur-cube were used without consensus. The different gur-cubes are related by proportion, based on the water gur-cube, according to four basic coefficients and their cubic roots. These coefficients are given as:

- Komma = 80/81 correction when planning rations with a 360-day year
- Leimma = 24/25 conversion from decimal to a sexagesimal number system
- Diesis = 15/16
- Euboic = 5/6

One official government standard of measurement of the archaic system was the Cubit of Nippur (2650 BCE). It is a Euboic Mana + 1 Diesis (432 grams). This standard is the main reference used by archaeologists to reconstruct the system.

== Classical system ==
Royal Gur Cube of Naram-Sin

A major improvement came in 2150 BCE during the Akkadian Empire under the reign of Naram-Sin when the competing systems were unified by a single official standard, the royal gur-cube. His reform is considered the first standardized system of measure in Mesopotamia. The royal gur-cube (Cuneiform: LU_{2}.GAL.GUR, 𒈚𒄥; Akkadian: šarru kurru) was a theoretical cuboid of water approximately 6 m × 6 m × 0.5 m from which all other units could be derived. The Neo-Sumerians continued use of the royal gur-cube as indicated by the Letter of Nanse issued in 2000 BCE by Gudea. Use of the same standard continued through the Neo-Babylonian Empire, Neo-Assyrian Empire, and Achaemenid Empire.

=== Length ===
Units of length are prefixed by the logogram DU (𒁺) a convention of the archaic period counting system from which it was evolved. Basic length was used in architecture and field division.

Basic Length
Unit	Ratio	Sumerian	Akkadian	Cuneiform
grain	1/180	še	uţţatu	𒊺
finger	1/30	šu-si	ubānu	𒋗𒋛
foot	2/3	šu-du_{3}-a	šīzu	𒋗𒆕𒀀
cubit	1	kuš_{3}	ammatu	𒌑
step	2	ĝiri_{3}	šēpu	𒈨𒊑
reed	6	gi	qanû	𒄀
rod	12	nindan	nindanu	𒃻
cord	120	eše_{2}	aslu	𒂠

Distance units were geodectic as distinguished from non-geodectic basic length units. Sumerian geodesy divided latitude into seven zones between equator and pole.

Distance
Unit	Ratio	Sumerian	Akkadian	Cuneiform
rod	1/60	nidan	nindanu	𒃻
cord	1/6	eše_{2}	aslu	𒂠
cable	1	uš	uš	𒍑
league	30	da-na	bêru	𒁕𒈾

The cable is approximately equal to 357.8 metres or 360 steps.

=== Area ===
The GAN_{2} system G counting system evolved into area measurements. A special unit measuring brick quantity by area was called the brick-garden (Cuneiform: SIG.SAR 𒊬𒋞; Sumerian: šeg_{12}-sar; Akkadian: libittu-mūšaru) which held 720 bricks.

Basic Area
Unit	Ratio	Dimensions	Sumerian	Akkadian	Cuneiform
shekel	1/144	1 kuš_{3} × 1 kuš_{3}	gin_{2}	šiqlu	𒂆
garden	1	12 kuš_{3} × 12 kuš_{3}	sar	mūšaru	𒊬
quarter-field	25	60 kuš_{3} × 60 kuš_{3}	uzalak	?	𒀺
half-field	50	120 kuš_{3} × 60 kuš_{3}	upu	ubû	𒀹𒃷
field	100	120 kuš_{3} × 120 kuš_{3}	iku	ikû	𒃷
estate	1800		bur	būru	𒁓

The garden is equal to approximately 36 square metres.

=== Capacity or volume ===
Capacity was measured by either the ŠE system Š for dry capacity or the ŠE system Š^{*} for wet capacity.

Basic Volume
Unit	Ratio	Sumerian	Akkadian	Cuneiform
shekel	1/60	gin_{2}	šiqlu	𒂆
bowl	1	sila_{3}	qû	𒋡
vessel	10	ban_{2}	sutū	𒑏
bushel	60	ba-ri_{2}-ga (barig)	parsiktu	𒁀𒌷𒂵
gur-cube	300	gur	kurru	𒄥

A sila was about 1 liter.

=== Mass or weight ===
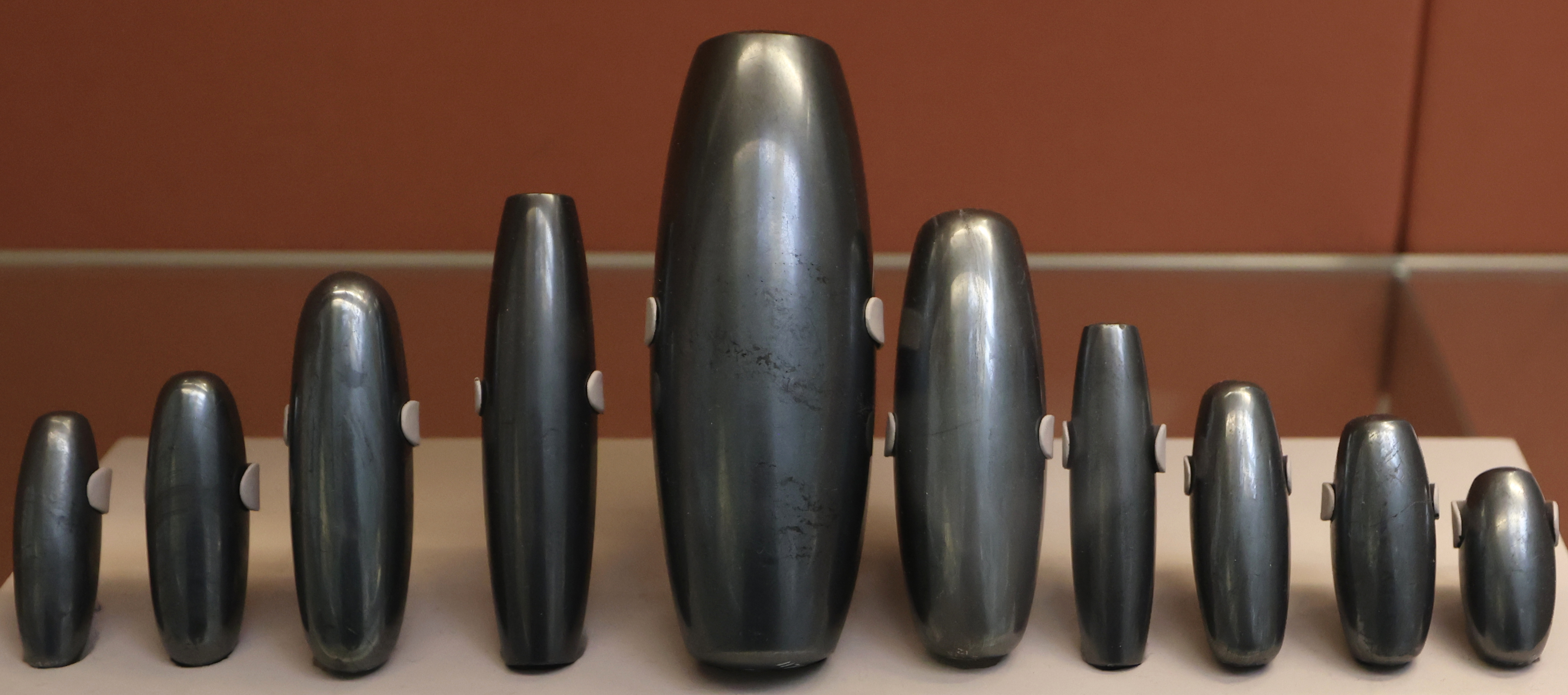
A series of old Babylonian weights ranging from 1 mina to 3 shekels

Mass was measured by the EN system E

Values below are an average of weight artifacts from Ur and Nippur. The ± value represents 1 standard deviation. All values have been rounded to second digit of the standard deviation.

Basic Mass
Unit	Ratio	Mean Value	Sumerian	Akkadian	Cuneiform
grain	1/180	46.6±1.9 mg	še	uţţatu	𒊺
shekel	1	8.40±0.34 g	gin_{2}	šiqlu	𒂆
mina	60	504±20 g	ma-na	manû	𒈠𒈾
talent	3,600	30.2±1.2 kg	gun_{2}	biltu or kakaru	𒄘

=== Time ===
In the Archaic System time notation was written in the U_{4} System U. Multiple lunisolar calendars existed; however the civil calendar from the holy city of Nippur (Ur III period) was adopted by Babylon as their civil calendar. The calendar of Nippur dates to 3500 BCE and was itself based on older astronomical knowledge of an uncertain origin. The main astronomical cycles used to construct the calendar were the month, year, and day.

Basic Time
Unit	Ratio	Sumerian	Akkadian	Cuneiform
gesh	1/360	mu-eš	geš	𒈬𒍑
watch	1/12	da-na	bêru	𒂆
day	1	ud	immu	𒌓
month	30	itud	arhu	𒌗
year	360	mu	šattu	𒈬

== Relationship to other metrologies ==
The Classical Mesopotamian system formed the basis for Elamite, Hebrew, Urartian, Hurrian, Hittite, Ugaritic, Phoenician, Babylonian, Assyrian, Persian, Arabic, and Islamic metrologies. The Classical Mesopotamian System also has a proportional relationship, by virtue of standardized commerce, to Bronze Age Harappan and Egyptian metrologies.

== See also ==
- Assyrian lion weights
- Babylonian mathematics
- Historical weights and measures
- Weights and measures
