= Span (unit) =

Hand-based measurement

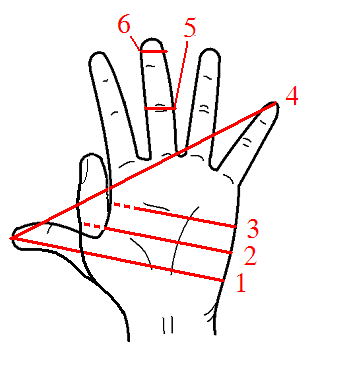
Some hand-based measurements, including the great span (4)

A span is the distance measured by a human hand, from the tip of the thumb to the tip of the little finger. In ancient times, a span was considered to be half a cubit. Sometimes the distinction is made between the great span or full span (thumb to little finger) and little span or short span (thumb to index finger, or index finger to little finger).

== History ==
Ancient Greek texts show that the span was used as a fixed measure in ancient Greece since at least archaic period. The word spithame (Greek: "σπιθαμή"), "span", is attested in the work of Herodotus in the 5th century BC; however, the span was used in Greece long before that, since the word trispithamos (Greek: "τρισπίθαμος"), "three spans long", occurs as early as the 8th century BC in Hesiod.

== Size of the span ==
=== Biblical usage ===
1 span
= 9 inches
= 22.86 cm

=== Chinese usage ===
In China and Chinese cultured countries, a span (一拃) refers to the distance between the tip of the thumb and the tip of the outstretched index finger (sometimes middle finger), and typically measures 15–20 cm (5.9–7.9 in).

=== Arabic usage ===
In Arabic, the analogue of the great span is the šibr (شبر). It is used in Modern Standard Arabic and classical Arabic, as well as in modern-day dialects.

=== Slavic usage ===
In Slavic languages, the analogue of the span is various words derived from Proto-Slavic *pędь (Bulgarian педя, Polish piędź, Russian пядь, Serbian педаљ, Slovenian ped, etc.). In various Slavic languages it is the distance from the tip of the thumb to the tip of the little finger or index finger. For example, Slovenian velika ped = great span (23 cm (9.1 in)), mala ped = little span (9.5 cm (3.7 in)); Russian piad = 4 vershoks = 17.8 cm (7.0 in).

=== African usage ===
In Swahili, the equivalent of the great span (thumb to little finger) is the shubiri or shibiri while the little span (thumb to forefinger) is the morita or futuri.

=== Hungarian usage ===
In Hungarian, the span, or arasz, is occasionally used as an informal measure and occurs in two varieties: measured between the tips of the extended thumb and index finger, it is kis arasz (the "small arasz"); between the tips of the thumb and little finger, it is nagy arasz (the "large arasz"). The term "arasz," used by itself without a modifier, is usually understood as referring to the "large arasz," i.e., to the "span."

=== South Asian usage ===
In Hindi-Urdu and other languages of Northern India and Pakistan, the span is commonly used as an informal measure and called bālisht (Urdu: بالشت, Hindi: बालिश्त).

In Bengali, it is called bighāt (বিঘত or বিঘৎ).

In Marathi, it is called weet (वीत).

In Nepal, where this method of measurement is still used in informal context, a span is called bhitta.

In Tamil, it is called saaN.

=== Southeast Asian usage ===
In Southeast Asia, the span is used as an informal measure.

In Malay and Indonesian, it is called jengkal.

In Thai, it is called khuep.

In Filipino, it is called dangkal.

=== Mongolian usage ===
The span is commonly used as a traditional and informal measure in Mongolia, where it is called tuu (төө). Depending on the use of index or middle finger and the placement of the thumb, the span is named differently as tuu (төө) and mukhar tuu (мухар төө) etc.

=== Portuguese usage ===
The old Portuguese customary unit analogue to the span was the palmo de craveira or simply palmo.

1 palmo de craveira = 8 polegadas (Portuguese inches) = 1/5 varas (Portuguese yards) = 0.22 m (8.7 in)

== See also ==
- Anthropic units
- Hand (unit)
- List of human-based units of measurement
- List of unusual units of measurement
- Units of measure
