= Finger (unit) =

Width of knuckle of middle finger

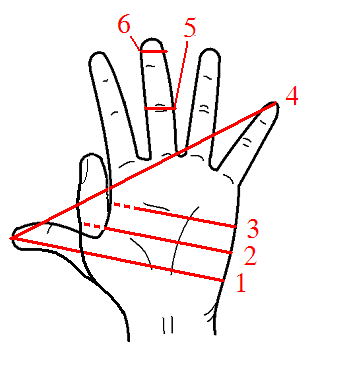
Some hand-based measurements, including the finger.

A chart of Imperial and US customary units.

A finger (sometimes fingerbreadth or finger's breadth) is any of several units of length that are approximately the width of an adult human finger. Exactly which part of the finger should be used is not defined; the width at the base of fingernail (#6 in the sketch) is typically less than that at the knuckle (#5).

The digit, also known as digitus or digitus transversus (Latin), dactyl (Greek) or dactylus, or finger's breadth – 3/4 of an inch or 1/16 of a foot (about 2 cm).

In medicine and related disciplines (anatomy, radiology, etc.) the fingerbreadth (literally the width of a finger) is an informal but widely used unit of measure.

In the measurement of distilled spirits, a finger of whiskey refers to the amount of whiskey that would fill a glass to the level of one finger wrapped around the glass at the bottom.

Another definition (from Noah Webster): "nearly an inch." "Finger" is also the name for a longer unit used historically in cloth measurement to mean one eighth of a yard or 4 1/2 inches. (114.3 mm) Again, which finger and whose finger, is not defined.

These units have no legal status but remain in use for 'rough and ready' comparisons.

== See also ==
- Digit (unit) – Unit of length ('6' in the diagram above)
- Finger tip unit – Unit of ointment dosage in Medicine
- English units of measurement – System of units formerly used in England (before 1826)
- Imperial units – System of measurements (from 1826)
- United States customary units – Units of measurement commonly used in the U.S.
