= Anthropic units =

Academic term in archaeology, social studies and measurement

The term anthropic unit (from Greek άνθρωπος, 'human') is used with different meanings in archaeology, in measurement and in social studies.

== In archaeology ==
In archaeology, anthropic units are strata or deposits of material containing a high proportion of man-made detritus. For example:

"… 'degraded anthropic units', i.e., deposits produced by weathering and decay of fired bricks and mixed fill with non-selected inclusions …"

— Massimo Vidale (1990)

== In measurement ==
Following the coinage of the term "anthropic principle" by Brandon Carter in 1973–1974, units of measurement that are on a human scale are occasionally referred to as "anthropic units", as the example here:

"… the metre and kilogram occupy a reasonably central position as far as symmetry in positive and negative powers of ten is concerned, emphasising that the SI units are natural anthropic units …"

— Brian William Petley (1985)

== In social studies ==
In fields of study such as sociology and ethnography, anthropic units are identifiable groupings of people. For example:

"Ethnographers have been accustomed to deal with the 'race', the 'tribe' and the 'nation' as social or anthropic units …"

— J. J. Thomson (1896)

and:

"... among the more primitive anthropic units it seems a grave ineptitude for the Chukchees not to adopt the snowhouse building complex from the neighboring Eskimos"

— Jacob Robert Kantor (1944)
