= Kuntz =

Kuntz is a German surname. The name originated as a short form of Konrad meaning "bold adviser", or being "crafty" in German. In Yiddish the word is associated with a clever trick. In the Kashubian (Kaszëbë) area name Kuntz comes from kashubian language name "Kunc" also "Kunz" means last farmer or farmer at the end of the road. The surname is frequent around Puck where during the Prussian occupation name was frequently changed from Slavonic sound kunc (polish koniec) to Kunz or Kuntz. This type of change of names was frequent for all Kashubian names like Lesna to Lesnau, Piontka to Piontke, etc. Notable people with the surname include:

- Alan Kuntz (1919–1987), Canadian ice hockey player
- Albert Kuntz (1896–1945), German communist politician and concentration camp victim
- Andy Kuntz (born 1962), German progressive metal singer
- Bobby Kuntz (died 2011), Canadian football linebacker
- Harry Kuntz (died 1973), Canadian politician
- Joana Kuntz, professor of psychology in New Zealand
- Júlio Kuntz, Brazilian footballer
- Marcel Kuntz, French plant biologist
- Murray Kuntz (born 1945), Canadian ice hockey right winger
- Robert J. Kuntz (born 1955), American game designer
- Roger Kuntz (died 1975), American landscape painter
- Rose Dieng-Kuntz (1956–2008), Senegalese French computer scientist
- Russell "Rusty" Kuntz (born 1955), American baseball player
- Stefan Kuntz (born 1962), German footballer
- Terry Kuntz (born 1953), American game designer
- Thomas Kuntz (born 1965), American multi-media artist
- Tom Kuntz (born 1972), American filmmaker
- Zack Kuntz (born 1999), American football player

== See also ==
- Cuntz, a surname
- Kuntze, surname
- Kunze, a surname
- Counts, a surname
