= Stadion (unit) =

Ancient Greek unit of length

The stadion (plural stadia, Ancient Greek: στάδιον; latinized as stadium; also anglicized as stade) was an ancient Greek unit of length consisting of 600 ancient Greek feet (podes). There are a range of varieties or understandings of what a stadion was and is; these have been calculated by various historians, and those calculations have varied dramatically (as did perhaps the use and meaning of the term stadion over time in ancient Greece). Thus, the exact length of one stadion is not universally agreed upon today: historians estimate it at between 150 and 210 m (490 and 690 ft), with perhaps something of a convergence around the 185 metres (607 ft) length of an Attic stade.

== Calculations ==
According to Herodotus, one stadium was equal to 600 Greek feet (podes). However, the length of the foot varied in different parts of the Greek world, and the length of the stadion has been the subject of argument and hypothesis for hundreds of years.

An empirical determination of the length of the stadion was made by Lev Vasilevich Firsov, who compared 81 possibly inaccurate, non-straight-line distances given by Eratosthenes and Strabo with the straight-line distances measured by modern methods, and averaged the results. He obtained a result of about 157.7 metres (172.5 yd). Various comparator lengths, translating the length of a stadion into modern units of length, have been proposed, and some have been named. Among them are:

Stadion name	Length (approximate)		Description	Proposed by
Stadion name	metres	yards	Description	Proposed by
Itinerary	157 m	172 yd	used in measuring the distance of a journey.	Jean Antoine Letronne, 1816
Olympic	192 m	210 yd	200 Heracles steps	Carl Ferdinand Friedrich Lehmann-Haupt, 1929
Ptolemaic or Attic	185 m	202 yd	600 × 308 mm	Otto Cuntz, 1923; D.R. Dicks, 1960
Babylonian–Persian	196 m	214 yd	600 × 327 mm	Lehmann-Haupt, 1929
Phoenician–Egyptian	209 m	229 yd	600 × 349 mm	Lehmann-Haupt, 1929

Which measure of the stadion is used can affect the interpretation of ancient texts. For example, the error in the calculation of Earth's circumference by Eratosthenes or Posidonius is dependent on which stadion is chosen to be appropriate.

== Other uses ==
From the Middle Ages on, the word stadium has been used as a synonym for the furlong (which is 220 yards, equal to one eighth of a mile), which is of Old English origin.

== See also ==
- Ancient Egyptian units of measurement
- Ancient Greek units of measurement § Length
- Earth's circumference
