= Gelzer =

Gelzer is a surname. Notable people with the surname include:

- Heinrich Gelzer (1847–1906), German classical scholar and writer on Armenian mythology
- Jay Gelzer (1889–1964), American writer
- Johann Heinrich Gelzer (1813–1889), Swiss historian and diplomat, father of Heinrich Gelzer
- Matthias Gelzer (1886–1974), a Swiss-German classical historian, known for his studies of the Roman Republic
