= Cuntz =

Cuntz is a surname. Notable persons with that name include:

- Erich Cuntz (1916–1975), German field hockey player
- Joachim Cuntz (born 1948), German mathematician
- Manfred Cuntz (born 1958), German astrophysicist
- Matthias Cuntz (born 1990), German soccer player
- Otto Cuntz (1865–1932), German-Austrian classical historian

== See also ==
- Kuntz (disambiguation)
- Kuntze, a surname
- Kunze, a surname
