= Dicitanaura =

Dicitanaura or Dikitanaura was a town of ancient Pamphylia. It is mentioned under the name of Diciotanabron or Dikiotanabron (Ancient Greek: Δικιοτανάβρων) in the Notitiae Episcopatuum.

Its site is unlocated.
