= Kunze =

Kunz, Künz, or Kunze is a surname. Notable people with the surname include:

- Kunz (singer) (Marco Kunz, born 1985), Swiss singer
- Adrian Kunz (born 1967), Swiss international footballer
- Alfred Kunz (Catholic priest) (1931–1998), American murdered Catholic priest
- Alfred Kunz (composer) (1929–2019), Canadian composer and conductor
- Andreas Kunz (1946-2022), German skier
- Andreas Kunze (1952-2010), German actor
- Anita Kunz (born 1956), Canadian artist and illustrator
- Charlie Kunz (1896–1958), American pianist
- Dana Kunze, American high diver
- Drew Kunz (born 1969), American poet and artist
- Earl Kunz (1898–1963), American professional baseball pitcher
- Eddie Kunz (born 1986), American professional baseball pitcher
- Eric Kunze (born 1971), American Broadway actor and singer
- Erich Kunz (1909–1995), Austrian operatic baritone
- Ernst Künz (1912–1944), Austrian football (soccer) player
- Eva Kunz (1947-2023), German politician
- Florian Kunz (born 1972), German field hockey player
- George Kunz (born 1947), American football player
- George Frederick Kunz (1856–1932), American mineralogist
- Gustav Kunze (1793–1851), German zoologist, botanist and entomologist whose standard botanical author abbreviation is Kunze
- Hansjörg Kunze (born 1959), German track and field athlete
- Heinrich Kunz (1793–1859), Swiss industrialist
- Heinz Rudolf Kunze (born 1956), German writer and rock singer
- Helmut Kunz, (1910–1976), Nazi doctor
- Janine Kunze (born 1974), German actress and comedian
- John Christopher Kunze (1744–1807), German-American Lutheran pietist theologian
- Johannes Kunze (1903–1943), German World War II prisoner of war
- Johannes Kunze (politician) (1892–1959), German politician
- Kahena Kunze (born 1991), Brazilian sailor, 2 times olympic gold medalist (2016 - Rio, 2020 - Tokyo)
- Kerstin Kunze (born 1971), German chess master
- Michael Kunze (born 1943), German lyricist, book writer and librettist
- Nicolin Kunz (1953–1997), Austrian actress
- Reiner Kunze (born 1933), German writer and GDR dissident
- Richard Kunze (1872-1945), German politician
- Rudibert Kunz (born 1943), German investigator, journalist and television editor
- Rudolf Kunz, German motorcycle road racer
- Terry Kunz (born 1952), American football player
- Stanley H. Kunz (1864–1946), American politician from Illinois
- Stephanie Kunze (born 1970), American politician from Ohio
- Urs Kunz (born 1974), Swiss skier

== See also ==
- Kuntze, a surname
- Cuntz, a surname
- Kuntz (disambiguation)
- Kunze, California, former name of Greenwater, California
- Kunz v. New York, United States Supreme Court case concerning free speech
- 6847 Kunz-Hallstein, main belt asteroid
- Koontz (surname)
