= Apet =

Apet or APET may refer to

- Apet, a former romanization of Egyptian Ipet ("The Nurse"), a hippo-headed protective goddess closely associated or conflated with Taweret
- apet, a former romanization of Egyptian ipet or ip.t, an Ancient Egyptian unit of volume
- APET, an abbreviation of "amorphous polyethylene terephthalate"
