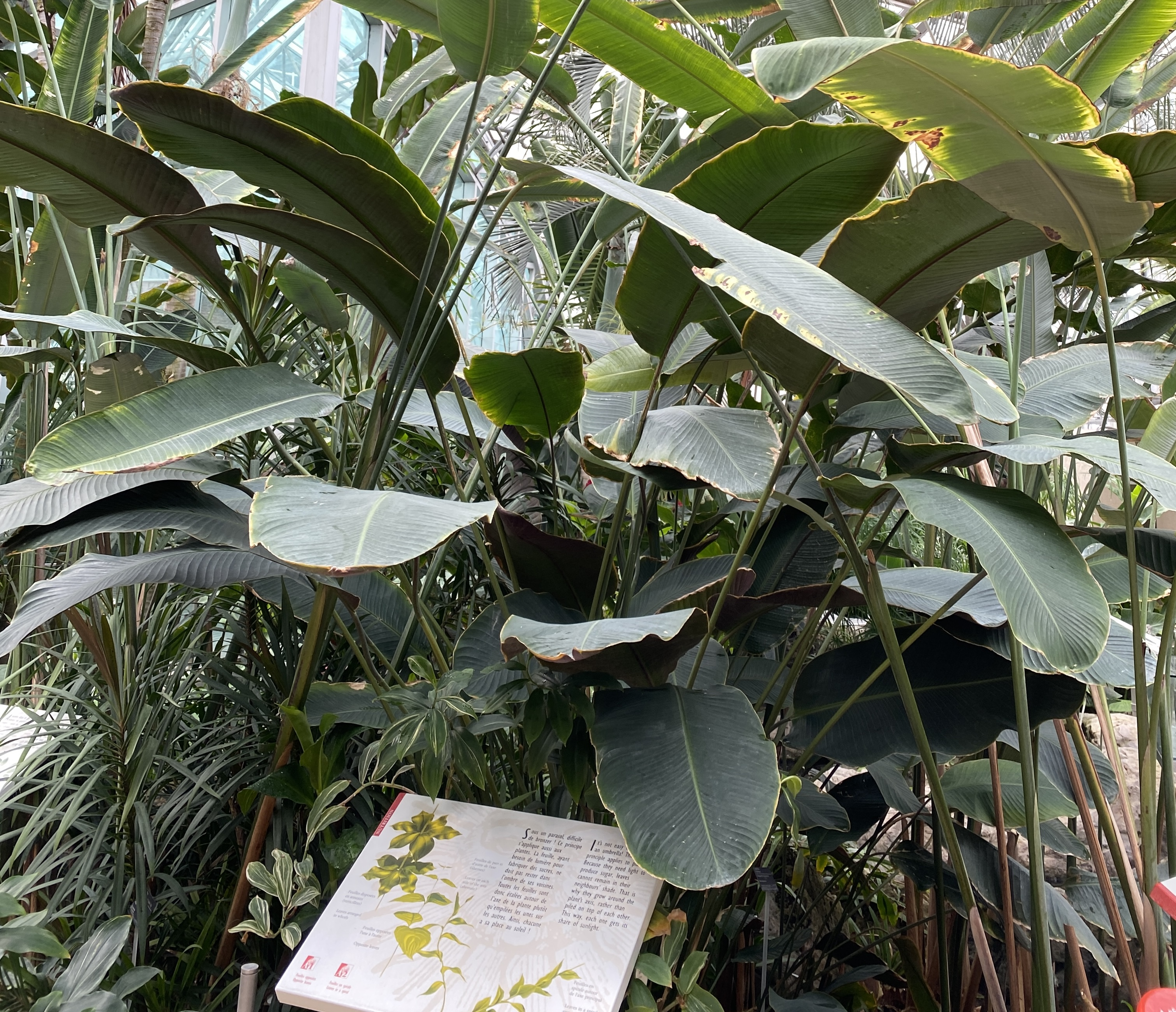

Scientific classification
- Kingdom: Plantae
- Clade: Tracheophytes
- Clade: Angiosperms
- Clade: Monocots
- Clade: Commelinids
- Order: Zingiberales
- Family: Marantaceae
- Genus: Goeppertia
- Species: G. inocephala

Binomial name
- Goeppertia inocephala (Kuntze) Borchs. & S.Suárez

Synonyms
- Calathea inocephala (Kuntze) T.Durand & B.D.Jacks.; Phyllodes inocephala Kuntze

= Goeppertia inocephala =

Species of flowering plant

Goeppertia inocephala is a species of plant in the Marantaceae family which is native to Belize, Colombia, Costa Rica, Ecuador, Guatemala, Honduras, Nicaragua, Panamá, Peru, Trinidad-Tobago, Venezuela, northern Brazil, and southeastern Mexico. This species belong to the sub-group of Goeppertia called the Ornata clade.

== Description ==
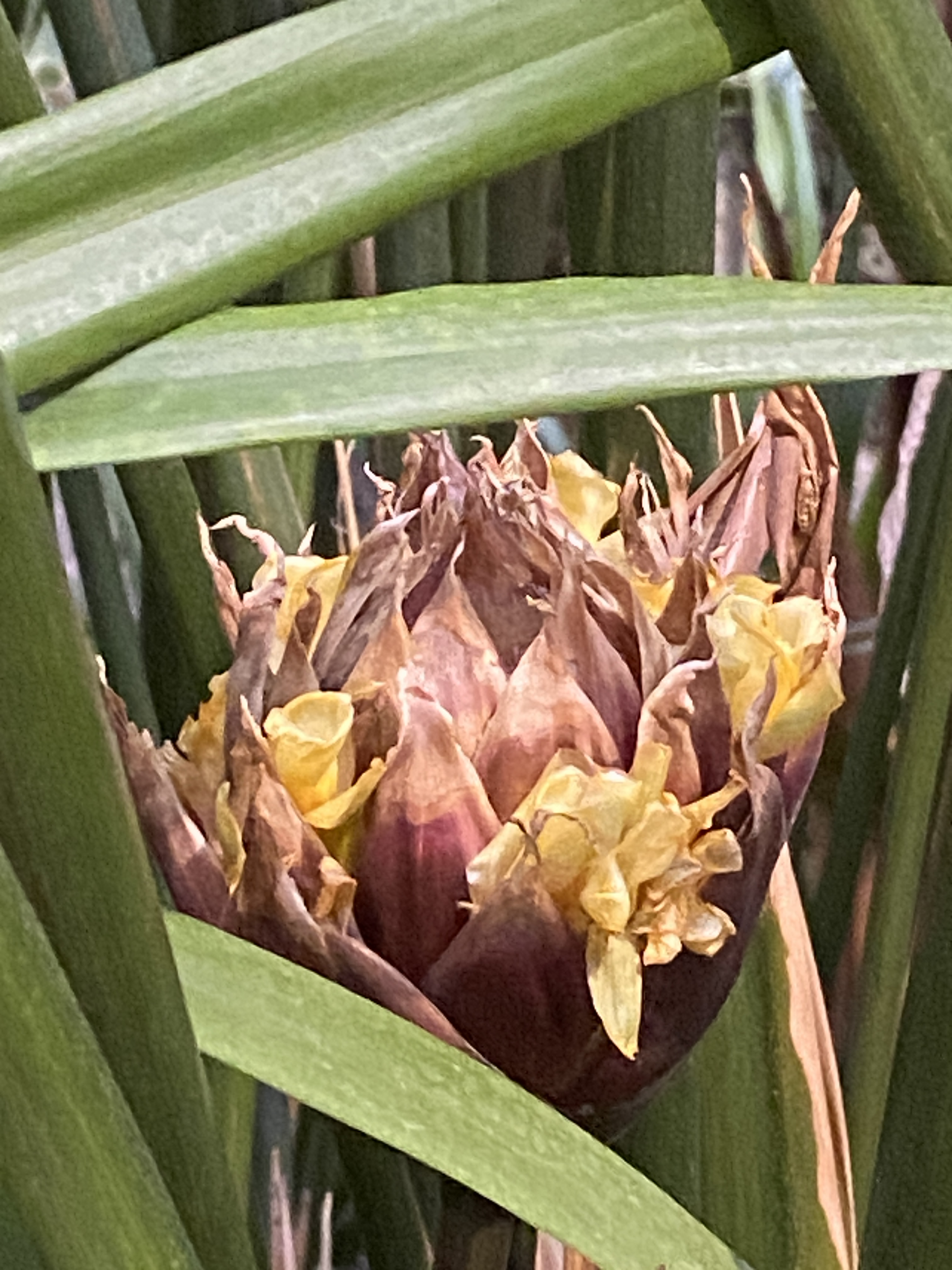
Inflorescence of Goeppertia inocephala

Goeppertia inocephala is one of the biggest species of Goeppertia, with an average height between 1.5 meters and 3 meters. It has huge, ovale, plain green leaves (30–55 cm), with green on the underside, with tall, thick green petioles and a long, green pulvinus. The inflorescence of G.inocephala is composed of multiple bracts spiraly arranged on a thick peduncle. The bracts are usually green and yellow but occasionally can be red due to genetic variation happening in the species. The flowers are usually cream-colored and can vary to yellow. The staminodes are shaped like a small tube, which makes it easy to identify. The inflorescence rapidly rot and becomes a whole ecosystem for insects that can feed on the rotten bracts. This species can sometimes develop a leaf pattern on juvenile leaves. The pattern consists of pink lines above between the lateral veins, which makes this species belong to the Ornata group. When sterile, Goeppertia inocephala may be confused with Calathea lutea, but when fruiting, the fruits make it easily recognizable. It is viviparous.

== Uses ==
In the Amazon, the leaves are used for wrapping food. The Ye'Kwana people of Venezuela use the leaves of Goeppertia inocephala to line baskets for storing mañioco (manioc cereal). They also use the plant as temporary thatching in house construction.
