= Djeser =

Djeser may refer to either of:

- Djeser, an alternative spelling of Djoser, a pharaoh of Egypt's Third Dynasty
- djeser, the ancient Egyptian unit of measurement sometimes equated with the foot
