= Deben (unit) =

Ancient Egyptian weight unit

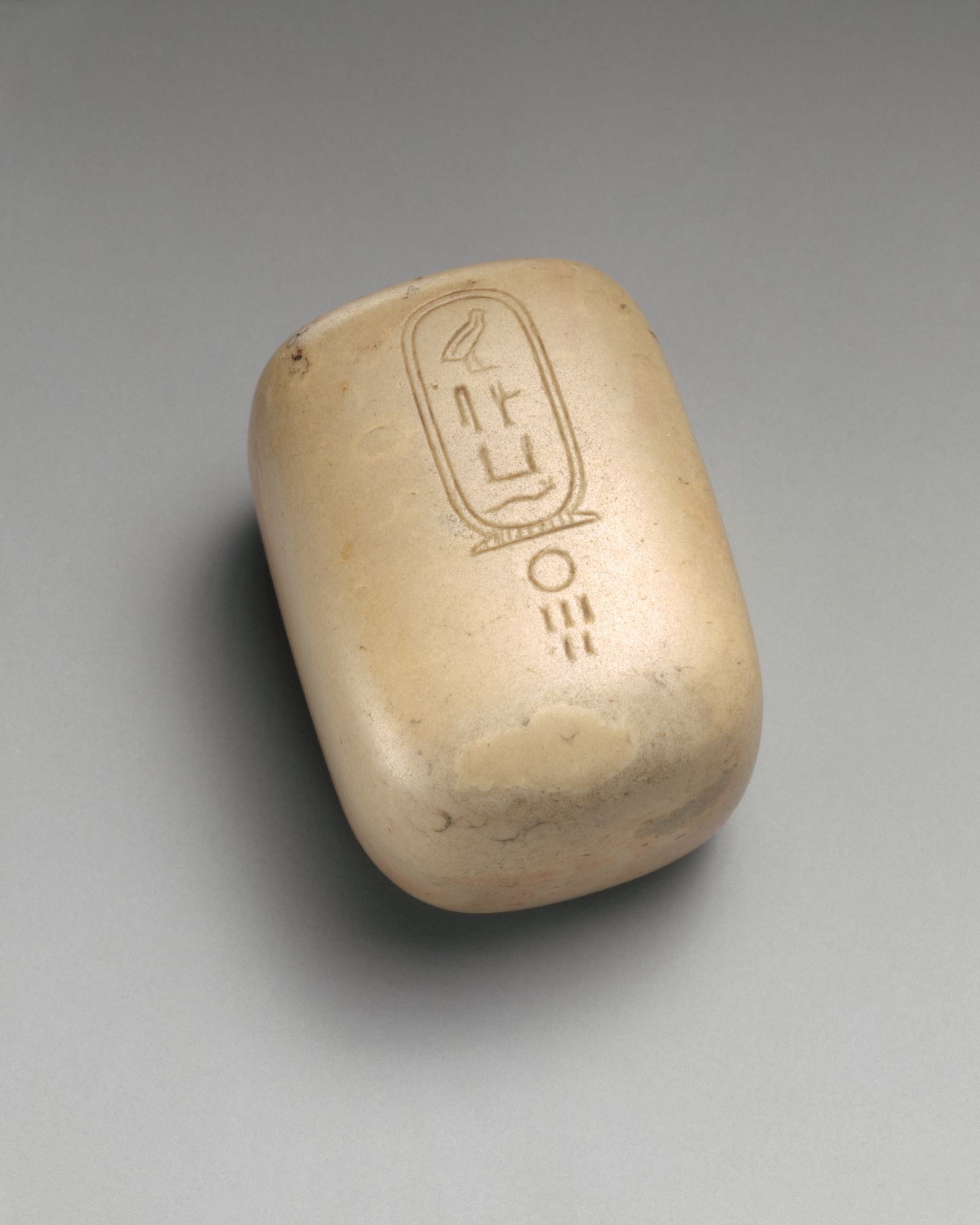
Weight equal to five deben, inscribed with cartouche of Userkaf

The deben was an ancient Egyptian weight unit.

F46 n O39
Deben
(w/"stone-block"–O39)
(as determinative)
(horiz. water-N)
in hieroglyphs

== Early Dynastic Period ==
The earliest evidence for deben is from the Early Dynastic Period. It was found at the site of Buto in Nile Delta. The weighing stone was uncovered in an archaeological context from Second Dynasty, in the so-called "labyrinth" building, it bears the inscription of the "friendly is the heart of Horus, director" (of the installation) "Hemsemenib". The inscribed value is of 3 deben, representing a unit of 29 grams (1.0 oz), likely the earliest copper deben. Based on this evidence, it was argued recently that copper and gold deben were used since Early Dynastic Period in ancient Egypt.

== Old and Middle Kingdom ==
Old Kingdom market scene from the tomb of Fetekti at Abusir South: Two of the customers are seen carrying little boxes on their shoulders, suspected to have contained pieces of metal used as payment

Set of balance beams and weighing stones from 10 to 100 units, likely deben, was painted on the wall of the tomb of Third Dynasty official Hesy-Ra at Saqqara. Stone weights from the Old Kingdom have been found, weighing about 13.6 g (0.48 oz; 0.44 ozt), giving presumed value of the gold deben, e.g. the weighing stone of king Userkaf. The same unit was used for the jasper weighing stone of the First Intermediate Period king Nebkaure Khety. From the Middle Kingdom date deben weight units used for particular metals, referred to as copper deben and gold deben, the former being about twice as heavy (27 g (0.95 oz; 0.87 ozt)) as the latter. Such weights from the Middle Kingdom were discovered at Lisht, using gold deben, and copper deben.

== Second Intermediate Period ==
At the Second Intermediate Period site of Tell el-Dab'a were found sets of sphendonoid weighing stones confirming the use of shekel weighing system, both "Syrian" (9-9.5 g) and "Mesopotamian" (c. 8.1-8.5 g). Here presumably stems the changed weighing system of the New Kingdom, with a completely different deben unit.

== New Kingdom ==
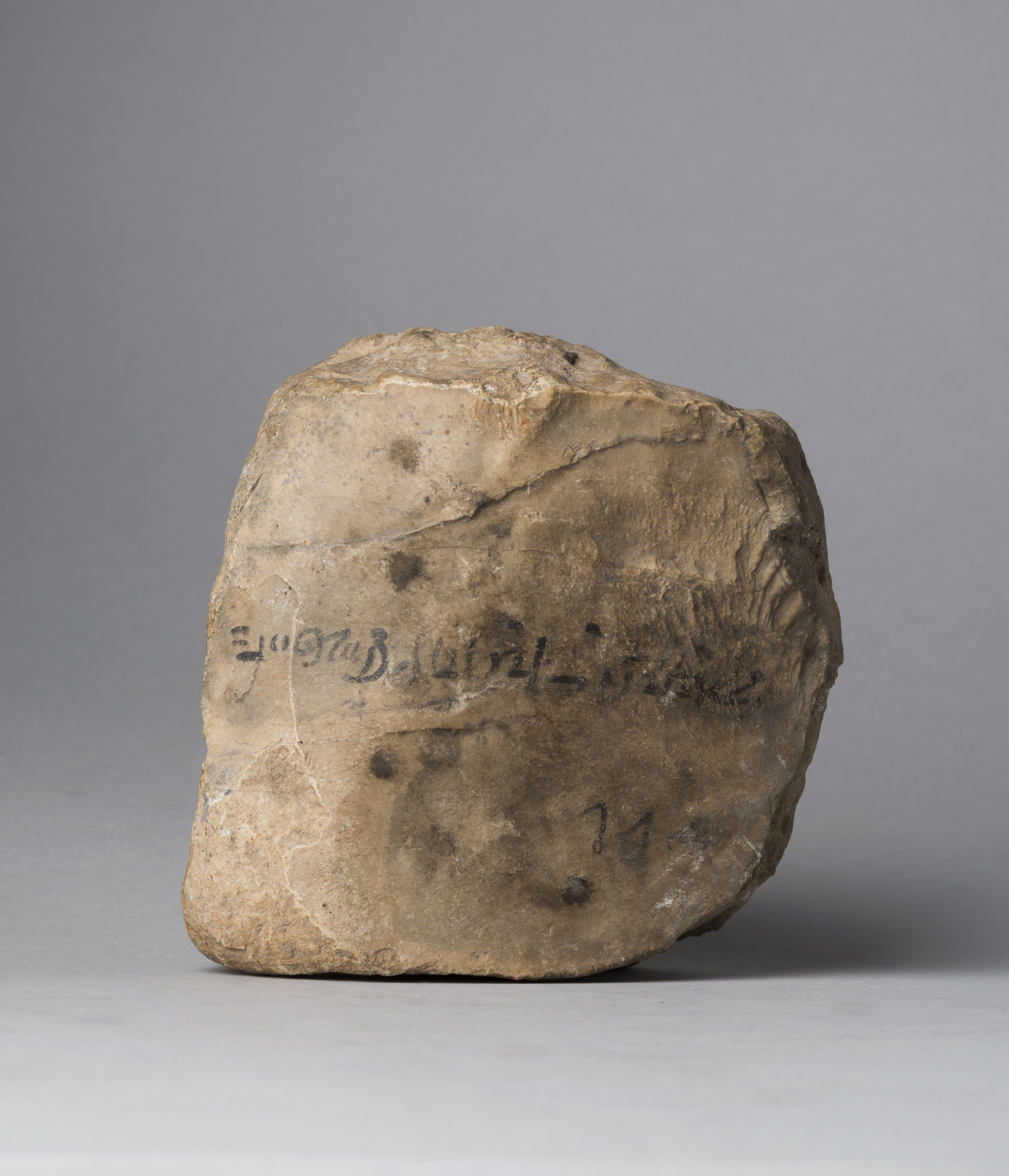
15-deben weight (about 1450 gr.), limestone, New Kingdom, 19th Dynasty–20th Dynasty, 1292–1077 BC, from Deir el-Medina. Museo Egizio, Turin (S. 9651).

From the New Kingdom one deben was equal to about 90 g (3.2 oz; 2.9 ozt) to 95 grams (3.4 oz; 3.1 ozt). It was divided into ten kidet (alt. kit, kite or qedet) of c. 9.0 grams (0.32 oz; 0.29 ozt) to 9.5 grams (0.34 oz; 0.31 ozt), or into what is referred to by Egyptologists as 'pieces', one twelfth of a deben weighing 7.6 g (0.27 oz; 0.24 ozt). It was frequently used to denote value of goods, by comparing their worth to a weight of metal, generally silver or copper. The value of the metal artefacts was expressed by deben, and the weight equalled the value.

== Protocurrency ==
It has been speculated that pieces of metal weighing a deben were kept in boxes, taken to markets, and were used as a means of exchange. Archaeologists have been unable to find any such standardized pieces of precious metal. On the other hand, it is documented that debens served to compare values. On the well-known Juridical stela from the reign of the Sixteenth Dynasty king Nebiryraw I, debt of 60 gold deben (consisting in fact of gold, copper, grain, and clothes as listed on the stela) was worth the governorship of el-Kab. In the 19th Dynasty, a slave girl priced four deben and one kite of silver was paid for with various goods: 6 bronze vessels, 10 deben of copper, 15 linen garments, a shroud, a blanket, and a pot of honey.

== Legacy ==
Deben appeared in the computer game Pharaoh as its currency (in the form of gold).

== See also ==
- Ancient Egyptian units of measurement
- Egyptian units of measurement
