= Robert Kuntz =

Robert Kuntz may refer to:

- Robert J. Kuntz (born 1955), American game designer
- Bobby Kuntz (1932–2011), Canadian football linebacker
