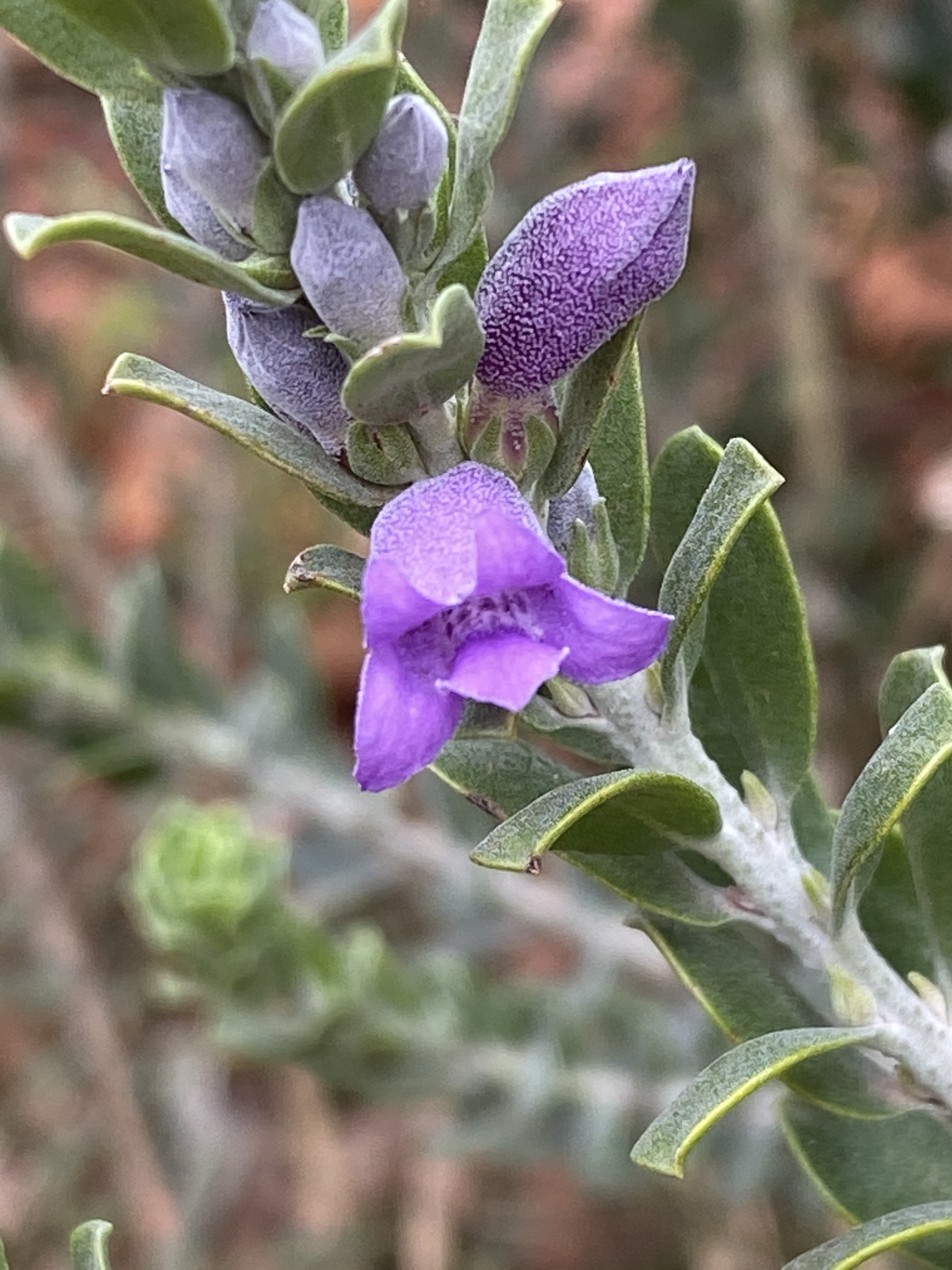
- In Mount Annana Botanic Garden

Conservation status
- Endangered (EPBC Act)

Scientific classification
- Kingdom: Plantae
- Clade: Tracheophytes
- Clade: Angiosperms
- Clade: Eudicots
- Clade: Asterids
- Order: Lamiales
- Family: Scrophulariaceae
- Genus: Eremophila
- Species: E. resinosa

Binomial name
- Eremophila resinosa (Endl.) F.Muell.

Synonyms
- Bondtia resinosa Kuntze orth. var.; Bontia resinosa (Endl.) Kuntze; Eremophila kochi Ewart orth. var.; Eremophila kochii Ewart; Pholidia kochii (Ewart) Kraenzl.; Pholidia resinosa Endl.

= Eremophila resinosa =

Resinous eremophila

Species of flowering plant

Eremophila resinosa, also known as resinous eremophila, is a flowering plant in the figwort family, Scrophulariaceae and is endemic to Western Australia. It is a spreading shrub with sticky young foliage, short leaves, small sepals and mauve, purple or sometimes white flowers.

== Description ==
Eremophila resinosa is a spreading shrub which grows to a height of between 0.4 and 1.0 m (1 and 3 ft) and a width of up to 1.0 m (3 ft). The branches have small, raised, amber-coloured, translucent lumps and a covering of fine, branched hairs. The leaves are lance-shaped to egg-shaped with the narrower end towards the base. They are 6–17 mm (0.2–0.7 in) long, about 2 mm (0.08 in) wide and have fine, branched hairs.

The flowers are borne singly in leaf axils on stalks up to 1 mm (0.04 in) long. There are 5 overlapping, green, tapering, lance-shaped sepals which are 3–5.5 mm (0.1–0.2 in) long. The petals are 13–18 mm (0.5–0.7 in) long and are joined at their lower end to form a tube. They are mauve, purple or sometimes white and when coloured, appear lighter on the outside because of a covering of fine, branched hairs. The inside of the tube is often spotted. The inside surface of the petal lobes is glabrous but the inside of the tube is filled with long hairs. The 4 stamens are fully enclosed in the petal tube. Flowering occurs from May to September and the fruits which follow are dry, oval-shaped with a pointed end, slightly rough and about 4 mm (0.2 in) long.

== Taxonomy and naming ==
The species was first formally described in 1838 by Stephan Endlicher who gave it the name Pholidia resinosa. The description was published in Stirpium Australasicarum Herbarii Hugeliani Decades Tres. In 1860, Ferdinand von Mueller changed the name to Eremophila resinosa and published the change in Papers and Proceedings of the Royal Society of Van Diemen's Land. The specific epithet (resinosa) is a Latin word meaning "full of resin" or "gummy".

== Distribution and habitat ==
Resinous eremophila grows in clay, gravelly and sandy soils in the wheatbelt north-east of Merredin in the Avon Wheatbelt biogeographic region.

== Conservation ==
Eremophila resinosa is listed as "Endangered" (EN) under the Environment Protection and Biodiversity Conservation Act 1999 (EPBC Act). As at April, 2008 it was only known from 26 natural populations and 1418 individual plants. Five clones of the species were grown by tissue culture and planted at Westonia in 2004. Seed was also collected and grown at the same site. Survival rates are high for both the tissue cultured and seed-raised plants. To date, over 4,000 plants are growing and 2 million fruits are in long-term storage.

== Use in horticulture ==
This small shrub can bear masses of purple flowers in spring and its hardiness adds to its potential as a feature plant in a small garden. It is easily propagated from cuttings and grown in a wide range of soils, including clay in full or part shade. It is very drought tolerant, needing little or no watering, even during long droughts and tolerates the most severe frosts.
