= Edward J. Kuntze =

American sculptor

Edward J. Kuntze (Pomerania, Prussia, 1826 – New York City, 10 April 1870) was a sculptor.

He received his artistic education mostly in Stockholm, Sweden, gained the Roman prize in the academy of fine arts there, and subsequently lived for many years in London, England. In 1852 he came to the United States and, devoting himself to his art, achieved a reputation, and was elected an associate of the National Academy of Design in 1869. Among his works are statuettes of William Shakespeare, Johann von Goethe, Washington Irving, Alfred Lord Tennyson, and Abraham Lincoln; a statue of "Psyche," one of "Columbia," "Puck," "Puck on Horseback," and "Puck on the Warpath"; a bust of "Mirth"; "Merlin and Vivien," in bas-relief; and many medallion portraits and busts. His principal work, a statue of the "Indian Minstrel Chiabobos" in Henry Wadsworth Longfellow's Hiawatha, was left unfinished. He exhibited three etchings at the National Academy in 1868, and published a juvenile book, Mystic Bells (New York, 1869).
