= Kuntze =

Kuntze is a surname of German origin. People with that name include:

- Carl Kuntze (1922-2006), Dutch rower who competed at the 1952 Summer Olympics
- Edward J. Kuntze (1826-1870), Prussian-born American sculptor
- Otto Kuntze (1843-1907), German botanist whose standard botanical abbreviation is Kuntze
- Reimar Kuntze (1900-1949), German cinematographer
- Tadeusz Kuntze (1733-1793), Silesian painter
- Walter Kuntze (1883-1960), German general and war criminal
- Wandir Kuntze (born 1950), Brazilian rower who competed at the 1976 and 1980 Summer Olympics

== See also ==
- Kunze, a surname
- Kuntz (disambiguation)
- Cuntz, a surname
