= Heinrich Gelzer =

German classical scholar (1847–1906)

Heinrich Gelzer (1 July 1847 – 11 July 1906) was a German classical scholar. He wrote also on Armenian mythology. He was the son of the Swiss historian Johann Heinrich Gelzer (1813–1889). He became Professor of classical philology and ancient history at the University of Jena, in 1878. He wrote a still-standard work on Sextus Julius Africanus. He worked out the chronology of Gyges of Lydia, from cuneiform evidence, in an 1875 article.

== Works ==
- Sextus Julius Africanus und die byzantinische Chronographie (three volumes) – Sextus Julius Africanus and the Byzantine chronology.
- Georgii Cyprii Descriptio orbis romani (1890).
- Index lectionum Ienae (1892).
- Leontios' von Neapolis Leben des heiligen Johannes des Barmherzigen, Erzbischofs von Alexandrien (1893) – Leontios of Neapolis' life of John the Merciful, Archbishop of Alexandria.
- Geistliches und Weltliches aus dem türkisch-griechischen Orient (1900) – The spiritual and worldly of the Turkish-Greek Orient.
- Ungedruckte und ungenügend veröffentlichte Texte der Nottiae episcopatuum. Ein Beitrag zur byzantinischen Kirchen- und Verwaltungsgeschichte (1901) – Unpublished and incomplete texts of the Notitiae Episcopatuum, a contribution to the Byzantine church and administrative history.
- Vom heiligen Berge und aus Makedonien. Reisebilder aus den Athosklöstern und dem Insurrektionsgebiet (1904) – From the Sacred mountains and from Macedonia; Travel pictures from the Athos monasteries, etc.
- Scriptores sacri et profani ... Bd. 4. Des Stephanos von Taron armenische Geschichte (1907), translation with August Burckhardt.
- Byzantinische Kulturgeschichte (1909) – Byzantine cultural history.
- Patrum nicaenorum nomina, with Heinrich Hilgenfeld and Otto Cuntz.
- Ausgewählte kleine Schriften – Selected smaller writings.
- Der altfranzösische Yderroman (1913), as editor – Old French Yder romance.
