= Eva Kunz =

German politician (1947–2023)

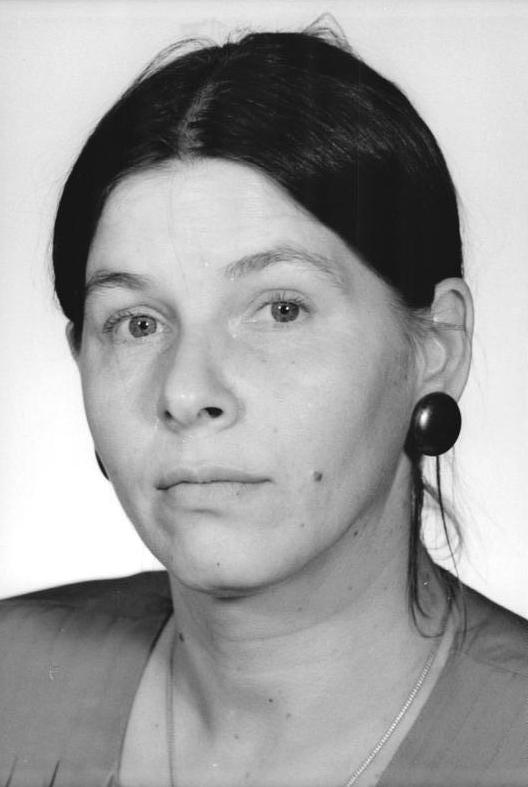
Kunz in 1990

Eva Kunz (4 April 1947 – 17 July 2023) was a German politician.

== Early life and education ==
Kunz was born in Chemnitz, Saxony, then in the Soviet occupation zone in Germany, on 4 April 1947. Her parents were a librarian and a bookseller. She had a degree in psychology and library science from the Humboldt University of Berlin, and worked as a technical assistant at the Humboldt University's Methodischen Zentrum für wissenschaftliche Bibliotheken (Methodological Centre for Scientific Libraries) before becoming caretaker for the French church in Friedrichstadt in East Berlin from 1983 to 1989.

== Political career ==
Kunz was elected chair of the East German Arbeitsgemeinschaft sozialdemokratischer Frauen [Working group of social democratic women] (now SPD-Frauen) in 1990.

She was a member of the East German Volkskammer from the 1990 East German general election on 18 March 1990 until 2 June 1990, resigning to become city councillor for equal opportunities in Greater Berlin. She later became head of the department for labour, women and social affairs in the state of Brandenburg. She worked for women's rights and equality in areas including political participation, education, upbringing, employment and careers.

== Personal life ==
Kunz had two children. Her son was born when she was 20. Her son's father was a student from Guinea, and returned there shortly after the birth; Kunz did not see him again. Her daughter was born in 1971; her father also came from abroad, and when the daughter later travelled to visit her father's country she contracted two forms of malaria and died.

Kunz was diagnosed with dementia and told that she had only a few years of clear-mindedness: she said that she wanted to live those years "ordentlich und fröhlich" (tidily and happily). With a new partner she travelled to Turkey and Egypt, and enjoyed theatre and cinema, before entering a nursing home for the last years of her life and dying on 17 July 2023. Her obituary from the SPD-Frauen described her as a "trailblazer".
