= Notitiae Episcopatuum =

Official document

The Notitiae Episcopatuum (singular: Notitia Episcopatuum) were official documents that furnished for Eastern countries the list and hierarchical rank of the metropolitan and suffragan bishoprics of a church.

== Order of listing ==
In the Roman Church (the mostly Latin Rite 'Western Patriarchate' of Rome), archbishops and bishops were classed according to the seniority of their consecration, and in Africa according to their age. In the Eastern patriarchates, however, the hierarchical rank of each bishop was determined by the see he occupied.

Thus, in the Patriarchate of Constantinople, the first metropolitan was not the longest ordained, but whoever happened to be the incumbent of the see of Caesarea; the second was the archbishop of Ephesus, and so on. In every ecclesiastical province, the rank of each suffragan (see) was thus determined, and remained unchanged unless the list was subsequently modified.

The hierarchical order included first of all the patriarch; then the 'greater metropolitans', i.e., those who had archdioceses with suffragan sees; next 'autocephalous metropolitans', who had no suffragans, and were directly subject to the patriarch; next other archbishops, although not functionally differing from autocephalous metropolitans, whose sees occupied hierarchical rank inferior to theirs, and were also immediately dependent on the patriarch; then 'simple', i.e. exempt bishops, neither archbishop nor suffragan; and lastly suffragan bishops, who depended on a (greater) metropolitan archbishopric.

It is not known by whom this very ancient order was established, but it is likely that, in the beginning, metropolitan sees and simple exempt bishoprics must have been classified according to the date of their respective foundations, this order being modified later on for political and religious considerations.

== Preserved documents ==
The principal documents (by church) are :

=== Patriarchate of Constantinople ===
- The Ecthesis of pseudo-Epiphanius, a 7th-century revision of an earlier Notitia Episcopatuum (that was created probably by Patriarch Epiphanius under Byzantine Emperor Justinian I), compiled and amended during the reign of Emperor Heraclius I (610-641) and his successors.
- a Notitia dating back to the first years of the ninth century and differing but little from the earlier one
- the Notitia of Basil the Armenian (867-886) drawn up between 820 and 842;
- the Notitia compiled by Leo VI the Wise (886-912), and Patriarch Nicholas Mysticus between 901 and 907, modifying the hierarchical order established in the seventh century and since disturbed by incorporation of the ecclesiastical provinces of Illyricum and Southern Italy in the Byzantine Patriarchate
- the Notitiae episcopatuum of Constantine Porphyrogenitus (about 940), of John I Tzimisces (about 980), of Alexius I Comnenus (about 1084), of Nilus Doxapatris (1143), of Manuel Comnenus (about 1170), of Isaac Angelus (end of twelfth century), of Michael VIII Palaeologus (about 1270), of Andronicus II Palaeologus (about 1299), and of Andronicus III Palaeologus (about 1330).

All these Notitiae are published in:

- Gustav Parthey, Hieroclis Synecdemus (Berlin, 1866).
- Heinrich Gelzer, Georgii Cyprii Descriptio orbis romani (Leipzig, 1890)
- Heinrich Gelzer, Index lectionum Ienae (Jena, 1892)
- Heinrich Gelzer, Ungedruckte und ungenügend veröffentlichte Texte der Notitiae episcopatuum (Munich, 1900)
- Jean Darrouzès, Notitiae Episcopatuum Ecclesiae Constantinopolitanae (Paris, 1981), being the newsiest and most comprehensive publication of all.

The later works are only more or less modified copies of the Notitia of Leo VI, and therefore do not present the true situation, which was profoundly changed by the Islamic invasions of the region. After the capture of Constantinople by the Turks in 1453, another Notitia was written, portraying the real situation (Gelzer, Ungedruckte Texte der Notitiae episcopatuum 613–37), and on it are based nearly all those that have been written since.

In more modern times, the term Syntagmation is now used in Greek language for these documents.

=== Patriarchate of Antioch ===
The only known Notitia episcopatuum for the Church of Antioch is that drawn up in the sixth century by Patriarch Anastasius I (561–571 and 593–599). Being a short list, it was published by Siméon Vailhé in 1907 in volume 64 of the Échos d'Orient journal.

=== Patriarchates of Jerusalem and Alexandria ===
The Patriarchate of Jerusalem has no such document, nor has that of Alexandria, although for the latter Gelzer in Byzantische Zeitschrift from 1893 has collected and published documents that may help remedy the deficiency.

Jacques de Rougé has published a Coptic document for the Patriarchate of Alexandria that has not yet been studied.

=== Bulgarian Patriarchate ===
The seats and heads of the Preslav and Dorostorum patriarchate from 927 to 1018 are listed in two official documents:

- the so called 'Du Cange's List' , named after Charles du Fresne, sieur du Cange who found and published the manuscripts in 1680;
- the Book of Boril;

In 1018 the Bulgarian patriarchate seated at Dorostorum was demoted by emperor Basil II (963-1023)to autocefalous archbishopric seated in Ohrid (Ahrida).

List of all seats at the time of demotion in 1018, presumably in hierarchical order, could be found in three sigillia by emperor Basil II (963-1023), dated from 1018 to 1020, as well as in the 'Du Cange's List' .

For the Preslav and Dorostorum patriarchate and its demotion, see the studies of Ioli Evangeliou. For the demoted Bulgarian Church with seat in Achrida, see Gelzer, Byzantische Zeitschrift, II, 40–66, and Der Patriarchat von Achrida (Leipzig, 1902).

=== Other churches ===
Other churches having Notitiae are Cypriot Orthodox Church, Serbian Orthodox Church, Russian Orthodox Church and Georgian Orthodox Church.

== Editions ==
- Parthey, Gustav, ed. (1866). Hieroclis Synecdemus et notitiae Graecae episcopatuum: Accedunt Nili Doxapatrii notitia patriarchatuum et locorum nomina immutata (in French, Latin, and Aramaic). Berolini: In aedibus Friderici Nicolai.
- Gelzer, Heinrich, ed. (1900). Ungedruckte und ungenügend veröffentlichte Texte der Notitiae episcopatuum. München: Akademie der Wissenschaften.
- Darrouzès, Jean, ed. (1981). Notitiae Episcopatuum Ecclesiae Constantinopolitanae (in French, Latin, and Ancient Greek). Paris: Institut français d'études byzantines.

== Bibliography ==
- Komatina, Predrag (2013). "Date of the Composition of the Notitiae Episcopatuum Ecclesiae Constantinopolitanae nos. 4, 5 and 6" (PDF). Зборник радова Византолошког института. 50 (1): 195–214.
- Ostrogorsky, George (1959). "Byzantine Cities in the Early Middle Ages". Dumbarton Oaks Papers. 13: 45–66. doi:10.2307/1291128. JSTOR 1291128.
