= Manfred Cuntz =

German astronomer

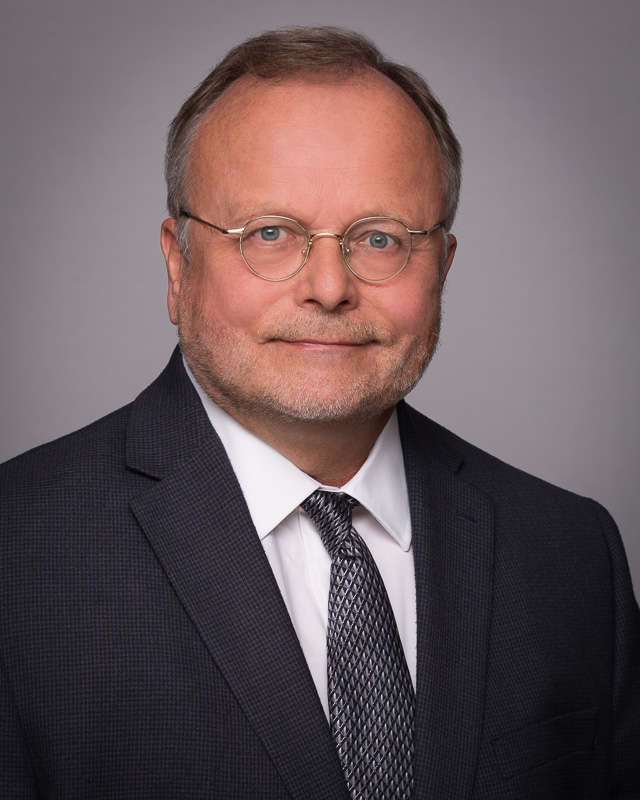
- Manfred Cuntz (2022)
- Born: April 21, 1958; Landau in der Pfalz, Rhineland-Palatinate, Germany
- Education: Eduard-Spranger Gymnasium
- Alma mater: University of Heidelberg (Diplom, PhD)
- Spouse: Anne-Gret Vera Friedrich
- Children: 1
- Awards: Academy of Distinguished Teachers at University of Texas at Arlington
- Scientific career
- Fields: Astrophysics; Astrobiology; Planetary habitability
- Workplaces: University of Colorado; High Altitude Observatory; University of Heidelberg; University of Alabama in Huntsville; University of Texas at Arlington
- Thesis: Generation of Extended Chromospheres and Mass Loss of Late-Type Giant Stars due to Acoustic Shock Waves (1988)
- Doctoral advisor: Dr. P. Ulmschneider

Manfred Cuntz is a German-American astrophysicist and a Professor Emeritus at the University of Texas at Arlington (UTA). His primary research interests include stellar astrophysics, astrobiology, and planetary habitability. Formerly, he was also awarded the title of Distinguished Teaching Professor. In 2023, he became a fellow with the Committee for Skeptical Inquiry.

== Early life and education ==
Manfred Cuntz was born on April 21, 1958, in Landau in der Pfalz in Rhineland-Palatinate, Germany. He was the first-born son of Gerhard Hermann Cuntz and Irene Emma Cuntz (née Messerschmitt) and was raised in Bornheim. His family's business was in viticulture and livestock agriculture. As the eldest son, Cuntz would have inherited the farm. Early on, however, his family deemed him unsuitable for farm work and, instead, had him focus on his education.

Cuntz attended secondary school at the Eduard-Spranger Gymnasium in Landau, from which he graduated with the Abitur. Even though he was a dedicated student, especially in mathematics and the natural sciences, academic success did not come easily to Cuntz in all subjects. In fact, he had to repeat the eighth grade. After that, however, he became a top student, especially in the last years of secondary school when he was able to focus on the subjects of mathematics, chemistry, and social studies.

Cuntz went on to study physics and astronomy at the University of Heidelberg, Germany. There, he earned a Diplom (equivalent to having earned both a U.S. bachelor's and master's degrees) in Physics in 1985. He earned his PhD (Dr. rer. nat.) in Astronomy from the same university in 1988 with a dissertation on stellar atmospheric heating and stellar winds, titled Generation of Extended Chromospheres and Mass Loss of Late-Type Giant Stars due to Acoustic Shock Waves.

== Career ==
After completing his degrees at the University of Heidelberg, Manfred Cuntz moved to the United States. He held positions as a postdoctoral research assistant in the Joint Institute for Laboratory Astrophysics (JILA) at the University of Colorado from 1989 to 1991 and at the High Altitude Observatory (HAO) from 1992 to 1993, a division of the National Center for Atmospheric Research (NCAR). In 1994, he returned to the University of Heidelberg as Habilitation Fellow. Then, he joined the Center for Space Plasma and Aeronomic Research at the University of Alabama in Huntsville from 1996 until 1999, which also involved collaborations with NASA's Marshall Space Flight Center. In 2000, Cuntz became a visiting professor in the physics department of the University of Texas at Arlington, then moved up the tenure track to become Professor in 2012.

He is an editor of the journal Astronomische Nachrichten (Astronomical Notes).

== Research ==
In his early research Cuntz expanded on his Ph.D. work while pursuing hydrodynamic simulations of stellar atmospheres and winds. He also considered observational data obtained by the International Ultraviolet Explorer and the Hubble Space Telescope. Cuntz's subsequent and more recent research focuses on the probability and possible distribution of extraterrestrial life on extrasolar planets and moons and "is based on a pure theoretical approach."

In 2000, Manfred Cuntz, together with Zdzislaw Musielak (UTA) and Steven Saar of the Harvard-Smithsonian Center for Astrophysics, predicted "that planetary magnetic fields could produce detectable effects on stars". This phenomenon was later observed in 2003 by E. Shkolnik of the University of British Columbia, Canada. The underlying effect also allows to quantify magnetic fields in certain exoplanets. Cuntz also argued that "extreme magnetic protection by a powerful planetary magnetic dipole field" could increase the probability that a planet is habitable even if it is subject to "extreme ultraviolet and x-ray" radiation from its star.

In 2007, together with colleagues from the Potsdam Institute for Climate Impact Research (PIK), he contemporaneously came to the same conclusion as the group of F. Selsis (ENS Lyon), namely that the proposed exoplanet Gliese 581d, a super-Earth, is the first planet identified to be situated in a habitable zone outside the Solar System. Since about 2014, based on new data, the existence of Gliese 581d has been disputed; however, the discussion on this is not yet complete.

In 2010, in collaboration with his then-graduate student Jason Eberle, Cuntz explored the reality of a planet in the Nu Octantis system, which apparently is situated in a retrograde orbit. The existence of this planet was first suggested by the team of David Ramm at the University of Canterbury, New Zealand. Cuntz noted that "[Our studies] provide evidence for the first case of a planet in a retrograde orbit in a stellar binary system". Rudolf Dvorak, a professor at the University of Vienna, pointed out that "[t]he results of Eberle and Cuntz are important for the big hot topic of astronomy, namely extrasolar planets, and especially interesting for the dynamics of planets in double stars [noting that] in the solar neighborhood more than 60 percent of the stars are not single." In 2025, additional evidence in support of this planet was obtained by Ho Wan Cheng, University of Hong Kong, and colleagues.

In 2012, Manfred Cuntz and Billy Quarles, as part of a team of researchers from the University of Texas Arlington, "gained international recognition for identifying the possibility of a habitable moon within the orbit of the recently discovered planet called Kepler-16b." The scientists used data from NASA's Kepler space telescope to analyze the possibilities of an Earth-like planet or moon to sustain life within the Kepler binary star system. They relied on Cuntz's expertise in astrobiology "to develop a range within the system where life would be able to exist." According to Cuntz, "the planet's critical feature to sustain life would be liquid water"; and he speculated that under suitable conditions those "life form[s] could be along the lines of [...] plant[s] or bacteria."

Cuntz and Quarles collaborated again as co-authors on a study led by Oshina Jagtap published in 2021, which "explores the possibility of exomoons in a planetary system named HD 23079, located in Reticulum, a small constellation in the southern sky." This system is of interest because it contains a planet similar to Jupiter. Cuntz argues that since "Jupiter [is] a host to four planet-size moons (among many other moons), with two of them (Europa and Ganymede) having a significant chance of being habitable," gas giants in other star systems which could host an Earth-sized moon with the conditions for liquid water. Other work also focused on the principal possibility of submoons and on exocomets.

To aid astrophysicists in identifying habitable zones, Cuntz with the assistance of R. Bruntz and Zhaopeng Wang developed "BinHab, a new online tool that can be used to calculate the regions of binary systems favorable for life" in 2014. According to Cuntz, the program considers both "the amounts of stellar radiation, which provides a favorable planetary climate for life, and the gravitational influence of both stars on an existing planet." The interim dean of the UTA College of Science, James Grover, said this tool "holds enormous potential for those who study space in the search for life."

In 2016, Cuntz, while collaborating with Edward Guinan at Villanova University, explored which types of stars are best suited to offer prospects of habitability. They argued in favor of orange dwarfs, namely low-luminosity G-type and K-type stars; the related planetary condition is sometimes also called superhabitability. Guinan pointed out that "[m]any K-stars can be much older than our Sun. So, if life formed and evolved on habitable zone planet hosted by a[n] old K-star ... a few to several billions of years older than the Sun; it could maybe even harbor intelligent life."

In 2022, while collaborating with four of his students, Cuntz published a catalog of planet-hosting triple star systems, a relatively rare astronomical phenomenon.

Cuntz also worked with other researchers to "examine[d] both the damaging and the favourable effects of ultraviolet (UV) radiation from stars on DNA molecules" and how it could affect "potential carbon-based extraterrestrial life forms in the habitable zones around other stars." A study conducted by Cuntz, Satoko Sato, and researchers from the University of Guanajuato in Mexico found that F-type star systems "may [...] be a good place to look for habitable planets" because they have a larger "area where conditions are right for general Earth-type planets to develop and sustain life" than smaller, cooler stars like the Sun. The research demonstrated that the damage to DNA (used as a proxy for general biomolecules) from UV radiation on planets "in the outer portions of F-star habitable zones" was "similar to the damage on Earth, if Earth did not have an atmosphere."

In 2024, Cuntz revisited the topic of habitability for F-star systems in collaboration with then-PhD student Shaan Patel, and Nevin Weinberg, a UTA faculty, based on data from the NASA exoplanet archive. They identified numerous planets situated in stellar habitable zones, at least part-time. In one case, that is 38 Virginis, the planet is always located in the star’s habitable zone, making this system the best case known to date in the search of life.

Subsequently, Cuntz and team also explored the reality of moons in M-dwarf systems. They found that habitable zone exomoons are highly unlikely in most of those systems due to orbital instabilities initiated by tides, thus significantly limiting the number of potentially habitable objects in our galaxy and the universe at large. Evidently, this finding has noticeable implications for possible solutions to the Drake equation, including the Fermi paradox. This result also affects our perception of planet K2-18b by further weakening the previously suggested biological interpretation.

== Community involvement ==
Cuntz actively participates in education and public outreach (EPO). He has worked with The Planetarium at University of Texas at Arlington to create several shows. A 45-minute film titled Magnificent Sun, for which Cuntz co-authored the script, is intended to allow "the general public to share information and excitement about solar physics." Another show, Cosmic CSI: Looking for Life in the Universe, aims to present Cuntz's "research in astrobiology to the rest of the community." Additionally, he was the Principal Investigator for the development of a 3-D planetarium film "based on NASA's research and outreach mission, Stratospheric Observatory for Infrared Astronomy, or SOFIA."

Outside of his academic work, Cuntz pursues examination of fake news in science by writing articles in the journal Skeptical Inquirer. This has included articles about misguided criticism of the work of Albert Einstein and commentary about responses from religious groups regarding the James Webb Space Telescope (JWST).

== Literary influences ==
A publication by Cuntz on possible Earth-like planets in the star system 55 Cancri served as inspiration for Kenneth E. Ingle's science fiction novel First Contact: Escape to 55 Cancri.

Cuntz also chose to explore urban legends. He provided contributions to Rolf Wilhelm Brednich, at that time a professor of Folklore / European ethnology at the University of Göttingen in Germany, for one of his books.

In 2024, Cuntz published his first children's book, titled Fun with Three Suns in the Sky, aimed at sparking interest in young children in astronomy and space science. The storyline of the book is loosely modeled after the Alpha Centauri system.

== Publications ==
=== Books ===
- Practical Universe: Observations, Experiments, Exercises (mit N. Veerabathina, L. Gurdemir, J. Davis), Dubuque, Iowa, USA: Kendall Hunt Publishing Company, 2016, ISBN 978-1-5249-2331-0
- Fun with Three Suns in the Sky, Kendall Hunt Publishing Company, 2024, ISBN 979-8765798157

=== Selected articles ===
- Tidally Torn: Why the Most Common Stars May Lack Large, Habitable-zone Moons (2026) (incl. S. D. Patel, B. Quarles, N. N. Weinberg).
- Can Moons Exist around the Habitable-zone Planet K2-18b? (2025) (incl. S. D. Patel, B. Quarles, N. N. Weinberg).
- Statistics and Habitability of F-type Star–Planet Systems (2024) (incl. S. D. Patel, N. N. Weinberg).
- The Once-canceled Habitable-zone Super-Earth Gliese 581d Might Indeed Exist! (2024) (incl. S. G. Engle, E. F. Guinan).
- X-ray Activity Variations and Coronal Abundances of the Star-Planet Interaction Candidate HD 179949 (2023) (incl. A. Acharya, V. L. Kashyap, S. H. Saar, K. P. Singh).
- An Early Catalog of Planet-Hosting Multiple-Star Systems of Order Three and Higher (2022) (incl. G. E. Luke, M. J. Millard, L. Boyle, S. D. Patel).
- Updated Studies on Exomoons in the HD 23079 System (2021) (incl. O. Jagtap, B. Quarles).
- Orbital Stability of Exomoons and Submoons with Applications to Kepler 1625b-I (2020) (incl. M. Rosario-Franco, B. Quarles, Z. E. Musielak).
- Can Planets Exist in the Habitable Zone of 55 Cancri? (2019) (incl. S. Satyal).
- Exocomets in the 47 UMa System: Theoretical Simulations Including Water Transport (2018) (incl. B. Loibnegger, R. Dvorak).
- Case Studies of Exocomets in the System of HD 10180 (2017) (incl. B. Loibnegger, R. Dvorak).
- About Exobiology: The Case for Dwarf K Stars (2016) (incl. E. F. Guinan).
- Fractal and Multifractal Analysis of the Rise of Oxygen in Earth's Early Atmosphere (2015) (incl. S. Kumar, Z. E. Musielak).
- Habitability of Earth-mass Planets and Moons in the Kepler-16 System (2012) (incl. B. Quarles, Z. E. Musielak).
- The Advection of Supergranules by the Sun's Axisymmetric Flows (2010) (incl. D. H. Hathaway, P. E. Williams, K. Dela Rosa).
- On the Reality of the Suggested Planet in the Nu Octantis System (2010) (incl. J. Eberle).
- The Great Oxidation of Earth's Atmosphere: Contesting the Yoyo Model via Transition Stability Analysis (2009) (incl. D. Roy, Z. E. Musielak).
- A Method for the Treatment of Supergranulation Advection by Giant Cells (2009) (incl. P. E. Williams).
- Acoustic Heating of the Solar Chromosphere: Present Indeed and Locally Dominant (2007) (incl. W. Rammacher, Z. E. Musielak).
- A New Version of Reimers' Law of Mass Loss Based on a Physical Approach (2005) (incl. K.-P. Schröder).
- On the Possibility of Earth-type Habitable Planets in the 55 Cancri System (2003) (incl. W. von Bloh, C. Bounama, S. Franck).
- Orbital Stability of Terrestrial Planets inside the Habitable Zones of Extrasolar Planetary Systems (2002) (incl. M. Noble, Z. E. Musielak).
- On Stellar Activity Enhancement Due to Interactions with Extrasolar Giant Planets (2000) (incl. S. H. Saar, Z. E. Musielak).
- A Generalized Version of the Rankine-Hugoniot Relations Including Ionization, Dissociation and Related Phenomena (1993) (incl. H. Nieuwenhuijzen, C. de Jager, A. Lobel, L. Achmad).
