= Kuntz (disambiguation) =

Kuntz is a German surname.

Kuntz may also refer to:

- Kuntz Electroplating Incorporated, a surface finishing company
- Kuntz, former name of Mad River, California within Trinity County
- Kuntz Stadium, an outdoor soccer facility located in Indianapolis
- Marlene Kuntz, a rock band from Cuneo, Italy
- "Kuntz," a song on the Butthole Surfers' 1987 album Locust Abortion Technician
