= Johann Heinrich Gelzer =

Swiss historian and diplomat

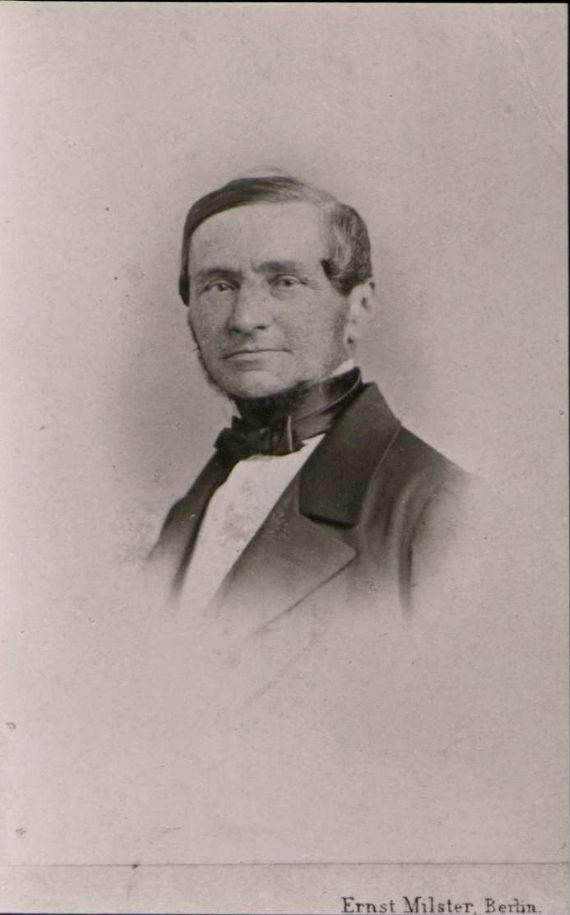
- Born: 17 October 1813
- Died: 15 August 1889

Johann Heinrich Gelzer (17 October 1813 – 15 August 1889) was a Swiss historian and diplomat who was a native of Schaffhausen. He was the father of philologist Heinrich Gelzer (1847–1906).

He studied history and theology at the Universities of Zurich, Jena, Halle and Berlin, earning his doctorate in 1836 at Jena. In 1839 he received his habilitation at Basel, where he was a lecturer of literary history.

From 1844 to 1851, he held the chair of history at Humboldt University in Berlin, and in the meantime, served as an adviser to Frederick William IV of Prussia. In 1851 he returned to Basel, where he edited the Protestantischen Monatsblätter für innere Zeitgeschichte. In 1856–1857 he worked as a mediator between Prussia and Switzerland in regards to the Neuenburger Handel (Neuchâtel affair). Later on, he became an adviser to Frederick I, Grand Duke of Baden.

In 1886 Gelzer was awarded an honorary professorship from the University of Jena. One of his better written efforts was the two-volume Die letzten drei der Jahrhunderte Schweizergeschichte (The Last Three Centuries of Swiss History).
