= Kuntz Electroplating =

Canadian surface finishing company

Kuntz Electroplating Incorporated

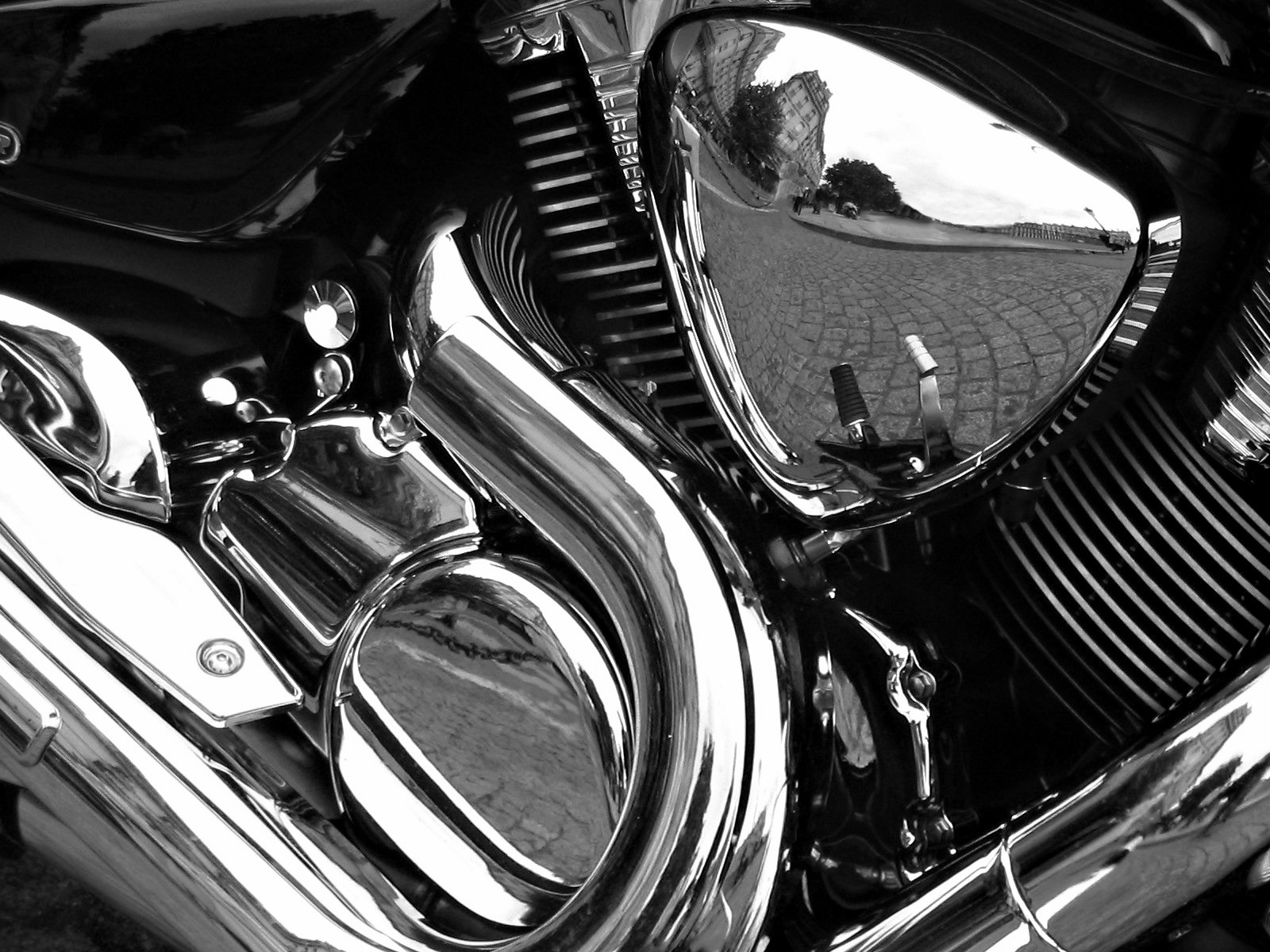
- Chrome Plating
- Company type: Private company
- Industry: Manufacturing
- Predecessor: Kuntz Brewery
- Founded: October 16, 1948; 77 years ago
- Founder: Oscar Kuntz
- Headquarters: Kitchener, Ontario, Canada
- Area served: United States, Canada, France, Germany, Italy, and others
- Key people: Paul Kuntz, Robert Kuntz Sr. (CEO)
- Products: Surface Finishing
- Owner: Family owned
- Number of employees: 290 (2023)
- Website: kuntz.com

Kuntz Electroplating Incorporated is a Canadian surface finishing company specializing in Chrome plating. It is North America's largest polishing and plating company for original equipment manufacturers of steel, aluminum and zinc components for the automotive, motorcycle, appliance and specialty equipment industries.

The company is one of the oldest and largest companies in Waterloo Region. Kuntz was a division of Magna International for 12 years between 1978 and 1990. The company has since been owned by the sons of Oscar, Bobby Kuntz and Paul Kuntz.

== History ==
=== Foundation ===
The Kuntz Brewery was sued in 1929 for bootlegging to the United States for $200,000. The Brewery had to be sold and the leftover money was passed down to Oscar Kuntz where, 18 years later, he started building a new company for plating metal.

=== Early years 1947-1970 ===
In 1947 Oscar Kuntz purchased a building owned by Carr Brothers on Princess Street in Waterloo. At that time named Metal Finishers.

- 1951, company moved to the larger Nyberg Street location. 6,000 square feet 50 employees.
- 1956, expansion to 12,000 square feet (1,100 m^{2}).
- 1965, moved to current location on Wilson Ave. 19,000 square feet (1,800 m^{2}).
- 1968, anniversary added 11,000 square feet (1,000 m^{2}) the "old Hoist Line" and a new Polishing building, 100 employees.

=== Ownership change and expansion 1970-1989 ===
- 1973, new maintenance division, chemical lab, quality control center, automotive lines and shipping department, 150 employees and 52,000 square feet (4,800 m^{2}).
- 1978, joined Magna International added 23,000 square feet (2,100 m^{2}).
- 1985, added 7,500 square feet (700 m^{2}) for waste treatment plant.
- 1988, expanded to 425 employees for 40th anniversary.
- 1989, acquired "Formulated Coatings of Brampton." added 90 employees and a 120,000-square-foot (11,000 m^{2}) facility.

=== Revert ownership and growth 1990-2004 ===
- 1990, separated from Magna International to pursue own interests.
- 1993-1996, large growth allowed the acquisition of 300 new employees for a total of 675.
- 1997, wheel plating expanded (now the largest sector) hired 150 new employees.
- 1999, adopted environmentally friendly practices, built steam generator giving 50% of total power.
- 2000, expanded plating line, adopted a new robotics program to raise production and added a new water treatment facility.
- 2001, The company reached its peak with 1,200 employees and a 750,000-square-foot (70,000 m^{2}) complex.
- 2004, partnered with Harley-Davidson bring total production up to 3,000,000 parts per year.

=== Downturn and revival 2008-Present ===
- 2008, company downsizes to endure global recession. It was one of the few manufacturers to survive in Waterloo Region.
- 2010, recalled a portion of the laid off workers bringing total back to 850 employees.

== Major Clients ==
Major clients include General Motors, Ford, Harley-Davidson, Toyota, BMW, Audi, Honda, Jaguar Cars, Bentley, Volvo, Mercedes-Benz, Freightliner Trucks.
