= Otto Cuntz =

German-Austrian classical historian

Otto Cuntz (10 September 1865, Stettin – 1 December 1932, Graz) was a German-Austrian classical historian, who specialized in ancient geography and topography.

He studied at the universities of Zurich, Strasbourg and Bonn, where his instructors were Heinrich Nissen, Franz Bücheler and Hermann Usener. After graduation in 1888, he continued his education in Berlin as a student of Otto Hirschfeld and Reinhard Kekulé von Stradonitz. In 1892 he took an extended study trip to Italy, Greece, Spain and France, then in 1894 obtained his habilitation at the University of Strasbourg. In 1898 he became an associate professor, and six years later was appointed a full professor of Roman history at the University of Graz. In 1920 he became a corresponding member of the Austrian Academy of Sciences.

== Published works ==
- De Augusto Plinii Geographicorum auctore. Bonn 1888 (dissertation).
- "Agrippa und Augustus als Quellenschriftsteller des Plinius in den geographischen Büchern der Naturalis historia". In: Jahrbücher für classische Philologie. 17. Supplementband (1890), S. 473–527 – Agrippa and Augustus as sources for Pliny in the geographical books of Naturalis Historia.
- "Beiträge zur Textkritik des Itinerarium Antonini". In: Wiener Studien. Band 15 (1893), S. 260–298 – Contribution to the textual criticism of the Antonine Itinerary.
- Patrum Nicaenorum nomina Latine Graece Coptice Syriace Arabice Armeniace, 1898 (edited with Heinrich Gelzer and Heinrich Hilgenfeld).
- Polybius und sein Werk, 1902 – Polybius and his works.
- Die Geographie des Ptolemaeus, Galliae, Germania, Raetia, Noricum, Pannoniae, Illyricum, Italia. Handschriften, Text und Untersuchung, 1923 – The geography of Ptolemy, Gaul, Germania, Rhaetia, Noricum, Pannonia, Illyricum, Italy. Handwritings, text and investigations.
