= Ancient Egyptian units of measurement =

System of measurement used in Ancient Egypt

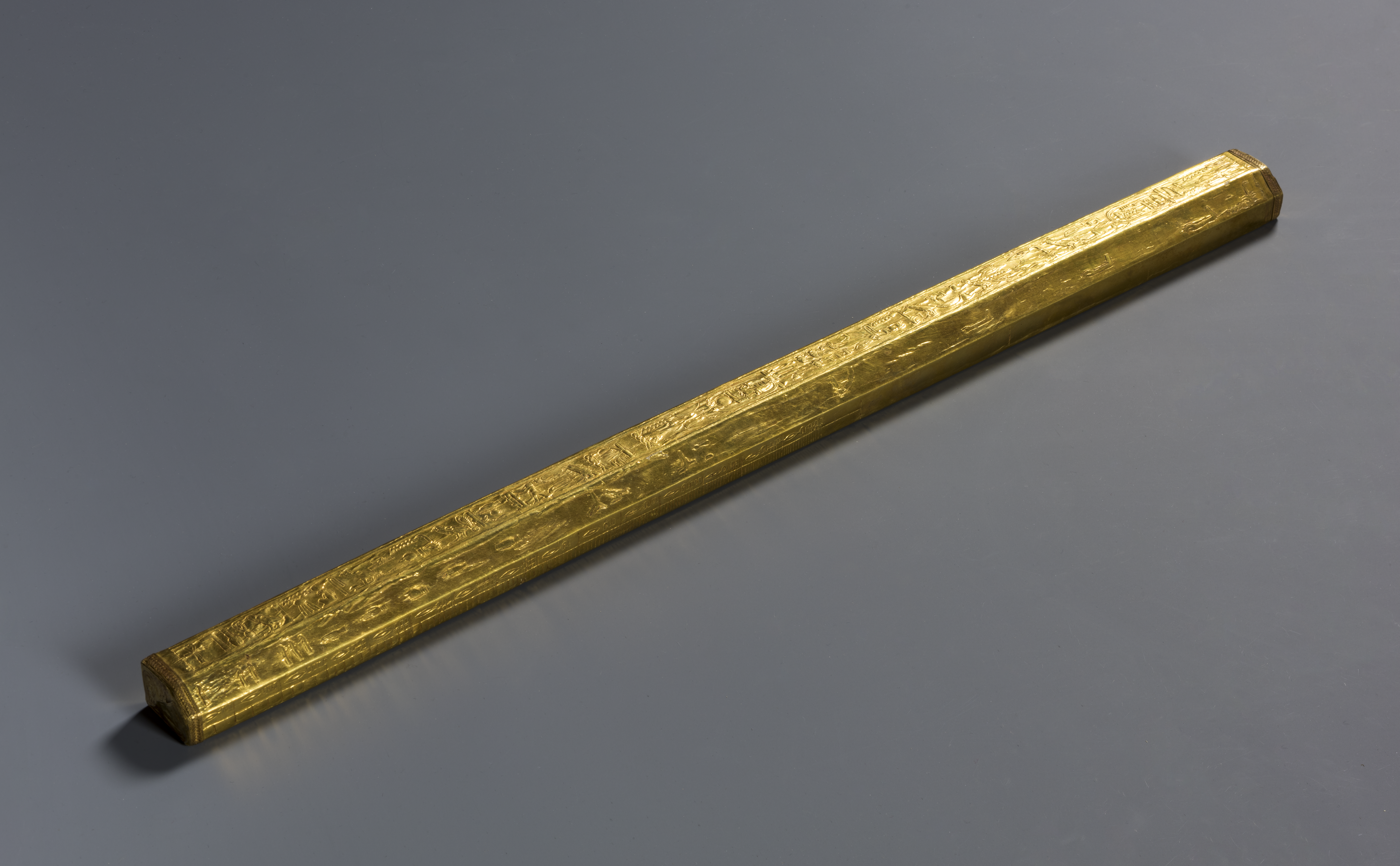
Royal cubit rod inscribed with the name of King Amenhotep II, gilded wood, New Kingdom, 18th Dynasty, 1427–1401 BC, from the Tomb of Kha and Merit (TT8). Museo Egizio, Turin (S. 8647).

The ancient Egyptian units of measurement are those used by the dynasties of ancient Egypt prior to its incorporation in the Roman Empire and general adoption of Roman, Greek, and Byzantine units of measurement. The units of length seem to have originally been anthropic, based on various parts of the human body, although these were standardized using cubit rods, strands of rope, and official measures maintained at some temples.

Following Alexander the Great's conquest of Persia and subsequent death, his bodyguard and successor Ptolemy assumed control in Egypt, partially reforming its measurements, introducing some new units and hellenized names for others.

== Length ==
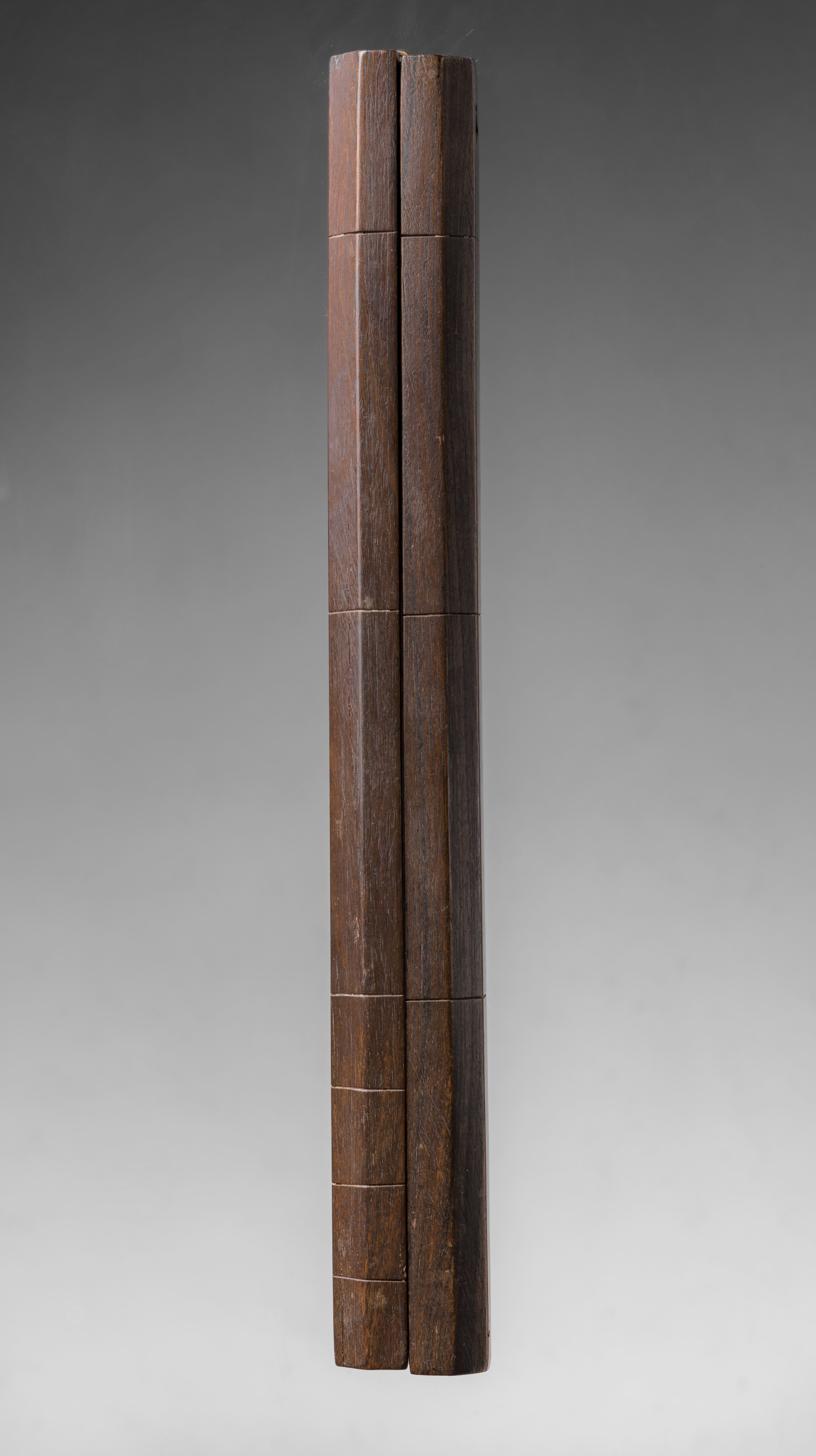
Folding cubit rod, New Kingdom, 18th Dynasty, 1425–1353 BC, from the Tomb of Kha and Merit (TT8), Deir el-Medina. Museo Egizio, Turin (S. 8391).

Egyptian units of length are attested from the Early Dynastic Period. Although it dates to the 5th dynasty, the Palermo stone recorded the level of the Nile River during the reign of the Early Dynastic pharaoh Djer, when the height of the Nile was recorded as 6 cubits and 1 palm (about 3.217 m or 10 ft 6.7 in). A Third Dynasty diagram shows how to construct an elliptical vault using simple measures along an arc. The ostracon depicting this diagram was found near the Step Pyramid of Saqqara. A curve is divided into five sections and the height of the curve is given in cubits, palms, and digits in each of the sections.

At some point, lengths were standardized by cubit rods. Examples have been found in the tombs of officials, noting lengths up to remen. Royal cubits were used for land measures such as roads and fields. Fourteen rods, including one double-cubit rod, were described and compared by Lepsius. Two examples are known from the Saqqara tomb of Maya, the treasurer of Tutankhamun. Another was found in the tomb of Kha (TT8) in Thebes. These cubits are about 52.5 cm (20.7 in) long and are divided into palms and hands: each palm is divided into four fingers from left to right and the fingers are further subdivided into ro from right to left. The rulers are also divided into hands so that for example one foot is given as three hands and fifteen fingers and also as four palms and sixteen fingers.

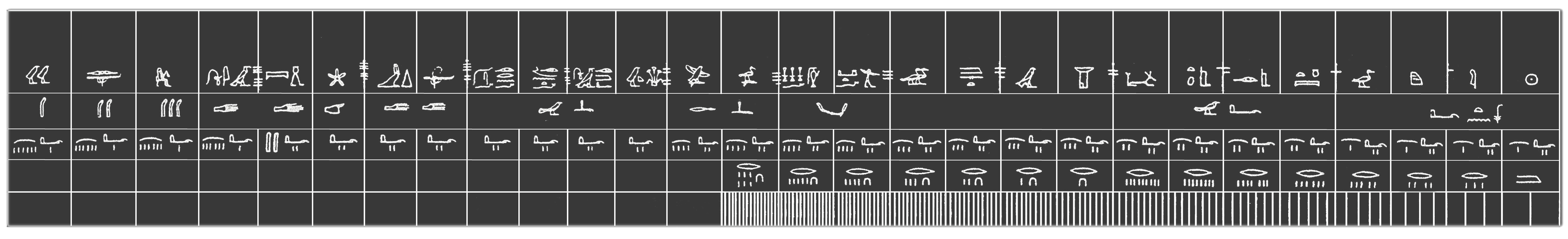
Cubit rod from the Turin Museum.

Surveying and itinerant measurement were undertaken using rods, poles, and knotted cords of rope. A scene in the tomb of Menna in Thebes shows surveyors measuring a plot of land using rope with knots tied at regular intervals. Similar scenes can be found in the tombs of Amenhotep-Sesi, Khaemhat and Djeserkareseneb. The balls of rope are also shown in New Kingdom statues of officials such as Senenmut, Amenemhet-Surer, and Penanhor.

Units of Length
| Names | | | | | Equivalents | | |
| English | Egyptian | | Coptic | | Palms | Digits | Metric (Note: Gardiner, §266, pp. 199–200.) |
|---|---|---|---|---|---|---|---|
| Digit; Finger; Fingerbreadth; Tebā | D50 (Note: Alternative representations for the Egyptian digit include D50 Z1 and I10 D58 D36 D50.) | ḏbꜥ | ⲧⲏⲏⲃⲉ | tēēbe | 1/4 | 1 | 1.875 cm |
| Palm; Hand; Shesep | D48 (Note: Alternative representations for the Egyptian palm include D46, N11, O42 and O42 Q3 N11.) | šsp | ϣⲟⲡ ϣⲟⲟⲡ ϣⲱⲡ ϣⲁⲡ | shop shoop shōp shap | 1 | 4 | 7.5 cm |
| Hand; Handsbreadth | D46 (Note: Alternative representations for the Egyptian hand include D46 X1 F51, D46 X1 Z1, and U28 X1 D47.) | ḏrt | ϩⲱϩϥ | hōhf | 1 1/4 | 5 | 9.38 cm |
| Fist | D49 (Note: Alternative representations for the Egyptian fist include Aa1 I9 D36 D49 and Aa1 I9 D36 D49 Z1 as ḫfꜥ and G1 G17 G17 D49, G1 G17 G17 X1 D49, and M17 G17 D49 as ꜣmm.) | ḫfꜥ ꜣmm | ϭⲁϫⲙⲏ ϫⲁⲙⲏ | qajmē jamē | 1 1/2 | 6 | 11.25 cm |
| Double Handbreadth | D48 D48 (Note: Alternative representations for the Egyptian double handbreadth include D48 D48.) | šspwy | | | 2 | 8 | 15 cm |
| Small Span; Pedj-Sheser; Shat Nedjes; Little Shat | H7 G37 | pḏ šsr šꜣt nḏs | ⲣⲧⲱ ⲉⲣⲧⲱ | rtō ertō | 3 | 12 | 22.5 cm |
| Great Span; Half-Cubit; Pedj-Aa; Shat Aa; Great Shat | H7 O29 (Note: Alternative representations for the Egyptian half-cubit include of uncertain pronunciation.) | pḏ ꜥꜣ šꜣt ꜥꜣ | ⲣⲧⲱ ⲉⲣⲧⲱ | rtō ertō | 3 1/2 | 14 | 26 cm |
| Foot; Djeser; Ser; Bent Arm | D45 | ḏsr | | | 4 | 16 | 30 cm |
| Shoulder; Remen; Upper Arm | D41 | rmn | | | 5 | 20 | 37.5 cm |
| Small Cubit; Short Cubit; Meh Nedjes | D42 G37 | mḥ nḏs mḥ šsr | ⲙⲁϩⲉ ⲙⲉϩⲓ | mahe mehi | 6 | 24 | 45 cm |
| Cubit; Royal Cubit; Sacred Cubit; Meh Nesut; Meh Nisut; Mahi; Ell | D42 (Note: Alternative representations of the Egyptian cubit or royal cubit include D36, D36 Y1, D36 Z1, V22 D36, V22 D42, V22 Z1 D36, all pronounced mḥ, and the explicit "royal" or "sacred cubit" M23 t n D42, pronounced mḥ nswt or ni͗-swt.) | mḥ | ⲙⲁϩⲉ ⲙⲉϩⲓ | mahe mehi | 7 | 28 | 52.3 cm 52.5 cm |
| Pole; Nebiu | N35 D58 M17 V1 T19 | nbiw | | | 8 | 32 | 60 cm |
| Rod; Rod of Cord; Stick of Rope; Khet; Schoinion | W24 G43 V28 (Note: Alternative representations of the Egyptian rod include M3 and M3 X1 Z1 N35 N35 U19 W24 G43 V28 V1, M3 X1 Z1 N35 N35 U19 W24 V28 V1, and M3 X1 Z1 N35 U19 W24 V28, which were pronounced ḫt n nwḥ (Coptic: ϣⲉ ⲛ ⲛⲟϩ, she n noh).) | ḫt | ϩⲱⲧⲉ ϩⲱϯ | hōte hōti | 100 cubits | | 52.5 m |
| Schoenus; River-Measure; League; Ater; Iter or Iteru | M17 X1 D21 G43 N35B N36 N21 Z1 (Note: Alternative representations of the Egyptian schoenus include M17 X1 D21 G43 D54, M17 X1 D21 G43 D54 Z1, M17 X1 D21 G43 N36, M17 X1 D21 N35A D54 N21 Z1, M17 X1 Z7 D21 N35A D54, M17 X1 Z7 D21 N35A N17 N21 N21 Z2, M17 X1 Z7 D21 N35A N36 N21 Z1 Z2, M17 X1 Z7 D21 N35A N36 N23, M17 X1 D21 Z7 N37 Z2, and M17 D21 D56 D54.) | jtrw | ϣϥⲱ ϣⲃⲱ | shfō shvō | 20,000 cubits | | 10.5 km |

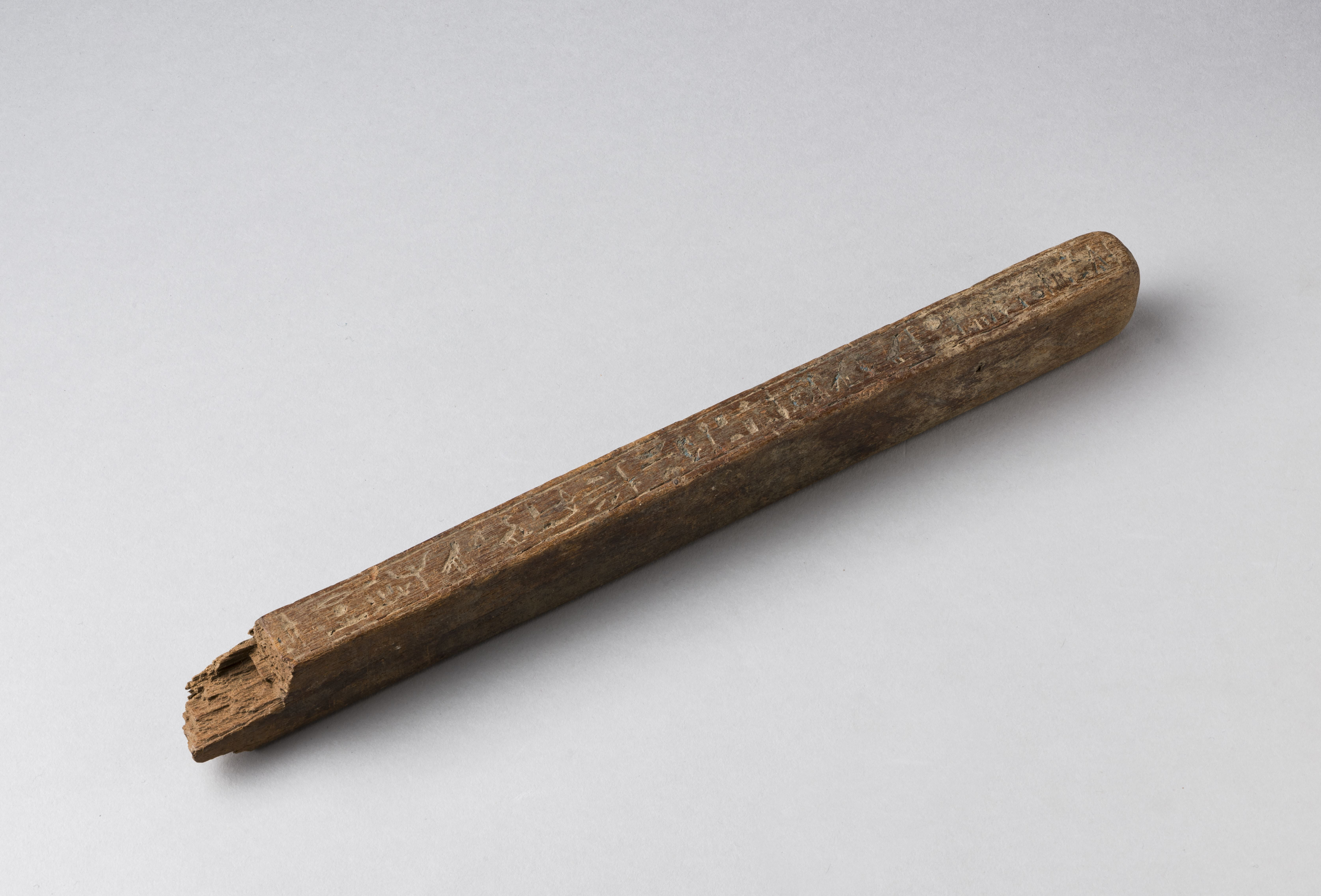
Fragment of measuring rod (cubit), wood, New Kingdom, 18th Dynasty, 1550–1292 BC, from Deir el-Medina. Museo Egizio, Turin (S. 7532).

The digit was also subdivided into smaller fractions of 1/2, 1/3, 1/4, and 1/16. Minor units include the Middle Kingdom reed of 2 royal cubits, (Note: The Egyptian reed was written N35 D58 M17 M3 or N35 D58 M17 Z7 T19 and pronounced nbi͗.) the Ptolemaic xylon (Ancient Greek: ξύλον, lit. "timber") of three royal cubits, the Ptolemaic fathom (Ancient Greek: ὀργυιά, orgyiá; Ancient Egyptian: ḥpt; Coptic: ϩⲡⲟⲧ, hpot) of four lesser cubits, and the kalamos of six royal cubits.

== Area ==
Records of land area also date to the Early Dynastic Period. The Palermo Stone records grants of land expressed in terms of kha and setat. Mathematical papyri also include units of land area in their problems. For example, several problems in the Moscow Mathematical Papyrus give the area of rectangular plots of land in terms of setat and the ratio of the sides and then require the scribe to solve for their exact lengths.

The setat was the basic unit of land measure and may originally have varied in size across Egypt's nomes. Later, it was equal to one square khet, where a khet measured 100 cubits. The setat could be divided into strips one khet long and ten cubit wide (a kha).

During the Old Kingdom:

Units of Area
| Names | | | | | Equivalents | | |
| English | Egyptian | | Coptic | | Setat | Square Cubits | Metric |
|---|---|---|---|---|---|---|---|
| Sa; Eighth | G39 | zꜣ | | | 1/800 | 12 1/2 | 3.4456 m^{2} |
| Heseb; Fourth; Account Unit | Z9 | ḥsb | | | 1/400 | 25 | 6.8913 m^{2} |
| Remen; Half; Shoulder | D41 | rmn | | | 1/200 | 50 | 13.783 m^{2} |
| Ta; Khet; Cubit; Cubit of Land; Land Cubit; Ground Cubit; Cubit Strip; Land Unit | N17 (Note: Alternative representations of the 100-square-cubit measure include D41 and D41 N16, both pronounced mḥ tꜣ, and V28 G1 X1 N37 M12.) | tꜣ ḫt mḥ mḥ itn | ϫⲓⲥⲉ | jise | 1/100 | 100 | 27.565 m^{2} |
| Kha; Thousand | M12 | ḫꜣ | | | 1/10 | 1,000 | 275.65 m^{2} |
| Setat; Setjat; Aroura; Square Khet | s t F29 t Z4 (Note: Alternative representations of the setat include N18, O39 Z1, S22 X1 X1, S29 V13 V2 X1 O39, V2 X1 N23, V2 X1 X1 N23 Z1, V2 X1 X1 O39, V2 X1 Z4, V2 X1 Z4 N23 Z1 Z1, and D35 X1 Z4 V20 Z2, all pronounced sṯꜣt.) | sṯꜣ sṯꜣt | ⲥⲱⲧ ⲥⲧⲉⲓⲱϩⲉ | sōt steiōhe | 1 | 10,000 | 2,756.5 m^{2} |

During the Middle and New Kingdom, the "eighth", "fourth", "half", and "thousand" units were taken to refer to the setat rather than the cubit strip:

| Sa; Eighth | G39 (Note: Alternative representations of the 1/8 setat include.) | sꜣ | | | 1/8 | 1,250 | 345 m^{2} |
| Heseb; Fourth | Z9 (Note: Alternative representations of the quarter-setat include Aa2 Y1.) | ḥsb r-fdw | | | 1/4 | 2,500 | 689 m^{2} |
| Gs; Remen; Half | Aa13 (Note: Alternative representations of the half-setat include W11 S29 Aa13, pronounced gs, D41, pronounced rmn, and Y5 N35 M40.) | gs | ⲣⲉⲣⲙⲏ | rermē | 1/2 | 5,000 | 1378 m^{2} |
| Kha; Thousand | M12 (Note: Alternative representations of the thousand-ta measure include M12 N16 N23 Z1, M12 N17, and M12 Z1 N35 N16 N23 Z1.) | ḫꜣ ḫꜣ tꜣ | | | 10 | 100,000 | 2.76 ha |

During the Ptolemaic period, the cubit strip square was surveyed using a length of 96 cubits rather than 100, although the aroura was still figured to compose 2,756.25 m^{2}. A 36 square cubit area was known as a kalamos and a 144 square cubit area as a hamma. The uncommon bikos may have been 1 1/2 hammata or another name for the cubit strip. The Coptic shipa (ϣⲓⲡⲁ) was a land unit of uncertain value, possibly derived from Nubia.

== Volume ==
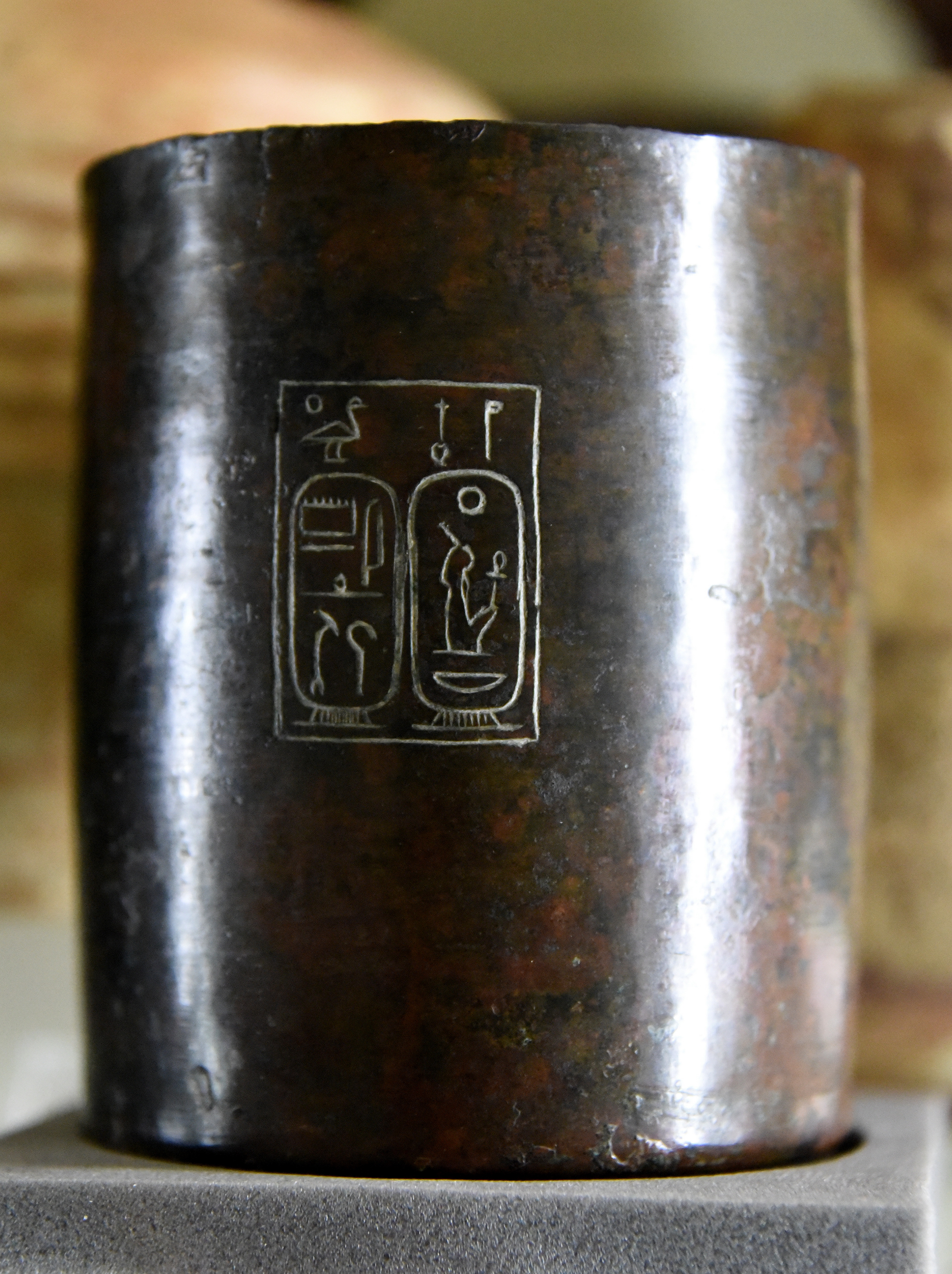
A bronze capacity measure inscribed with the cartouches of the birth and throne names of Amenhotep III of the 18th Dynasty

Units of volume appear in the mathematical papyri. For example, computing the volume of a circular granary in RMP 42 involves cubic cubits, khar, heqats, and quadruple heqats. RMP 80 divides heqats of grain into smaller henu.

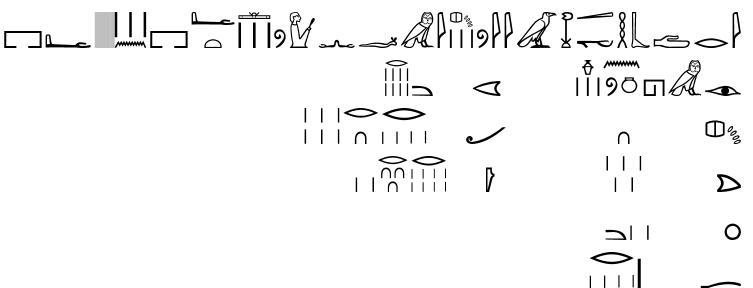
Problem 80 on the Rhind Mathematical Papyrus: As for vessels (debeh) used in measuring grain by the functionaries of the granary: done into henu, 1 hekat makes 10; 1/2 makes 5; 1/4 makes 2 1/2; etc.

Units of Volume
| Names | | | Equivalents | | |
| English | Egyptian | | Heqats | Ro | Metric |
|---|---|---|---|---|---|
| Ro | r | r | 1/320 | 1 | 0.015 L |
| Dja | | dja | 1/16 | 20 | 0.30 L |
| Jar; Hinu | h n W24 V1 W22 | hnw | 1/10 | 32 | 0.48 L |
| Barrel; Heqat; Hekat | U9 | hqt | 1 | 320 | 4.8 L |
| Double Barrel; Double Heqat; Double Hekat | | hqty | 2 | 640 | 9.6 L |
| Quadruple Heqat (MK); Oipe (NK) | T14 U9 i p t U9 | hqt-fdw jpt ipt | 4 | 1,280 | 19.2 L |
| Sack; Khar | Aa1 r | khar | 20 (MK); 16 (NK) | 6,400 (MK); 5120 (NK) | 96.5 L (MK); 76.8 L (NK) |
| Deny; Cubic cubit | | deny | 30 | 9,600 | 144 L |

The oipe was also formerly romanized as the apet.

== Weight ==
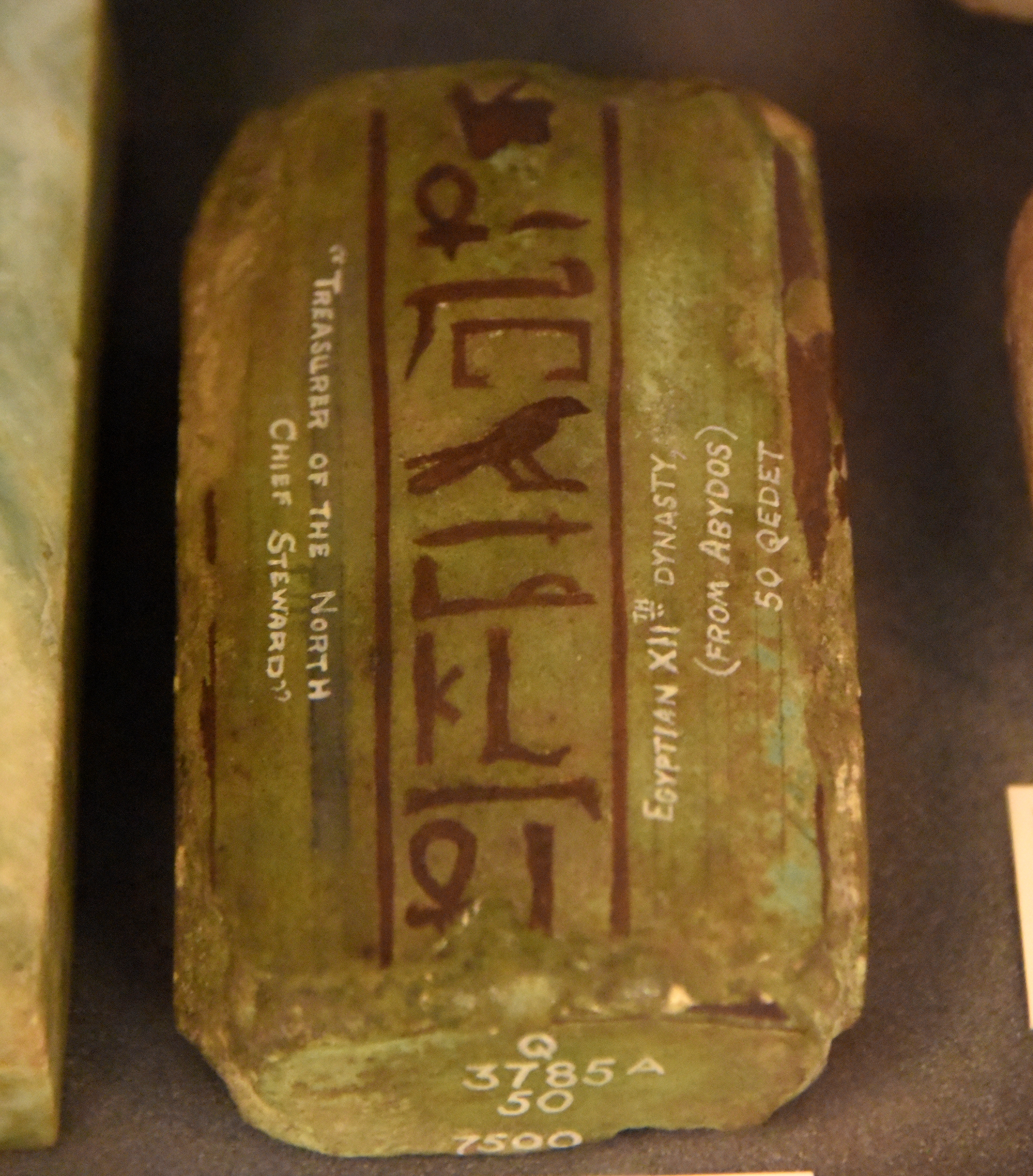
Green glazed faience weight discovered at Abydos, inscribed for the high steward Aabeni during the late Middle Kingdom

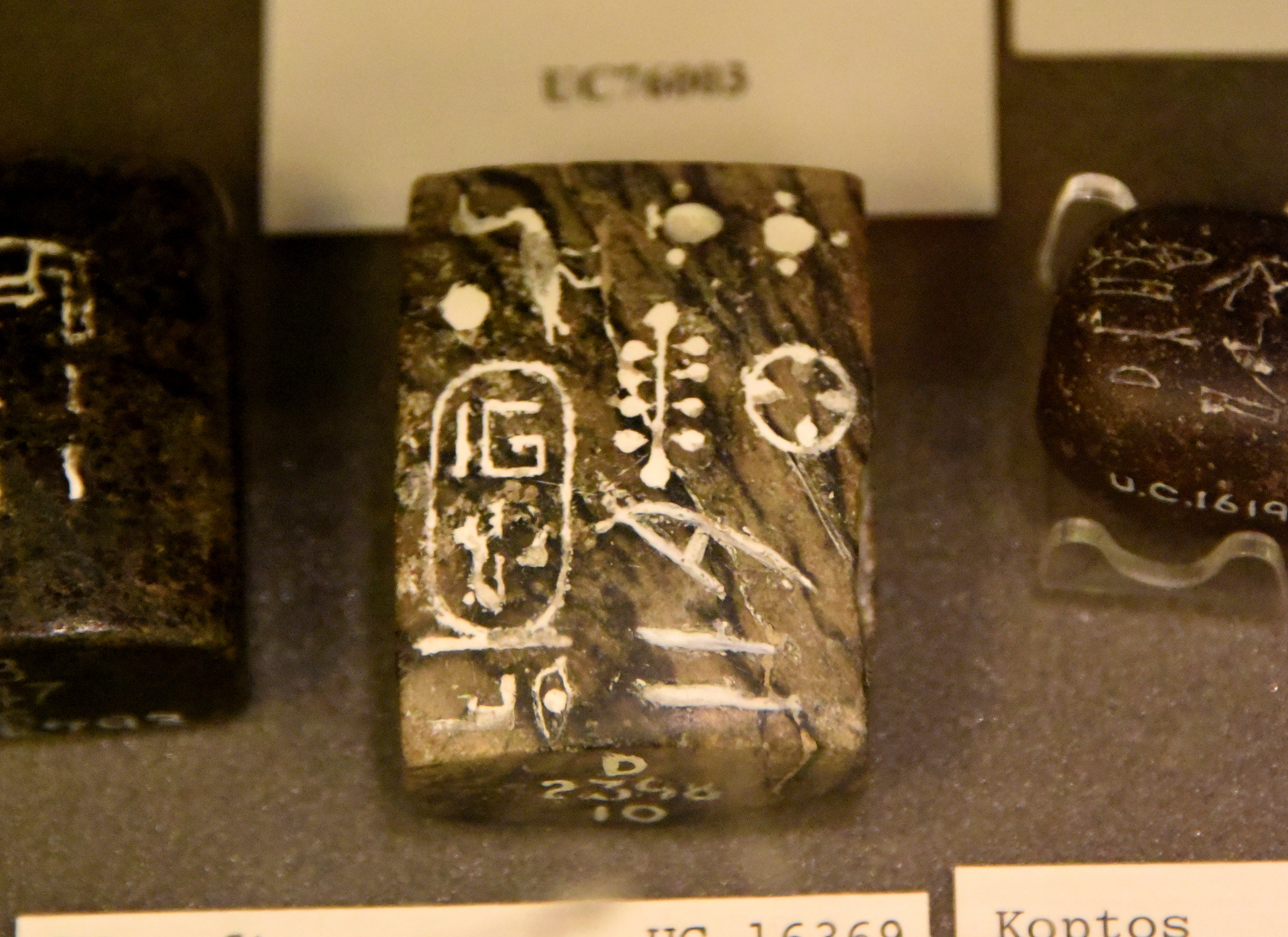
Serpentine weight of 10 daric, inscribed for Taharqa during the 25th Dynasty

Weights were measured in terms of deben. This unit would have been equivalent to 13.6 grams in the Old Kingdom and Middle Kingdom. During the New Kingdom however it was equivalent to 91 grams. For smaller amounts the qedet (1/10 of a deben) and the shematy (1/12 of a deben) were used.

Units of Weight
| Names | | | Equivalents | |
| English | Egyptian | | Debens | Metric |
|---|---|---|---|---|
| Piece; Shematy | | shȝts | 1/12 | |
| Qedet; Kedet; Kite | Aa28 X1 S106 | qdt | 1/10 | |
| Deben | D46 D58 N35 F46 | dbn | 1 | 13.6 g (OK & MK); 91 g (NK) |

The qedet or kedet is also often known as the kite, from the Coptic form of the same name (ⲕⲓⲧⲉ or ⲕⲓϯ). In 19th-century sources, the deben and qedet are often mistakenly transliterated as the uten and kat respectively, although this was corrected by the 20th century.

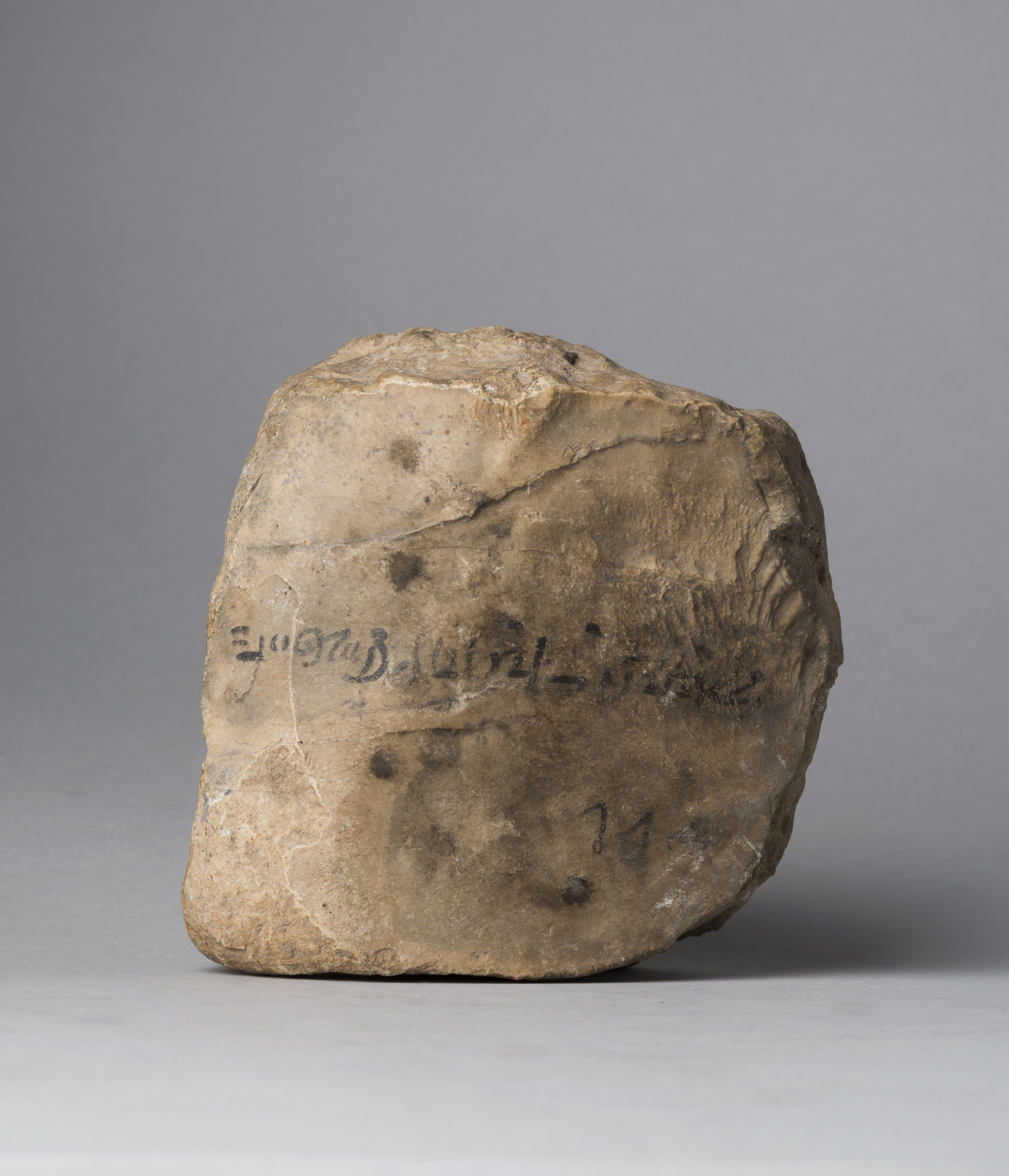
15-deben weight (about 1450 gr.), limestone, New Kingdom, 19th Dynasty–20th Dynasty, 1292–1077 BC, from Deir el-Medina. Museo Egizio, Turin (S. 9651).

== Time ==
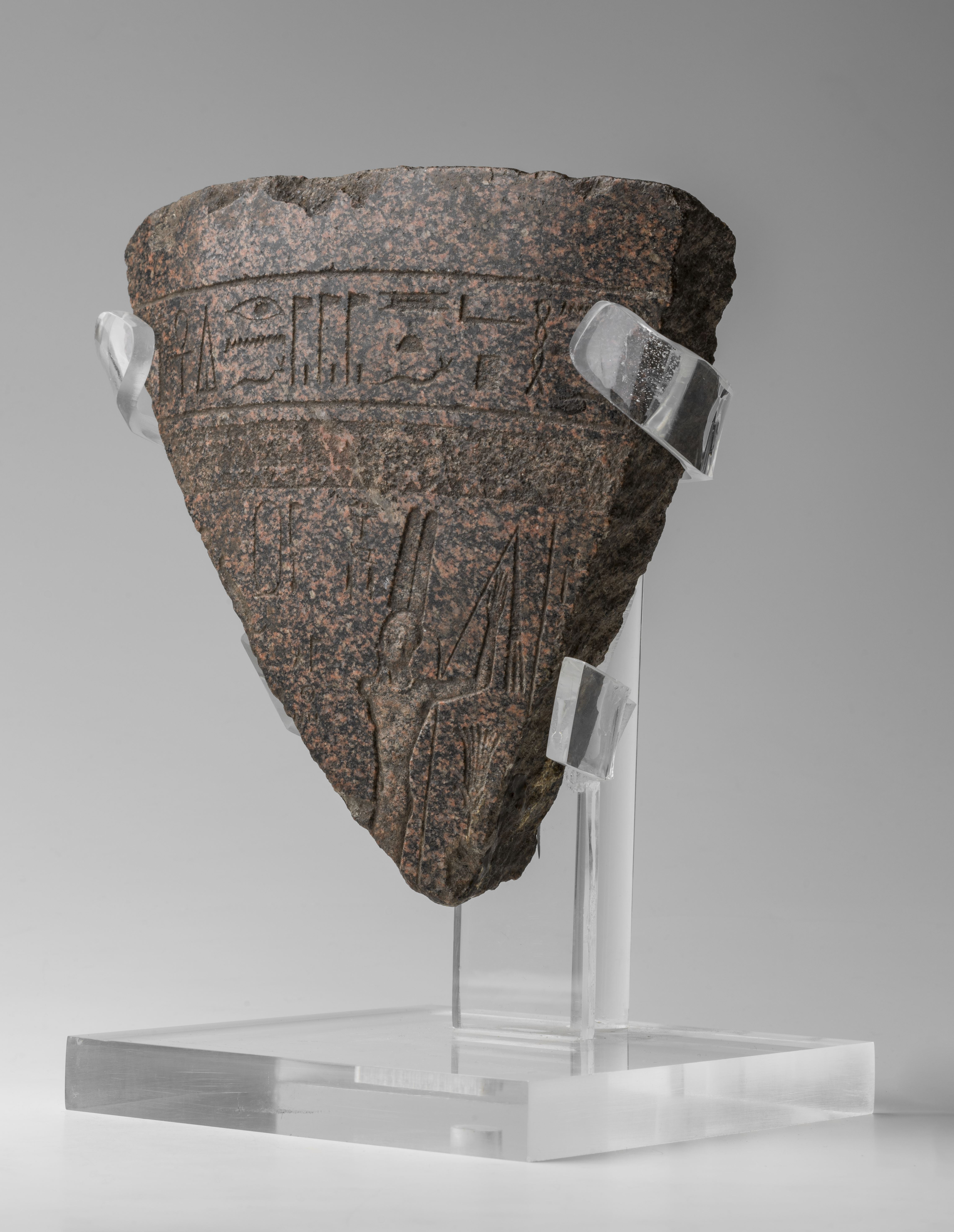
Fragment of a water clock with the ithyphallic god Min and a pharaoh, red granite, Late Period, 30th Dynasty, 380–343 BC. Museo Egizio, Turin (S. 8).

The former annual flooding of the Nile organized prehistoric and ancient Egypt into three seasons: Akhet ("Flood"), Peret ("Growth"), and Shemu or Shomu ("Low Water" or "Harvest").

The Egyptian civil calendar in place by Dynasty V followed regnal eras resetting with the ascension of each new pharaoh. It was based on the solar year and apparently initiated during a heliacal rising of Sirius following a recognition of its rough correlation with the onset of the Nile flood. It followed none of these consistently, however. Its year was divided into 3 seasons, 12 months, 36 decans, or 360 days with another 5 epagomenal days—celebrated as the birthdays of five major gods but feared for their ill luck—added "upon the year". The Egyptian months were originally simply numbered within each season but, in later sources, they acquired names from the year's major festivals and the three decans of each one were distinguished as "first", "middle", and "last". It has been suggested that during the Nineteenth Dynasty and the Twentieth Dynasty the last two days of each decan were usually treated as a kind of weekend for the royal craftsmen, with royal artisans free from work. This scheme lacked any provision for leap year intercalation until the introduction of the Alexandrian calendar by Augustus in the 20s BC, causing it to slowly move through the Sothic cycle against the solar, Sothic, and Julian years. Dates were typically given in a YMD format.

The civil calendar was apparently preceded by an observational lunar calendar which was eventually made lunisolar (Note: Parker extensively developed the thesis that the predynastic lunar calendar was already lunisolar, using intercalary months every 2 or 3 years to maintain Sirius's return to the night sky in its twelfth month, but no evidence of such intercalation exists predating the schematic lunisolar calendar developed in 4th century BC.) and fixed to the civil calendar, probably in 357 BC. The months of these calendars were known as "temple months" and used for liturgical purposes until the closing of Egypt's pagan temples under Theodosius I in the AD 390s and the subsequent suppression of individual worship by his successors.

Smaller units of time were vague approximations for most of Egyptian history. Hours—known by a variant of the word for "stars"—were initially only demarcated at night and varied in length. They were measured using decan stars and by water clocks. Equal 24-part divisions of the day were only introduced in 127 BC. Division of these hours into 60 equal minutes is attested in Ptolemy's 2nd-century works.

Units of Time
| Name | | | Days |
| English | Egyptian | | Days |
|---|---|---|---|
| hour | E34 N35 W24 X1 N14 N5 (Note: Variant representations of hour include E34 N35 D54, E34 N35 W24 X1 N5, E34 N35 W24 X1 N14, E34 N35 W24 G43 X1 N14 N5 Z1, E34 N35 W24 X1 N14 X1 N5 Z1, E34 N35 W24 X1 N2 N5 Z1, E34 N35 W24 X1 N2 D6 (properly with a star at the end of the line and a second shorter line to its right),E34 N35 W24 Z7 N14 N5 Z2, N5 Z2, N14 V13 N5, N14 V13 N5 Z2, N14 X1 N5, N14 X1 N5 Z2, N14 X1 Z1, T14 X1 N5, and E34 N35 W24 X1 N14. As nwt, hour also appears as N35 U19 W24 G43 X1 N5.) | wnwt | variable |
| day | S29 S29 S29 Z7 N5 (Note: Variant representations of day include N5, S29 S29 S29 G43 N5, and S29 S29 Z4 N5. In the plural sww, it appears as O35 G43 N5 Z2 S29 G43 N5 Z2 and S29 S29 S29 N5. As hrw ("daytime", "day"), it appears as N5 Z1, O4 N5, Z5 N5 Z1, O1 D21 N5 Z1, O4 G1 D21 N5 Z1, O4 G1 D21 Z7 N5 Z1, O4 G1 Z7 N5 Z1, O4 G43 N5 Z1, O4 Z1 G43 N5, O4 Z5 N5 Z1, O4 Z5 X1 N5, O4 Z5 Z5 N5, O4 Z5 Z5 Z1, and O4 D21 G43 N5 Z1. As rꜥ ("sun", "day"), it appears as N5, N5 Z1, and D21 D36 N5 Z1. As ḏt, day appears as I10 X1 Z1 D12, although properly the loaf and stroke are smaller and fit within the curve of the snake.) | sw | 1 |
| decan decade week | S29 S29 S29 Z7 N5 V20 (Note: Variant representations of decan include S29 S29 Z7 N5 V20.) | "ten-day" sw mḏ | 10 |
| month | N11 N14 D46 N5 (Note: Variant representations of month include N11, N11 N14, N11 N14 D46, N11 N14 D46, N11 N14 D46 N5 Z1, N11 N14 D46 Z7 N5, N11 N14 Z1 D46 N5 Z1, and N11 N14 Z5 Z5 N5. In the plural ꜣbdtyw, it appears as N11 N14 D46 G4 Z7 Z7 X1 N5. As ꜣbdw, month appears as G1 N11 D46 G43.) | ꜣbd | 30 |
| season | M17 X1 D21 G43 M6 | ı͗trw (Note: In the plural ı͗trw, "seasons" appears as M17 V13 D21 G43 M5 (properly with a triangular leaf), M17 X1 D21 G43 M4 M4 M4 N5 N5 N5, and M17 X1 D21 E23 M5 M5 M5, although properly the palm branches of the last are reversed. As tr ("time", "period", "season"), it appears as M6 N5, M17 X1 D21 N5, X1 D21 M6 N5, and X1 D21 M17 M6 N5. In the dual number, this appears as trwy in X1 D21 G43 M6 N5 N5, X1 D21 M6 N5 N5, and X1 D21 M17 M6 Z4 G43 N5 N5. In the plural, this appears as trw in M17 G43 X1 D21 G43 M6 N5 Z2, M17 X1 D21 M6 N5 Z2, and X1 D21 G43 M4 N5 Z2.) | 120 |
| year | M4 X1 Z1 (Note: Variant representations of year include M5, M7 X1 Z1, M4 X1 and M4 X1 Z1 G7. In the plural rnpwt, it appears as D21 N35 Q3 Z2 on the Naucratis Stela and as M4 M4 M4, M4 M4 M4 X1 Z1 Y1 Z2, M4 M4 M4 X1 Z2, M4 X1 Z1 Z3A, M4 X1 Z2, and M4 Z3.) | rnpt | 365; 365 1/4 |

== See also ==
- Egyptian hieroglyphics and Transliteration of Ancient Egyptian
- Ancient Egyptian mathematics and technology
- Egyptian calendar and astronomy
- Ancient Mesopotamian, Hebrew, Persian, Greek, Roman, and Byzantine units of measurement
- Modern Egyptian units of measurement & Metric system
