= Bobby Kuntz =

Canadian football player (1932–2011)

Profile
- Positions: Linebacker, Fullback, Defensive back

Personal information
- Born: January 10, 1932; Detroit, Michigan
- Died: February 7, 2011 (aged 79); Waterloo, Ontario
- Listed height: 5 ft 11 in (1.80 m)
- Listed weight: 190 lb (86 kg)

Career information
- University: McMaster

Career history
- 1953–1955: Kitchener-Waterloo Dutchmen
- 1956–1961: Toronto Argonauts
- 1962–1966: Hamilton Tiger-Cats

Awards and highlights
- 2× Grey Cup champion (1963, 1965); CFL All-Star (1964); 3× CFL East All-Star (1957, 1962, 1964); 2× Outstanding Canadian player in the East Division (1957, 1961)

Robert John Kuntz Sr. (January 10, 1932 – February 7, 2011) was a professional Canadian football linebacker who played eleven seasons in the Canadian Football League for the Toronto Argonauts and the Hamilton Tiger-Cats. He was a part of the Tiger-Cats 1963 and 1965 Grey Cup winning teams.

== College ==
Kuntz's football career began when he moved from Cleveland to Kitchener, Ontario. He was discouraged by football coaches in Cleveland, but at St. Jerome's High School he found Clem Faust, a coach willing to support his desire to play. After playing for McMaster University in Hamilton, and a senior football team in Ontario, he was signed by the Argonauts in 1955 to play his first full season in the CFL. Ten years later, his older brother David died and he was forced with a difficult decision: to return home to join the family electroplating business, or to continue playing football. His decision to return home was short-lived, after only a few months he was coaxed out of retirement by Jim Trimble, coach of the Argo's main rival, the Hamilton Tiger-Cats.

== Canadian Football league ==
Bobby Kuntz joined the Toronto Argonauts in 1956 and stayed with them for 6 years before being traded to the Hamilton Tiger-cats in 1962. He was a 2-way player at linebacker and fullback. In his rookie year, he carried the ball 108 times for 578 yards for a 5.4 yard/rush average. His best rushing year was 1962, when he carried 151 times for 813 yards, a 5.4 average, and 6 touchdowns. in his career, he caught 107 balls for 1318 yards, a 12.3 average. As a linebacker, he intercepted 10 balls, 4 in 1957. He also served as an occasional kick returner. he was voted as an eastern conference all-star at three different positions: defensive back in 1957, fullback in 1962, and linebacker in 1964.

== Post CFL ==
On returning home after retirement, and rejoining the family business, he became heavily involved in the community. Bobby was a founding member of St. Francis Assisi Parish, and involved with St. Mary's General Hospital Foundation, Mosaic Counselling and Family Services, the United Way, the Congregation of the Resurrection and St. Jerome's University.

Kuntz was the co-owner of the family's surface finishing company Kuntz Electroplating. He was involved with the business from his retirement in 1966 from football until shortly before his death along with his brother Paul who predeceased him in early 2011. Bobby was diagnosed with Parkinson's disease in 2000, and lived in nursing homes in the last years of his life.

On February 7, 2011, Kuntz died due to complications from Parkinson's disease at the age of 79 in Waterloo, Ontario, surrounded by his wife and children.
