= Egyptian units of measurement =

Units of measurement used in Egypt

A number of units of measurement were used in Egypt to measure length, mass, area, capacity, etc. In Egypt, the metric system was made optional in 1873 and has been compulsory in government use since 1891.

== Units during the ending of the 19th century ==
A number of units were used in Egypt. Units and their interrelations were very variable in the national system. Since 1891 their metric equivalences have been defined.

=== Length ===
A number of units were used to measure length. One derah baladi was equal to 0.58 m and one kassabah was equal to 3.55 m, according to the metric equivalences defined in 1891. Some other units according to the metric equivalences defined in 1891 are given below:

1 kirat = 1/24 dirra

1 abdat = 1/6 dirra

1 kadam = 1/2 dirra

1 pic = 1 dirra

1 gasab = 4 dirra

1 mil hachmi = 1000 dirra

1 farsakh = 3000 dirra

There were six kinds of derah (a.k.a. dirra) as follows: 1 Nile pic = 0.2545 m, 1 native pic (derah baladi) = 0.5682 m, 1 Constantinople pic (derah Istambuli) = 0.6691 m, 1 cloth pic (derah hendazeh) = 0.6479 m, 1 builder's pic (derah meimari) = 0.7500 m, 1 itinerary pic (aka. road-measure pic) = 0.7389 m.

==== Road Measures ====
One itenery derah was equal to 0.7389 m. Some other units according to the metric equivalences defined in 1891 are given below:

1 cassaba = 5 derah

1 bââh = 2 1/2 derah

1 mili = 500 cassabas = 1.148 miles (1.847 km)

1 farsakh (league) = 3 mili 1 baride = 4 farsakh

1 safar yome (of which 2 1/2 make 1° of the meridian = 60 mili) = 2 baride.

=== Mass ===
A number of units were used to measure mass. One oke was equal to 1.248 kg, according to the metric equivalences defined in 1891. Some other units according to the metric equivalences defined in 1891 are given below:

1 kirat = 1/6400 oke

1 dirhem = 1/400 oke

1 miskal = 8/800 oke

1 okieh = 0.03 oke

1 rotoli = 0.36 oke

1 kantar = 36 oke

1 helm = 200 oke

One harsela, used for weighing silk, is one oke.

=== Area ===
A number of units were used to measure area. One feddan was equal to 4200.8 m^{2}, according to the metric equivalences defined in 1891. Some other units according to the metric equivalences defined in 1891 are given below:

1 sahme = 1/576 feddan

1 kirat kamel = 1/24 feddan

1 feddan masri = 1 feddan.

Squares of derah and cassaba (3.55 m) was used to partly measure lands.

=== Capacity ===
Two main systems, liquid and dry were used in Egypt.

==== Liquid Measure ====
One guirbeh was equal to 70.4467 quarts (66 2/3 litres).

==== Dry Measure ====
A number of units were used to measure capacity. One keddah was equal to 2.0625 L, according to the metric equivalences defined in 1891. Some other units according to the metric equivalences defined in 1891 are given below:

1 kirat = 1/32 keddah

1 khanoubah = 1/16 keddah

1 toumnah = 1/8 keddah

1 robhah = 1/4 keddah

1 nisf keddah = 1/2 keddah

1 malouah = 2 keddah

1 rob (roubouh) = 4 keddah

1 keila = 8 keddah

1 ardeb = 96 keddah

1 daribah = 768 keddah

Before 1891, according to the report of the United States Commissioners to the Paris Exposition of 1867, 1 ardeb was equal to 2.603 bushels (91.72 L). Other authorities give the ardeb = 5.1648 bushels. One ardeb of Alexandria was equal to 7.6907 bushels.
