= On Weights and Measures =

Literary work composed by Epiphanius of Salamis

- Author: Epiphanius of Salamis
- Original title: Περὶ μέτρων καὶ στάθμων
- Genre: Non-fiction
- Publication date: 392 AD
- Publication place: Ancient Greece

On Weights and Measures is a historical, lexical, metrological, and geographical treatise compiled in 392 AD in Constantia by Epiphanius of Salamis (c. 315–403). The greater part of the work is devoted to a discussion on Greek and Roman weights and measures.

The composition was written at the request of a Persian priest, sent to Epiphanius by letter from the Roman emperor in Constantinople. (Note: The letter was apparently signed jointly by Valentinian II, emperor of the West, and Theodosius, emperor of the East, as well as Theodosius' two sons, Arcadius and Honorius.) Although five fragments of an early Greek version are known to exist, with one entitled Περὶ μέτρων καὶ στάθμων (transl. On Weights and Measures), added by a later hand, this Syriac version is the only complete copy that has survived. Partial translations in Armenian and Georgian (Note: Found in the "Shatberd codex" MS. 1141, in the library of the Obshchestvo rasprostranenifa gramotnosti sredi gruzin, Tiflis) are also known to exist. Its modern title belies its content, as the work also contains important historical anecdotes about people and places not written about elsewhere.

Two manuscripts of On Weights and Measures, written in Syriac on parchment, are preserved at the British Museum in London. The older was found in Egypt and, according to the colophon, was written in the Seleucid era, in "nine-hundred and sixty-[...]" (with the last digit effaced, meaning, that it was written between the years 649–659 AD).

The first to attempt a modern publication of Epiphanius' work was Paul de Lagarde in 1880, who reconstructed the original Syriac text by exchanging it with Hebrew characters, and who had earlier published excerpts from several of the Greek fragments treating on weights and measures in his Symmicta. In 1973, a critical edition of the Greek text was published by E.D. Moutsoulas in Theologia.

== Synopsis ==
=== Part One ===
In folios [54b–55c], Hadrian's journey and arrival in the East is dated "47 years after the destruction of Jerusalem."

- Translations

In folios [47a–49a]; [51d–52a]; [56d–57b] Epiphanius names four major translations of the Hebrew Bible, made in the Greek tongue: the LXX made by the seventy-two translators, another by Aquila of Pontus, one by Theodotion, and yet another by Symmachus. A fifth Greek translation was discovered in wine jars in Jericho, and a sixth in Nicopolis near Actium. Afterwards, Origen arranged six columns of the extant Greek translations and two of the Hebrew side by side, naming it the Hexapla. Epiphanius expands his description of the translation of the seventy-two translators (known as the Septuagint) and how they were assigned thirty-six cells, two to each cell, on the Pharian island. Two translators translated the Book of Genesis, another two the Book of Exodus, another two the Book of Leviticus, and so forth, until the entire 22 canonical books of the Hebrew Bible (today there are 24) had all been translated into the Greek tongue. (Note: Excluding Ecclesiastes and the Song of Solomon, which books had only later been added to the canon, according to Jewish tradition.) The seventy-two translators were drawn from the twelve tribes of Israel, six men to each tribe who were skilled in the Greek language.

In folios [49a–50a] Epiphanius gives a description of the canonical books of the Hebrew Bible and translations made of the same. In his day, he notes that the Scroll of Ruth and the Book of Judges were joined together, and considered as one book. So, too, the Books of Ezra and Nehemiah were joined, and considered as one book, as were First and Second Chronicles (Paraleipomena) considered as one book, as were the First and Second Samuel (Book of First and Second Kingdoms) considered as one book, and the First and Second Kings (Book of Third and Fourth Kingdoms) considered as one book.

=== Part Two ===
- Prominent figures

In spite of Epiphanius' interest in Jewish themes, his narrative often takes on a distorted and stereotypical view of Judaism. Still, he is an invaluable source on the lives of people and places that figure highly in Jewish lore. In folios [54a–55c]; [55c–55d] Epiphanius treats on the lives of two prominent persons who became proselytes to the Jewish religion; the one Aquila (known also as Onkelos) who was a relation of Hadrian, and whom he made the overseer of Jerusalem's rebuilding around 115 AD. The other person of interest who is described by him is Symmachus, also known as Sūmkos (Hebrew: סומכוס) in rabbinic literature. Symmachus is mentioned as belonging originally to the Samaritan nation, and is said to have converted to Judaism during the reign of Verus. (Note: According to Epiphanius, Marcus Aurelius was also called Verus.) He subsequently underwent a second circumcision and became a disciple of Rabbi Meir. Symmachus belonged to the fifth generation (165–200 CE) of Rabbinical teachers referred to in the text of the Mishnah. The Emperor Hadrian is said to have passed through Palestine while en route to Egypt, some 47 years after the destruction of Jerusalem.

=== Part Three ===
- Weights and Measures

Folios [61d–73b] contain a treatise on the known weights and measures used in his day among the Hebrews, the Greeks and the Romans. He states the equivalent weights for the kab (cab), kor, the lethekh (Lethek), homer, bath, modius (Hebrew: seah = lit. "measure"), and mina (Hebrew: maneh), among others. Epiphanius, explaining the sense of certain obscure passages in the original Aramaic New Testament, writes: "The talent is called Maneh (mina) among the Hebrews," the equivalent of 100 denarii. In folios [62b–62c] Epiphanius distinguishes between "a handful" (Hebrew: מְלֹא כַף) in I Kings 17:12 and "a handful" (Hebrew: מְלֹא חֹפֶן) in Exodus 9:8 and Leviticus 16:12; in the former case it refers to only one handful, but in latter cases it refers to "a measure of two handfuls."

=== Part Four ===
- Geography of Palestine, Asia Minor and the Levant

In folios [73b–75a] Epiphanius gives the names of several cities and places of renown, both in his time and in ancient times, such as: Mount Ararat (§ 61), Aṭaṭ (§ 62), or what is known as the "threshing floor of the thorn bush" (Hebrew: גרן האטד), and whose description echoes that of Rashi's commentary on Genesis 50:10, (Note: Said to be a place about two miles from the Jordan River, called Beth-ḥagla (lit. 'the place of the circuit').) Abarim (§ 63); Aviʿazar (§ 68), or what is Eḇen haʿezer of I Samuel 4:1, said to be "fourteen [Roman] miles distant east and north of Eleutheropolis, in a valley"; Carmel (§ 77); Carmel of the sea (§ 78); Akko (§ 76); Anathoth (§ 66); Azekah (§ 64) - a city in whose time was called Ḥ^{ǝ}warta; (Note: R. Steven Notley & Ze'ev Safrai, in their book, "Eusebius, Onomasticon - The Place Names of Divine Scripture (Brill: Leiden 2005, p. 19, note 47), have noted: "According to his (Epiphanius') formulation, it would seem that he was of the opinion that Hiwarta, which means 'white' (lavan), is the translation of Azekah. About 5 kilometres (3.1 mi) to the southeast of Tell Zechariah is a high hill called Tell el-Beida, meaning in Arabic 'white'. In current maps, the site is named Tell Livnin, which means the 'hill of bricks' (livanim), and it is to this that Eusebius (who also wrote about Azekah) most probably referred. 'Azekah' is not 'white', either in Hebrew or in Aramaic. Le-azek in Hebrew means 'to remove stones', and then the soil appears a bit paler. It therefore appears that Epiphanius, who was born in Beit Zedek, near Eleutheropolis, identified Azekah with Tell el-Beida. Azekah is 6 kilometres (3.7 mi) from Eleutheropolis, and Tell Livnin is 8 kilometres (5.0 mi) from there. Epiphanius adapted the new name to the identification by means of an etymological exegesis that has no linguistic basis. At any rate, no settlement existed on Tell Azekah in the Roman-Byzantine period. The early site moved from the high hill to the fields in the plain at the foot of the tell. It may possibly have moved as far as Kh. el-Beida, although this is difficult to accept.") Bethel (§ 73); Ophrah (§ 67); Carthage (§ 79) - where the Canaanites had migrated from Phoenicia and who were called in his day Bizakanoi (scattered people); Rekem (§ 71), Jaffa (§ 75), Jerusalem (§ 74), et al.

== Chronology of the Ptolemies ==
- Ptolemy (I), also called Soter (of the Rabbit [Lagos]) = reigned 40 years
- Ptolemy (II) Philadelphus = reigned 38 years
- Ptolemy (III) the Well-Doer (Euergetes) = 24 years
- Ptolemy (IV) Philopator = 21 years (Note: Ptolemy IV Philopator actually ruled about 17 years, from 221 BC to 204 BC.)
- Ptolemy (V) Epiphanes = 22 years (Note: Actually 24 years.)
- Ptolemy (VI) Philometor = 34 years
- Ptolemy (VIII) the Lover of Learning and the Well-Doer = 29 years
- Ptolemy the Savior (Soter) = 15 years (Note: Probably referring to Ptolemy IX, who was also named "Soter")
- Ptolemy (X) who is also Alexas = 12 years
- Ptolemy (IX) the brother of Alexas = 8 years
- Ptolemy (XII) Dionysius = 31 years
- Cleopatra, the daughter of Ptolemy = 32 years (Note: Actually 22 years)

== Chronology of the Roman emperors ==
- Augustus = reigned 56 years, 6 months (Note: Following Jerome's Chronicon (produced c. 380). Epiphanius dates Augustus accession to February 43 BC, which is greatly inaccurate. This is probably a misreading of "57 years, 6 months" or "56 years, 4 months".)
- Tiberius = reigned 23 years
- Gaius = 3 years, 9 months, 29 days (Note: Following Cassius Dio (30.1), who wrongly dates Tiberius' death to 26 March (28.5).)
- Claudius = 13 years, 1 month, 28 days (Note: 13 years, 8 months and 19 days. (Dio 61.34))
- Nero = 13 years, 7 months, 27 days (Note: Confirmed by Jerome (s.2070).)
- Galba = 7 months, 26 days (Note: a corruption of "7 months, 6 days".)
- Otho = 3 months, 5 days (Note: following Suetonius. (Otho, 11))
- Vitellius = reign: 8 months, 12 days (Note: actually 8 months and 2 days assuming Vitellius died on 20 December.)
- Vespasian = reign: 9 years, 7 months, 12 days (Note: reckoning from 22 December instead of 1 July 69, Vespasian's official dies imperii.)
- Titus = reign: 2 years, 2 months, 2 days (Note: "20 days" instead of "2" (Dio, 66.26).)
- Domitian = reign: 15 years, 5 months (Note: "5 days" instead of "5 months" (Dio 67, 18))
- Nerva = reign: 1 year, 4 months
- Trajan = reign: 19 years
- Hadrian = reign: 21 years
- Antoninus, surnamed Pius = reign: 22 years
- Marcus Aurelius Antoninus ("otherwise known as Verus", also "called Commodus Lucius") (Note: Marcus original name was probably "Marcus Annius Verus". No other source calls him "Commodus", but this may just be a confusion.) = reign: 19 years. Of these years, 7 years he ruled jointly with Lucius Aurelius Commodus
- Commodus II (Note: The numerals may represent repeated names. Regnal numbers didn't exist back then.) = reign: 13 years
- Pertinax = 6 months
- Severus (reigned jointly with his son, Antoninus) = reign: 18 years
- Caracalla, also called Geta, (Note: Geta was also Severus' heir and briefly ruled alongside Caracalla.) who is also Antoninus = reign: 7 years (ruled jointly with Lucius Aurelius Commodus) (Note: The text of Marcus Aurelius is repeated)
- Macrinus = 1 year
- Antoninus II = 4 years
- Alexander, the son of Mammaea = reign: 13 years
- Maximian = 3 years
- Gordian = 6 years (Note: Epiphanius combines the reigns of Gordian I, Gordian II and Gordian III, skipping over Pupienus and Balbinus.)
- Philip = 7 years
- Decius = 1 year, 3 months (Note: Decius probably reigned 1 year and 9 months.)
- Gallienus (Gallus), who ruled jointly with Volusianus = 2 years, 4 months (Note: Gallus and Volusianus actually reigned a little over a year.)
- Valerian, who ruled jointly with Gallienus, also known as Gallus = 12 years (Note: actually 15 years)
- Claudius = 1 year, 9 months
- Aurelian = 5 years, 6 months
- Tacitus = 6 months
- Probus = 6 years, 4 months
- Carus, who ruled jointly with his sons, Carinus and Numerian = 2 years
- Diocletian, who ruled jointly with Maximian, Constantine and Maxentius = 20 years
- Maximian (Galerius), Licinius and Constantine, who ruled in succession one after the other = 32 years
- Constans, Constantine and Constantius, followed by Julian, Jovian, Valentinian the Great, Valens, Gratian the son of Valentinian, Valentinian the younger (son of Valentinian), Theodosius, Arcadius the son of Theodosius, Honorius the Illustrious, who was the son of Theodosius, as far as the time of Epiphanius, during the second consulship of Arcadius Augustus and Rufus [year 392] . Years collected altogether: 57 years. (Note: Actually 55 years, but 56 if counted inclusively.)

The regnal years of the Caesars as stated by Epiphanius differ slightly in some places from the extant Greek sources. With respect to events in Rome after the reign of Pertinax, both Epiphanius and Jerome do not mention the ascension of Didius Julianus after the assassination of Pertinax, but write only that Severus succeeded him. This may have been because they did not consider his 9-week reign, which he obtained through usurpation, to be legitimate. Similarly, Epiphanius does not mention the ascension of Aemilian. It can be adduced from Jerome's Chronicon that Aemilian, who "caused a revolt in Moesia," was never officially confirmed by the Senate in Rome. Epiphanius' method of recording the regnal years from Augustus to Hadrian, with his pinpoint recollection of the number of months and days to each reign, can be said to be accurate, based on Josephus' own testimony about himself, saying that he was aged 56 in the 13th year of the reign of Caesar Domitian, and that he (Josephus) was born in the 1st year of Caesar Gaius. Using Epiphanius' chronology for the later empire, the years are collected as 56. By comparison, the span of years in Suetonius' De vita Caesarum (Lives of the Caesars), which gives 14 years for Claudius and 15 years for Nero, the same time frame would span a period of some 58 years.

== See also ==
- Chronograph of 354, which contains a similar list of rulers
- List of Roman emperors
- Canon of Kings

== Bibliography ==
- Dean, James Elmer (1935). Epiphanius' Treatise on Weights and Measures: The Syriac Version. The University of Chicago Press. OCLC 912074.
