= Omer =

Omer may refer to:

- Omer (unit), an ancient unit of measure used in the era of the ancient Temple in Jerusalem
- The Counting of the Omer (sefirat ha'omer), a 49 day period in the Jewish calendar

== People ==
- A variant spelling of the given name Omar (includes a list of Omers)
- Mordechai Omer (1940–2011), Israeli art historian and museum administrator

== Places ==
- Omer, Israel, a town near Beersheba
- Omer, Michigan, United States, the smallest city in Michigan

== Other uses ==
- Omer (submarine), the fastest human-powered submarine at the International Submarine Races
- Omer, a 2020 album by Omer Adam

== See also ==
- Saint Omer (disambiguation)
- OMERS (Ontario Municipal Employees Pension Scheme)
- Omar (disambiguation)
