= Homer (unit) =

Biblical unit of volume for liquids and dry goods

A homer (Hebrew: חֹמֶר ḥōmer, plural חמרם ḥomārim; also כֹּר kōr) is a biblical unit of volume used for liquids and dry goods. One homer is equal to 10 baths, or what was also equivalent to 30 seahs; each seah being the equivalent in volume to six kabs, and each kab equivalent in volume to 24 medium-sized eggs. One homer equals 220 litre or 220 dm^{3}

The homer should not be confused with the omer, which is a much smaller unit of dry measure.
