= Omar (disambiguation) =

Omar, also spelled Umar (c. 584–644), was a companion of the Islamic prophet Muhammad and the second Rashidun caliph.

It also may refer to:

== Name ==
- Omar (name), Arabic name (including a list of people named Omar, Omer, Umar, Umer, or other variants)
  - Ummer, Indian actor

== Film and television ==
- Omar (2013 film), a Palestinian drama film
- Omar (2024 film), a Bangladeshi action thriller film
- Umar (film), a 2006 Bollywood film directed by Karan Razdan
- Omar (TV series), a 2012 historical television series on MBC
- Omar Little, a character from The Wire, a television series
- Omar Zafar, a fictional villain in the 2014 Indian film Bang Bang!, portrayed by Danny Denzongpa

== Music ==
- Omar (album), 2005 album by Omar Naber
- Omar Lye-Fook or Omar (born 1968), British soul singer
- Omar (opera), 2022 American opera inspired by the writings and life of Omar ibn Said (c.1770–1864)

== Places ==
- Omar, Kunar, a village in Afghanistan
- Omar, Bushehr, a village in Bushehr Province, Iran
- Omar, Sulu, a municipality in the Philippines
- Omar, Delaware, an unincorporated community
- Omar, Ohio, an unincorporated community
- Omar, West Virginia, a census-designated place

== Other uses ==
- Omar (candy), a Finnish confectionery brand
- Umar (Marvel Comics), a comic book supervillain
- The ICAO code for Arzanah Airport
- The Oil Monopoly Alliance Regime (OMAR), a fictional organization in the Vigilante 8 vehicular combat video game series
- The Omar, a fictional cult in Deus Ex: Invisible War
- ASM-N-6 Omar, a U.S. Navy air-to-surface missile
- Hurricane Omar, a 2008 Atlantic hurricane
- Organization for Mine Clearance and Afghan Rehabilitation, a charitable non-governmental organisation

== See also ==
- Masjid Umar, a list of mosques
- Omagh, the county town of County Tyrone in Northern Ireland
- Omarolluk, a feature sometimes found in sedimentary rocks
- Omer (disambiguation)
- Pact of Umar (c. 717 AD), an edict of the caliph Umar ibn Khattab
- Umar Khel, a division of the Pashtun tribe Kakazai
- Umar Marvi, a Sindhi love story
