= Omer (unit) =

Historical unit of measurement

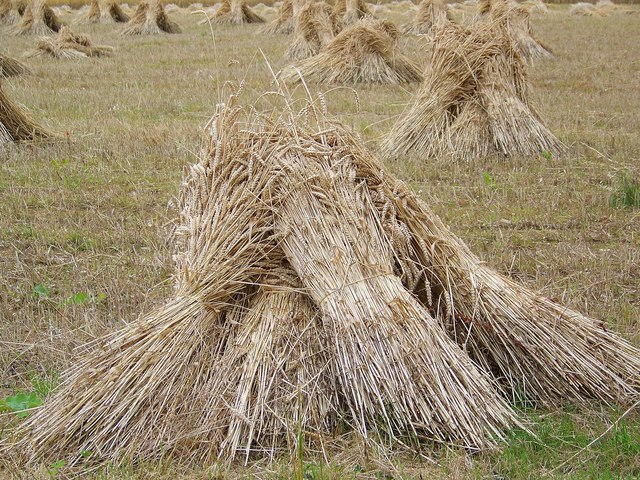
Sheaves of wheat: one sheaf is approximately one omer in dry volume.

The omer (Hebrew: עֹ֫מֶר ‘ōmer) is an ancient Israelite unit of dry measure used in the era of the Temple in Jerusalem and also known as an isaron. It is used in the Bible as an ancient unit of volume for grains and dry commodities, and the Torah mentions it as being equal to one tenth of an ephah. According to the Jewish Encyclopedia (1906), an ephah was defined as being 72 logs, and the Log was equal to the Sumerian mina, which was itself defined as one sixtieth of a maris; the omer was thus equal to about 12/100 of a maris. The maris was defined as being the quantity of water equal in weight to a light royal talent, and was thus equal to about 30.3 L (8.0 US gal), making the omer equal to about 3.64 L (0.96 US gal), or 0.799 imperial gallons. The Jewish Study Bible (2014), however, places the omer at about 2.3 L (0.61 US gal).

In traditional Jewish standards of measurement, the omer was equivalent to the volume of 43.2 chicken's eggs, or what is also known as one-tenth of an ephah (three seahs). In dry weight, the omer weighed between 1.56–1.77 kg (3.4–3.9 lb), being the quantity of flour required to separate therefrom the dough offering.

The word omer is sometimes translated as "sheaf" — specifically, an amount of grain large enough to require bundling. The biblical episode of the manna describes God as instructing the Israelites to collect an omer for each person in your tent, implying that each person could eat an omer of manna a day. In ritual, the Omer offering (which began the Counting of the Omer) consisted of an omer's quantity of freshly harvested grain. During the Temple period, the offering of the omer was one of twenty-four priestly gifts, and one of the ten which were offered to priests within the Temple precincts, when Jewish farmers would bring the first of that year's grain crop to Jerusalem.

== See also ==
- Biblical and Talmudic units of measurement
- Counting of the omer
- Omer (disambiguation)
- Omer offering
