= Pim weight =

Early Israelite weight equal to about two-thirds of a shekel

Pim weights (Hebrew פִּים pîm) were polished weight-stones about 15 mm (5/8 inch) diameter, equal to about two-thirds of a Hebrew shekel. Many specimens have been found since their initial discovery early in the 20th century, weighing about 7.6 grams, compared to 11.5 grams of a shekel. These weights were equivalent to the weight of a pîm and was confirmed by the inscription across the top of their dome: the Paleo-Hebrew letters 𐤐𐤉𐤌 (pym).

Drawing of the first Pim weight ever published; found at Gezer

== Impact ==
Prior to the discovery of the weights by archaeologists, scholars did not know how to translate the word פִּים (pîm) in 1 Samuel 13:21. The 1611 translation of the King James Version of the Bible rendered the verse thus:

Yet they had a file for the mattocks, and for the coulters, and for the forks, and for the axes, and to sharpen the goads.

Robert Alexander Stewart Macalister's excavations at Gezer (1902-1905 and 1907-1909) were published in 1912 with an illustration showing one such weight, which Macalister compared to another published in 1907 by Charles Simon Clermont-Ganneau.

Based on this discovery, subsequent biblical translations were improved. The 1982 New King James Version rendered 1 Samuel 13:21:

And the charge for a sharpening was a pim for the plowshares, the mattocks, the forks, and the axes, and to set the points of the goads.

== Photos ==
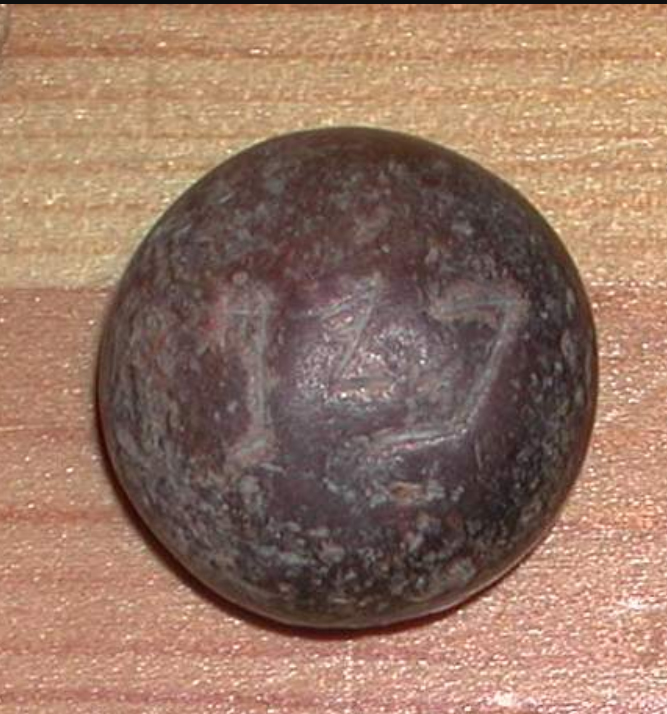
Top-view of an unprovenanced pim weight

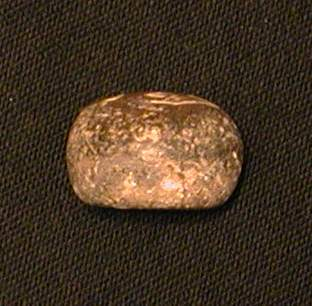
Side-view of an unprovenanced pim weight

== See also ==
- Ancient Hebrew units of measurement
- Biblical archaeology
- List of artifacts significant to the Bible

== Sources ==
- Macalister, R. A. Stewart (1912). The Excavation of Gezer 1902-1905 and 1907-1909 Vol. II. London: John Murray. p. 285.
- Avraham Negev; Shimon Gibson, eds. (2003). Archaeological Encyclopedia of the Holy Land. New York: The Continuum International Publishing Group Inc. pp. 537–9.
