= Shavuot =

Jewish holiday

Shavuоt
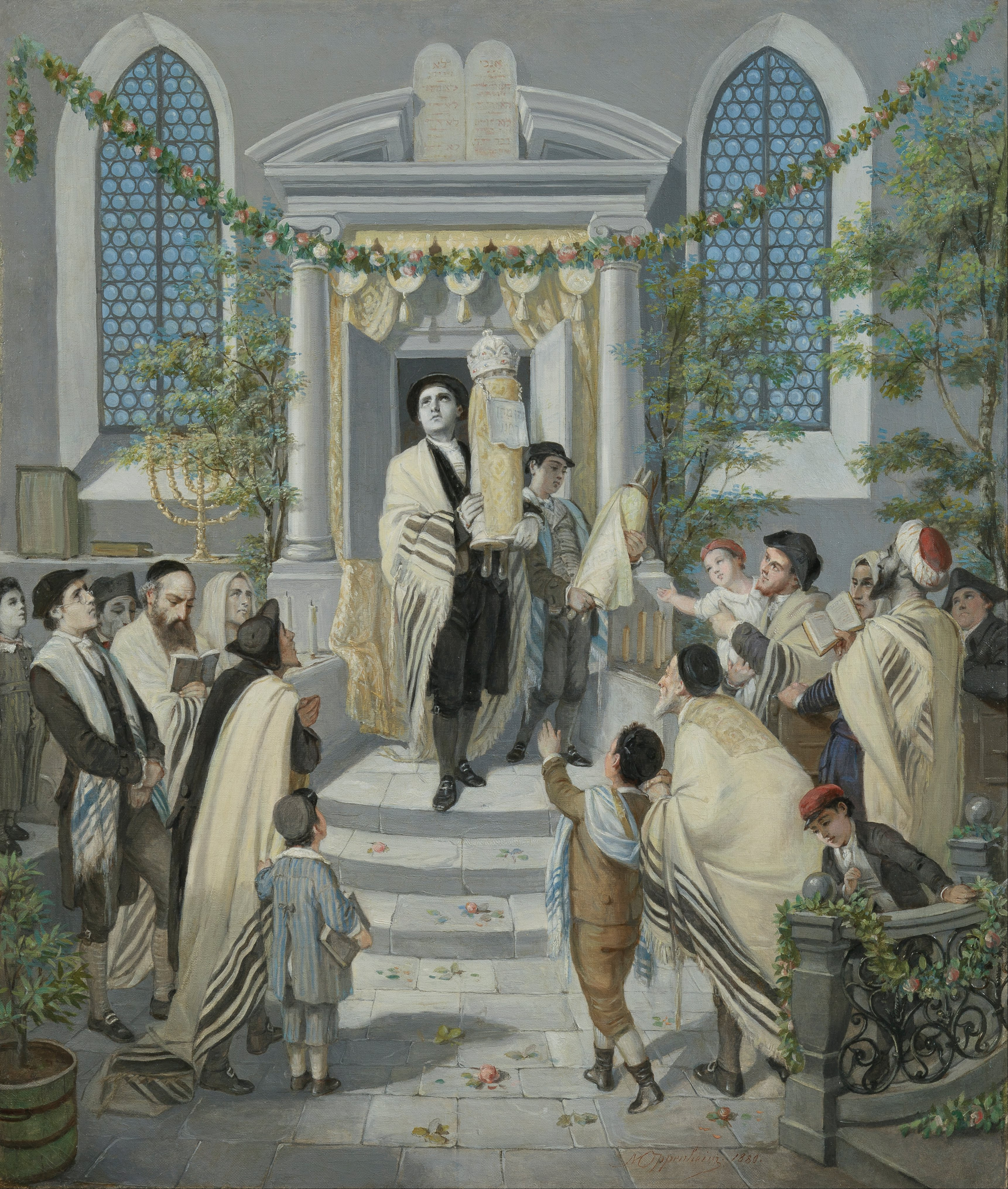
- Shavuot by Moritz Daniel Oppenheim
- Official name: Hebrew: שבועות or חג השבועות (Ḥag HaShavuot or Shavuos)
- Observed by: Jews and Samaritans
- Type: Jewish and Samaritan
- Significance: One of the Three Pilgrimage Festivals. Commemorates the giving of the Ten Commandments by God to Moses and to the Israelites at Mount Sinai, 49 days (seven weeks) after the Exodus from ancient Egypt. Commemorates the wheat harvesting in the Land of Israel. Culmination of the 49 days of the Counting of the Omer.
- Celebrations: Festive meals. All-night Torah study. Recital of Akdamut liturgical poem in Ashkenazic synagogues. Reading of the Book of Ruth. Eating of dairy products. Decoration of homes and synagogues with greenery (Orach Chayim, 494).
- Begins: 6th day of Sivan (or the Sunday following the 6th day of Sivan in Karaite Judaism)
- Ends: 7th (in Israel: 6th) day of Sivan
- Date: 6 Sivan
- 2025 date: Sunset, 1 June – nightfall, 3 June
- 2026 date: Sunset, 21 May – nightfall, 23 May
- 2027 date: Sunset, 10 June – nightfall, 12 June
- 2028 date: Sunset, 30 May – nightfall, 1 June
- Related to: Passover, which precedes Shavuot

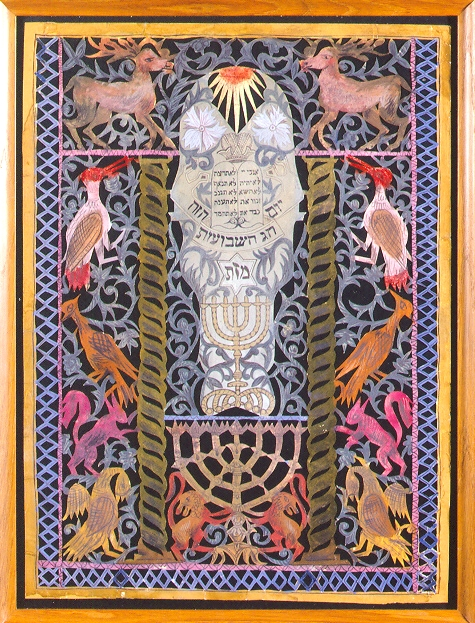
Coloured papercut in mixed technique depicting symbols pertinent to Judaism and nature. The inscription reads: "Yom Chag Ha Shavuot Ha Zeh". In the Jewish Museum of Switzerland's collection.

Shavuot (from Hebrew: שָׁבוּעוֹת, romanized: Šāvūʿōṯ, lit. 'Weeks'), Shavuos or Shvues (in some Ashkenazi usage), is a Jewish holiday, one of the biblically ordained Three Pilgrimage Festivals. It occurs on the sixth day of the Hebrew month of Sivan; in the 21st century, it may fall anywhere between May 15 and June 14 on the Gregorian calendar.

Shavuot marked the wheat harvest in the Land of Israel in the Hebrew Bible according to Exodus 34:22. Rabbinic tradition teaches that the date also marks the revelation of the Ten Commandments to Moses and the Israelites at Mount Sinai, which, according to the tradition of Orthodox Judaism, occurred at this date in 1312 or 1313 BCE.

The word Shavuot means 'weeks' in Hebrew and marks the conclusion of the Counting of the Omer. Its date is directly linked to that of Passover; the Torah mandates the seven-week Counting of the Omer, beginning on the second day of Passover, to be immediately followed by Shavuot. This counting of days and weeks is understood to express anticipation and desire for the giving of the Torah. On Passover, the people of Israel were freed from their enslavement to Pharaoh; on Shavuot, they were given the Torah and became a nation committed to serving God.

While Shavuot is sometimes referred to as Pentecost (in Koine Greek: Πεντηκοστή, romanized: Pentecostē, lit. 'Fiftieth') due to its timing fifty days after the first day of Passover, it is not the same celebration as the Christian Pentecost or Whitsun, which comes fifty days after Easter. (Note: The Christian observance of Pentecost is a different holiday, but was based on a New Testament event that happened around the gathering of Jesus's followers on this Jewish holiday (Acts of the Apostles 2:1 and following).) That said, the two festivals are related, as the first Day of Pentecost, related in the Acts of the Apostles, is said to have happened on Shavuot.

Shavuot is traditionally celebrated in Israel for one day, where it is a public holiday, and for two days in the diaspora.

== Names ==
=== Biblical names ===
In the Bible, Shavuot is called the "Festival of Weeks" (Hebrew: חג השבועות, romanized: Ḥāġ hašŠāvuʻoṯ, Exodus 34:22, Deuteronomy 16:10); "Festival of Reaping" (Hebrew: חג הקציר, romanized: Ḥāġ HaqQāṣir Exodus 23:16), and "Day of the First Fruits" (Hebrew: יום הבכורים, romanized: Yom habBikkurim, Numbers 28:26). Shavuot, the plural of a word meaning "week" or "seven", alludes to the fact that this festival happens exactly seven weeks (i.e. "a week of weeks") after Passover.

=== Later names ===
The Talmud refers to Shavuot as ʻAṣeret (Hebrew: עצרת, romanized: ʻăṣereṯ, lit. 'refraining, holding back') according to Pesachim 68b, referring to the prohibition against work on this holiday and also to the conclusion of the Passover holiday season. The other reason given is that just as Shmini ʿAṣeret brings Sukkot to a close, ʿAṣeret brings Passover to a close.

Since Shavuot occurs fifty days after Passover, Hellenistic Jews referred to it by the Koine name "Pentecost".

== Significance ==
=== Agricultural ===
The Feast of Shavuot is textually connected in the Bible with the season of the grain harvest, specifically of the wheat, in the Land of Israel. In ancient times, the grain harvest lasted seven weeks and was a season of gladness (Jer. 5:24, Deut. 16:9–11, Isa. 9:2). It began with harvesting the barley during Passover and ended with harvesting the wheat at Shavuot. Shavuot was thus the concluding festival of the grain harvest, just as the eighth day of Sukkot was the concluding festival of the fruit harvest. During the existence of the Temple in Jerusalem, an offering of two loaves of bread from the wheat harvest was made on Shavuot according to the commandment in Lev. 23:17.

The penultimate Dead Sea text to be published has been discovered to contain two festival dates observed by the sect at Qumran as part of their formally perfect 364-day calendar. It was dedicated to New Wine and New Oil, which are not mentioned in the Hebrew Bible but were known from another Qumran manuscript, the Temple Scroll. These festivals "constituted an extension of the festival of Shavuot ... which celebrates the New Wheat." All three festivals are calculated starting from the first Sabbath following Passover by repeatedly adding exactly fifty days each time: first came New Wheat (Shavuot), then New Wine, and then New Oil. (See also below, at "The Book of Jubilees and the Essenes".)

=== Giving of the Torah ===
Shavuot is not explicitly named in the Bible as the day on which the Torah was revealed by God to the Israelite nation at Mount Sinai, although this is commonly considered to be its main significance. It is therefore customary to hear the Ten Commandments being read from a Torah on the first day of Shavuot.

Unlike other major holidays, the Torah does not specify the date of Shavuot, but only that it falls 50 days after Passover, placing it at the 6th of Sivan according to the current fixed calendar (in earlier times when months were fixed by lunar observation, the date could vary by a day or two). The Torah states that the Israelites reached Sinai on the first day of the third month following the Exodus, i.e. Sivan. Then several events occurred, taking a total of at least three days, before the Torah was given. Thus, it is plausible that the giving of the Torah occurred on or about Shavuot, but no exact date is mentioned.

Besides the timing, scholars have pointed to thematic connections between Shavuot and the giving of the Torah, which are indicated by the Bible itself:

- Several aspects of the Shavuot Temple sacrifice (shtei halechem) suggest a connection to the Exodus and the giving of the Torah. The shtei halechem is the only holiday sacrifice which includes a communal shelamim ("peace") offering, recalling the communal shelamim offering which was offered after the acceptance of the Torah (Exodus 24:5–11). Also, the shtei halechem is one of the few sacrifices to include chametz, suggesting that Shavuot is a counterpoint to Passover and its historical events.
- From an early period, Shavuot was regarded as an appropriate time to make covenants between God and humanity. Asa chose to make his covenant (2 Chronicles 15:8–15) on or about Shavuot. (Similarly, according to Book of Jubilees, Noah made his covenant with God on Shavuot.) The association between Shavuot and covenants suggests a connection to the giving of the Torah, which itself was a covenant between God and Israel. In addition, the description of Asa's covenant repeatedly alludes both to the giving of the Torah and to the Shavuot holiday,{efn|The description of this covenant follows the same literary structure which Chronicles typically uses for pilgrimage holidays such as Shavuot, and repeatedly uses the words sheva and shevuah which recall Shavuot. suggesting a link between the two.

Most of the Talmudic sages agreed that the Torah was given on the 6 Sivan (the date of Shavuot), but Jose ben Halafta holds that it was given on 7 Sivan. According to the classical timeline, the Israelites arrived at the wilderness of Sinai on the new moon (Exodus 19:1) and the Ten Commandments were given on the following Shabbat (i.e., Saturday). The question of whether the new moon fell on Sunday or Monday is undecided. In practice, Shavuot is observed on 6 Sivan in Israel and a second day is added in the Jewish diaspora (in keeping with a separate rabbinical ruling that applies to all biblical holidays, called Yom tov sheni shel galuyot, Second-Day Yom Tov in the diaspora). Thus, according to Jose ben Halafta, only outside Israel does Shavuot fall out on the day the Torah was given.

== Ancient observances ==
=== Pilgrimage ===
Shavuot was one of the Three Pilgrimage Festivals on which Jews would visit the Temple in Jerusalem.

=== Bikkurim ===
Shavuot was also the first day on which individuals could bring the bikkurim or "First Fruits" to the Temple in Jerusalem. Bikkurim were so crucial to Shavuot that the Torah twice describes the holiday as a day of bikkurim: wheat was ready for harvest, summer fruits were beginning to ripen, and bikkurim were brought.

=== Shtei Halechem ===
The Torah prescribes a unique sacrifice for Shavuot: the shtei halechem or 'Two Loaves', which—atypically for sacrifices—must be chametz and are described as bikkurim of the wheat harvest. These loaves are accompanied by a set of other sacrifices.

According to Judah Loew ben Bezalel, there is a symbolic contrast between the omer offering of Passover and the Two Loaves. The former consists of barley, which is typically an animal food, and represents the low spiritual level of the Israelites immediately upon leaving Egypt during the Exodus; while the latter consists of wheat and represents the high spiritual level of the Israelites upon receiving the Torah.

== Modern religious observances ==
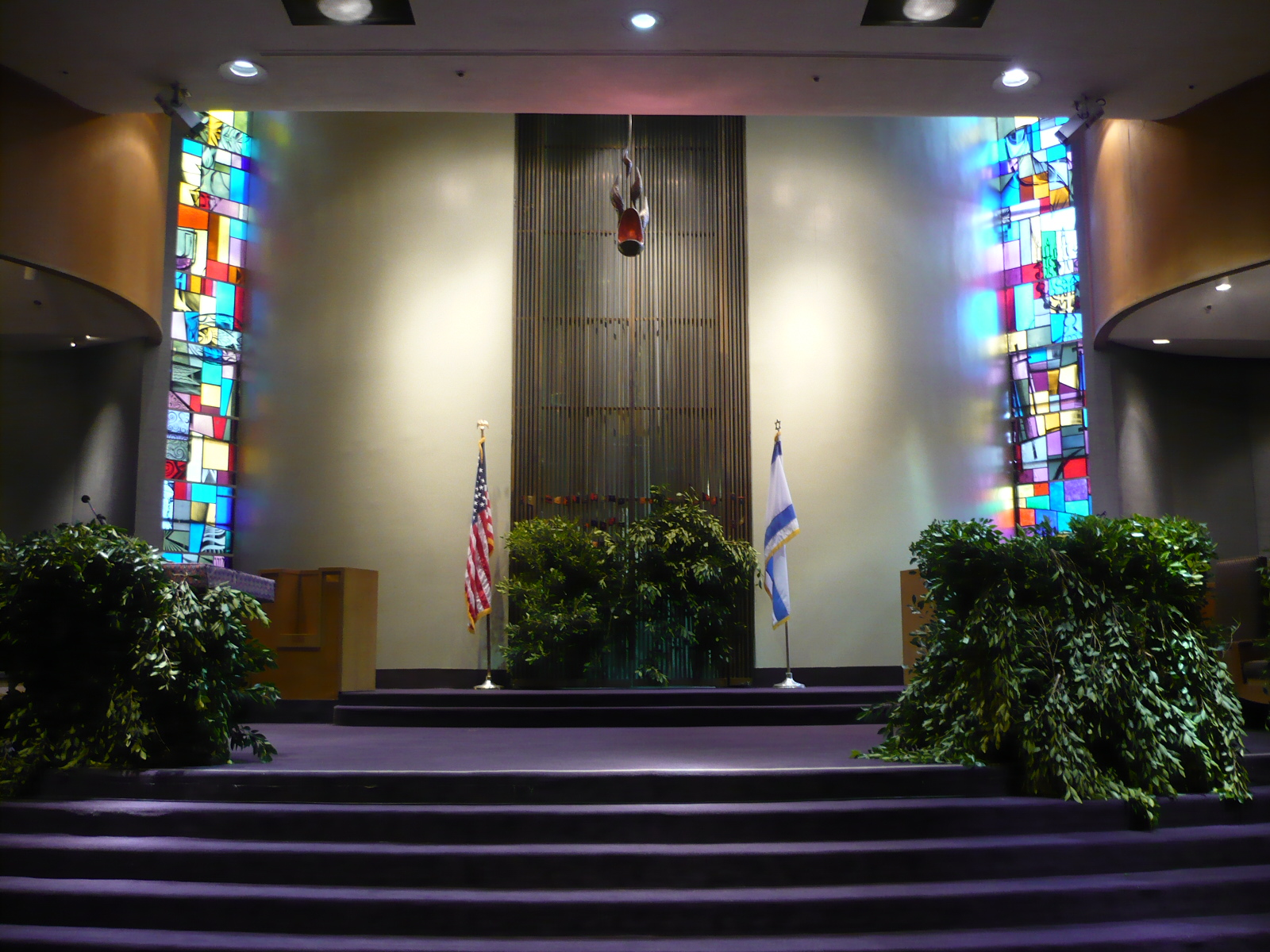
A synagogue sanctuary adorned in greenery in honor of Shavuot

Nowadays in the post-Temple era, Shavuot is the only biblically ordained holiday that has no specific biblical laws attached to it other than usual festival requirements of abstaining from creative work and being in a state of joy. The rabbinic observances for the holiday include reciting additional prayers, making kiddush, and partaking of meals. Special emphasis is placed on hearing the Torah reading on the first day, when the Ten Commandments are read in the Synagogue. There are, however, many customs which are observed on Shavuot. A mnemonic for the customs largely observed in Ashkenazi communities spells the Hebrew word aḥarit (אחרית, "last"):

- אקדמות – Aqdamut, the reading of a piyyut (liturgical poem) during Shavuot morning synagogue services
- חלב – ḥalav (milk), the consumption of dairy products like milk and cheese
- רות – Rut, the reading of the Book of Ruth at morning services (outside Israel: on the second day)
- ירק – Yereq (greening), the decoration of homes and synagogues with greenery
- תורה – Torah, engaging in all-night Torah study.

The yahrzeit of King David is traditionally observed on Shavuot by reciting Psalms and lighting a memorial candle. Hasidic Jews also observe the yahrzeit of the Baal Shem Tov.

=== Torah readings ===
On the first day of Shavuot the story of the giving of the Ten Commandments (Exodus 19:1–20:23) is read in the synagogue. Many people put an emphasis on bringing their children to hear this Torah reading, based on the Midrash which characterizes children as "guarantors" for the continuity of the Torah.

The Haftarah for the first day is the visions of Ezekiel (Ezekiel 1:1–28 and 3:12).

In the diaspora, a section about the three major holidays in Judaism is read (Deuteronomy 15:19–16:17 or 14:22–16:17 on Shabbat) on the second day. For the Haftarah, a section from Habbakuk (Habbakuk 2:20–3:19) is read.

=== Liturgical poems ===
==== Aqdamut ====
The Aqdamut (Imperial Aramaic: אקדמות) is a liturgical poem recited by Ashkenazi Jews extolling the greatness of God, the Torah, and Israel that is read publicly in Ashkenazic synagogues in the middle of – or in some communities right before – the morning Torah reading on the first day of Shavuot. It was composed by Meir of Worms. Meir was forced to defend the Torah and his Jewish faith in a debate with local priests and successfully conveyed his certainty of God's power, His love for the Jewish people, and the excellence of Torah. Afterwards he wrote the Aqdamut, a 90-line poem in Aramaic that stresses these themes. The poem is written in a double acrostic pattern according to the order of the Hebrew alphabet. In addition, each line ends with the syllable ta (תא), the last and first letters of the Hebrew alphabet, alluding to the endlessness of Torah. The traditional melodies that accompanies this poem also conveys a sense of grandeur and triumph.

==== Azharot ====
There is an ancient tradition to recite poems known as Azharot (אזהרות) listing the commandments. This was already considered a well-established custom in the 9th century. These piyyutim were originally recited during the chazzan's repetition of the Mussaf amidah; in some communities they were later moved to a different part of the service.

Some Ashkenazic communities maintain the original practice of reciting the Azharot during mussaf; they recite Ata Hinchalta on the first day and Azharat Reishit on the second, both from the early Geonic period. Italian Jews do the same except that they switch the piyyutim of the two day, and in recent centuries, Ata Hinchalta has been truncated to include only one 22-line poem instead of eight. Many Sephardic Jews recite the Azharot of Solomon ibn Gabirol before the mincha service; in many communities, the positive commandments are recited on the first day and the negative commandments on the second day.

==== Yatziv Pitgam ====
The liturgical poem Yatziv Pitgam (Imperial Aramaic: יציב פתגם) is recited by some synagogues in the diaspora on the second day of Shavuot. The author signs his name at the beginning of the poem's 15 lines – Yaakov ben Meir Levi, better knows as Rabbeinu Tam.

=== Book of Ruth ===
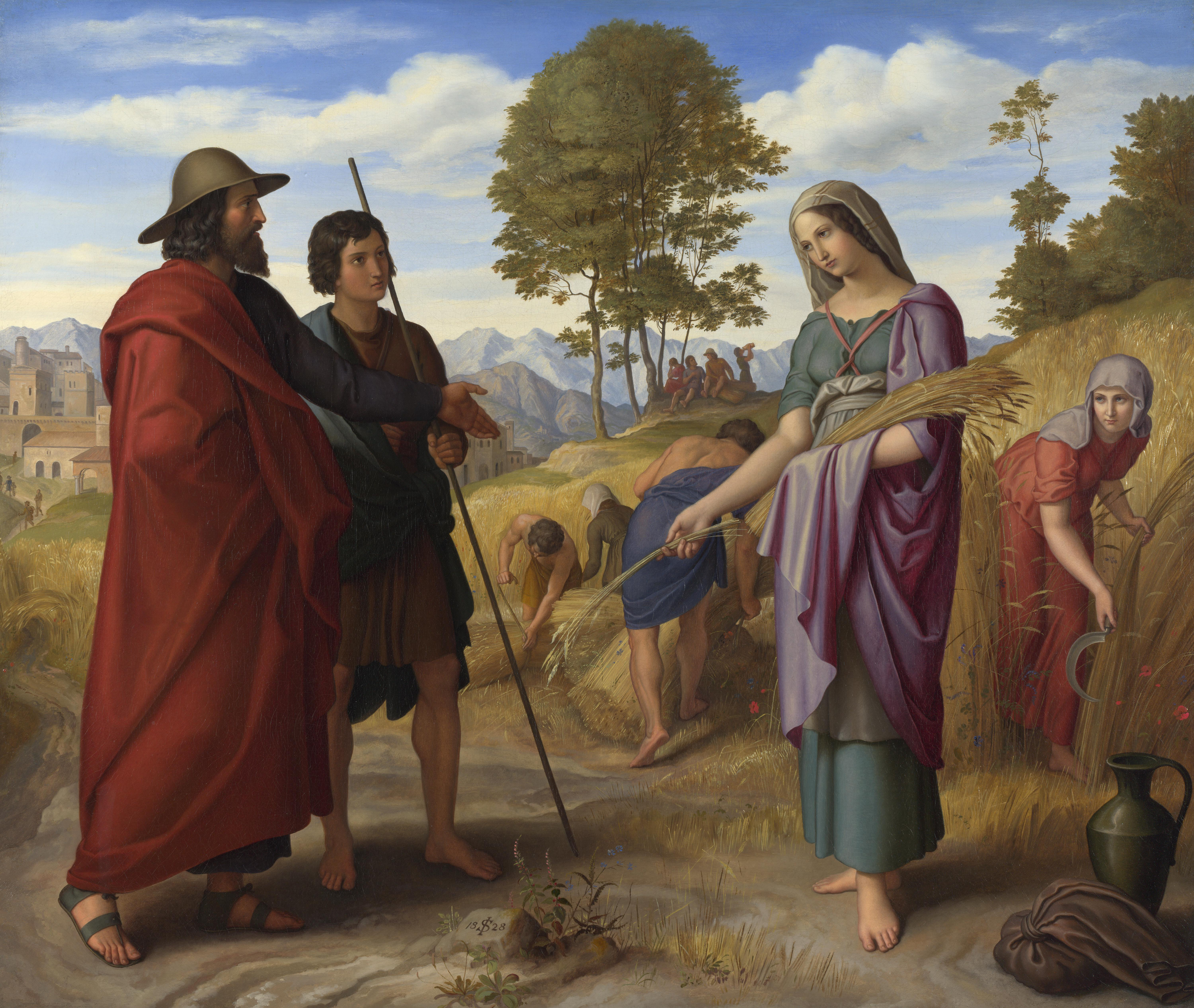
Ruth in Boaz's Field by Julius Schnorr von Carolsfeld, oil on canvas, 1828; National Gallery, London

The Five Megillot – five books from the Hebrew Bible – are traditionally read in synagogue on various Jewish holidays. Of these, the Book of Ruth is read on Shavuot. Reasons given for this custom include:

1. Shavuot is harvest time (Exodus 23:16), and the events of Book of Ruth occur at harvest time.
2. Because Shavuot is traditionally cited as the day of the giving of the Torah, the entry of the entire Jewish people into the covenant of the Torah is a major theme of the day. Ruth's conversion to Judaism, and consequent entry into that covenant, is described in the book. This theme accordingly resonates with other themes of the day.
3. King David (Ruth's descendant, whose genealogy appears at the end of the Book of Ruth) was traditionally born and died on Shavuot.
4. The gematria (numerical value) of Ruth is 606. Added to the Seven Laws of Noah, the total equals the 613 commandments in the Torah.
5. Another central theme of the book is ḥesed (loving-kindness), a major theme of the Torah.

=== Greenery ===
In many Jewish communities, there is a tradition to decorate homes and synagogues with plants, flowers and leafy branches on Shavuot. In fact, Persian Jews referred to the holiday as "The Mo'ed of Flowers" (موعد گل) in Persian, and never as "Shavuot".

A common reason given for this custom is the story that Mount Sinai suddenly blossomed with flowers in anticipation of the giving of the Torah on its summit. This idea is first mentioned in medieval Ashkenazi sources such as Maharil. In another interpretation, flowers represent the Jewish people, which received a covenant with God on this date. Other reasons have been suggested as well.

Some synagogues decorate the bimah with a canopy of flowers and plants so that it resembles a chuppah, as Shavuot is mystically referred to as the day the matchmaker (Moses) brought the bride (the nation of Israel) to the chuppah (Mount Sinai) to marry the bridegroom (God); the ketubah (marriage contract) was the Torah. Some Eastern Sephardi communities read out a ketubah between God and Israel, composed by Israel ben Moses Najara as part of the service. This custom was also adopted by some Hasidic communities, particularly from Hungary.

The Vilna Gaon cancelled the tradition of decorating with trees because it too closely resembles the Christian decorations for their holidays.

=== All-night Torah study ===
Some have the custom to learn Torah all night on the first night of Shavuot, a practice known as Tiqqun Leyl Shavuot (Hebrew: תקון ליל שבועות) ("Rectification for Shavuot Night").

The custom is first recorded c. 1300 in the Or Zarua II. According to that work, "Our righteous forebears, servants of the Most High, would never sleep on Shavuot eve (Note: Compare Zohar, Emor 35: "When a person arrives at [Shavuot] eve, he must learn Torah and join with it . . . the Oral Torah . . . therefore the pietists of old did not sleep on this night, but studied Torah, and they say, 'Let us inherit a holy bequest, us and our children, in both worlds.'" The Zohar was composed in the 1280s, roughly contemporary with the Or Zarua II, which sometimes quotes it in an early form. The Zohar imitates Mishnaic legendary style (E.g. "One may only pray respectfully. The pietists of old would spend an hour preparing their minds to pray . . .") in recommending a new practice, and the Or Zarua II is the first to attest its adoption.)—and now we do this on both nights—for all night they would read the Torah and the Nevi'im and the Ketuvim, and they would skip around the Talmud and the Aggadot, and they would read the secret wisdoms until dawn broke, and they would hold the legacy of their fathers in their very hands". The custom was later linked to a Midrash which relates that the night before the Torah was given, the Israelites retired early to be well-rested for the momentous day ahead. They overslept and Moses had to wake them up because God was already waiting on the mountaintop. To rectify this perceived flaw in the national character, many religious Jews stay up all night to learn Torah.

In 1533 Joseph Caro, author of the Shulchan Arukh, then living in Ottoman Salonika, invited Shlomo Halevi Alkabetz and other Kabbalistic colleagues to hold Shavuot-night study vigils for which they prepared for three days in advance, just as the Israelites had prepared for three days before the giving of the Torah. During one of those study sessions, an angel reportedly appeared and taught them Jewish law.

It has been suggested that the introduction of coffee throughout the Ottoman Empire may have attributed to the "feasibility and popularity" of the practice of all-night Torah study. In contrast, the custom of Yemenite Jews is to ingest the fresh leaves of a stimulant herb called Khat (containing cathinone) for the all-night ritual, an herb commonly used in that region of the world.

Any subject may be studied on Shavuot night, although Talmud, Mishnah, and Torah typically top the list. People may learn alone or with a chavruta (study partner), or attend late-night shiurim (lectures) and study groups. In keeping with the custom of engaging in all-night Torah study, leading 16th-century kabbalist Isaac Luria arranged a recital consisting of excerpts from the beginning and end of each of the 24 books of Tanakh (including the reading in full of several key sections such as the account of the days of creation, the Exodus, the giving of the Ten Commandments and the Shema) and the 63 tractates of Mishnah, followed by the reading of Sefer Yetzirah, the 613 commandments as enumerated by Maimonides, and excerpts from the Zohar, with opening and concluding prayers. The whole reading is divided into thirteen parts, after each of which a Kaddish d-Rabbanan is recited when the Tiqun is studied with a minyan. Today, this service is held in many communities, with the notable exception of Spanish and Portuguese Jews. The service is printed in a book called Tiqun Leyl Shavuot. There exist similar books for the vigils before the seventh day of Pesach and Hosha'ana Rabbah.

In Jerusalem, at the conclusion of the night time study session, tens of thousands of people walk to the Western Wall to pray with sunrise. A week after Israel captured the Old City during the Six-Day War, more than 200,000 Jews streamed to the site on Shavuot, it having been made accessible to Jews for the first time since 1948.

=== Dairy foods ===
Among the customs observed on Shavuot is the consumption of dairy foods, with specific dishes varying among different communities. Dairy foods such as cheesecake, cheese blintzes, and cheese kreplach among Ashkenazi Jews; cheese sambusak, kelsonnes (ravioli filled with tzfatit cheese), and atayef (a cheese-filled pancake) among Sephardic and Syrian Jews; kahee (a dough that is buttered and sugared) among Iraqi Jews; kadeh (a cheese-filled bread) among Kurdish Jews, and a seven-layer cake called siete cielos (seven heavens) among Tunisian and Moroccan Jews are traditionally consumed on the Shavuot holiday. As a dessert, Sephardic Jews traditionally consume sütlaç (a rice pudding cooked in milk) decorated with cinnamon in designs such as the Star of David, flowers, and other patterns. Yemenite Jews do not eat dairy foods on Shavuot.

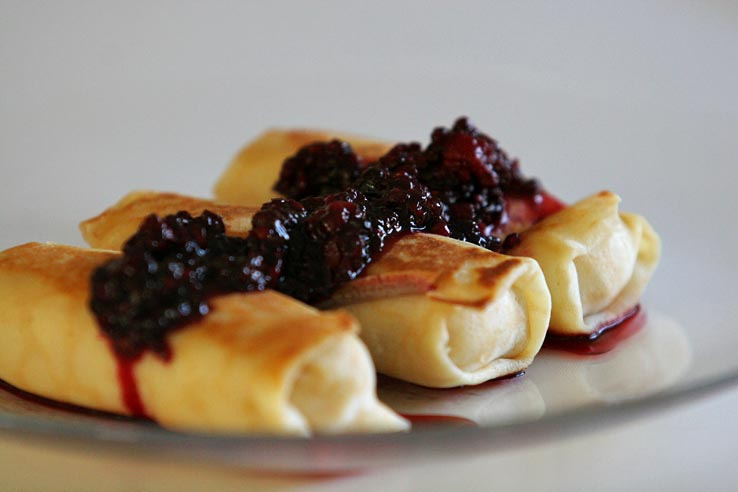
Cheese blintzes, typically eaten by Ashkenazi Jews on Shavuot

In keeping with the observance of other Jewish holidays, there is both a night meal and a day meal on Shavuot. Meat is usually served at night and dairy is served either for the day meal or for a morning kiddush.

Among the explanations given in rabbinic literature for the consumption of dairy foods on this holiday are:

- Before they received the Torah, the Israelites were not obligated to follow its laws, which include shechita (ritual slaughter of animals) and kashrut. Since all their meat pots and dishes now had to be made kosher before use, they opted to eat dairy foods.
- The Torah is compared to milk by King Solomon, who wrote: "Like honey and milk, it lies under your tongue" (Song of Songs 4:11).
- The gematria of the Hebrew word ḥalav (חלב) is 40, corresponding to the forty days and forty nights that Moses spent on Mount Sinai before bringing down the Torah.
- According to the Zohar, each day of the year correlates to one of the Torah's 365 negative commandments. Shavuot corresponds to the commandment "Bring the first fruits of your land to the house of God your Lord; do not cook a kid in its mother's milk" (Exodus 34:26). Since the first day to bring Bikkurim (the first fruits) is Shavuot, the second half of the verse refers to the custom to eat two separate meals – one milk, one meat – on Shavuot.
- Psalms 68:16–17 calls Mount Sinai (Note: Lit. "hill of Bashan". But cf. Rashi and David Qimhi ad loc. and especially Tanhuma ed. Buber, Num. 7:1.) Har Gavnunim (הר גבננים, mountain of majestic peaks), which is possibly related to gevinah (גבינה, cheese). (Note: Menahem b. Saruq, Jonah b. Janah, David Qimhi, Wilhelm Gesenius, and David J. A. Clines do not relate the two words in their lexicons. However BDB lists both under the same root גבנ "rounded" and HALOT is unsure. James Prosser proposed translating גבננים "cheese-like" in his 1838 dictionary. In religious texts this explanation is quoted in the name of Samson Ostropoli, who was apparently also the first to connect it to the Shavuot tradition.)

== Observances in secular agricultural communities ==
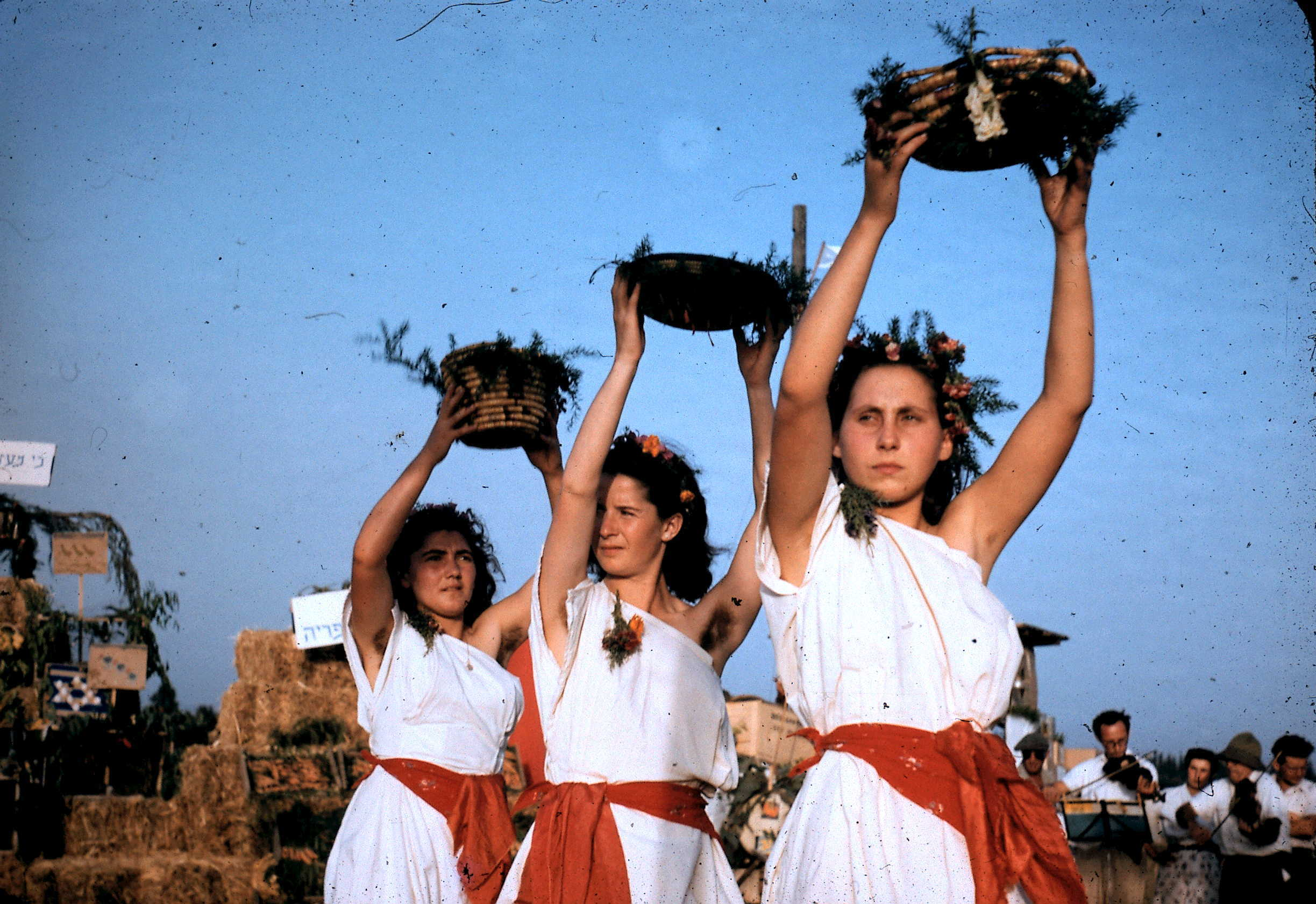
Bikkurim ceremony at Kibbutz Givat Haim, 1951

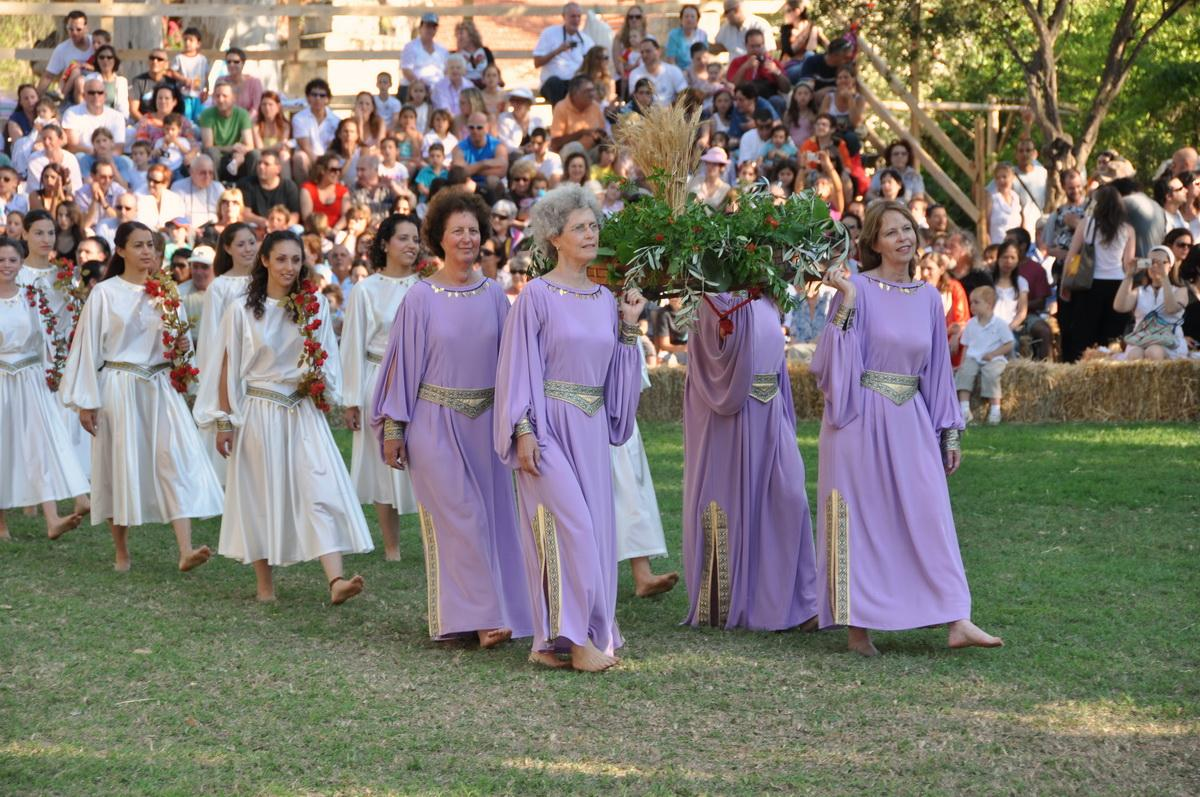
Bikkurim festival in Giv'at Shmuel, Israel, 2009

In secular agricultural communities in Israel, such as most kibbutzim and moshavim, Shavuot is celebrated as a harvest and first-fruit festival including a wider, symbolic meaning of joy over the accomplishments of the year. As such, not just agricultural produce and machinery is presented to the community, but also the babies born during the preceding twelve months.

== Confirmation ceremonies ==
In the 19th century, several Orthodox synagogues in Britain and Australia held confirmation ceremonies for 12-year-old girls on Shavuot, a precursor to the modern bat mitzvah. The early Reform movement made Shavuot into a religious school graduation day. Today, Reform synagogues in North America typically hold confirmation ceremonies on Shavuot for students aged 16 to 18 who are completing their religious studies. The graduating class stands before their synagogue's open Torah ark, recalling the Israelites' experience at Mount Sinai during God's giving of the Torah.

== Date ==
The Torah states that the Omer offering (i.e., the first day of counting the Omer) is the first day of the barley harvest. The omer count should begin "on the morrow after the Shabbat", and continue to be counted for seven weeks.

The Talmudic Sages determined that "Shabbat" here means a day of rest and refers to the first day of Passover. Thus, the counting of the Omer begins on the second day of Passover and continues for the next 49 days, or seven complete weeks, ending on the day before Shavuot. According to this calculation, Shavuot will fall on the day of the week after the first day of Passover (e.g., if Passover starts on a Thursday, Shavuot will begin on a Friday).

=== The Book of Jubilees and the Essenes ===
This literal interpretation of "Shabbat" as the weekly Shabbat was shared by the author of the Book of Jubilees, who was motivated by the priestly sabbatical solar calendar to have festivals and Sabbaths fall on the same day of the week every year. On this calendar, best known from the Book of Luminaries in the Book of Enoch, Shavuot fell on the 15th of Sivan, a Sunday. The date was reckoned fifty days from the first Shabbat after Passover (i.e., from the 25th of Nisan). Thus, Jubilees 1:1 claims that Moses ascended Mount Sinai to receive the Torah "on the sixteenth day of the third month in the first year of the Exodus of the children of Israel from Egypt". In Jubilees 6:15–22 and 44:1–5, the holiday is traced to the appearance of the first rainbow on the 15th of Sivan, the day on which God made his covenant with Noah.

The Qumran community, commonly associated with the Essenes, held in its library several texts mentioning Shavuot, most notably a Hebrew original of the Book of Jubilees, which sought to affix the celebration of Shavuot to 15 Sivan, following their interpretation of Exodus 19:1. (See above at "Agricultural".)

== General and cited sources ==
- Brofsky, David (2013). Hilkhot Moadim: Understanding the Laws of the Festivals. Jerusalem: Koren Publishers. ISBN 9781592643523.
- Kitov, Eliyahu (1978). The Book of Our Heritage: The Jewish Year and Its Days of Significance. Vol. 3: Iyar-Elul. Jerusalem: Feldheim Publishers. ISBN 978-0-87306-151-3.
- Scherman, Nosson, ed. (1993). The Chumash: The Torah: Haftaros and Five Megillos with a Commentary Anthologized from the Rabbinic Writings. ArtScroll/Mesorah Publications. ISBN 978-0-89906-014-9.
