= Omer offering =

Jewish Temple offering performed on Passover

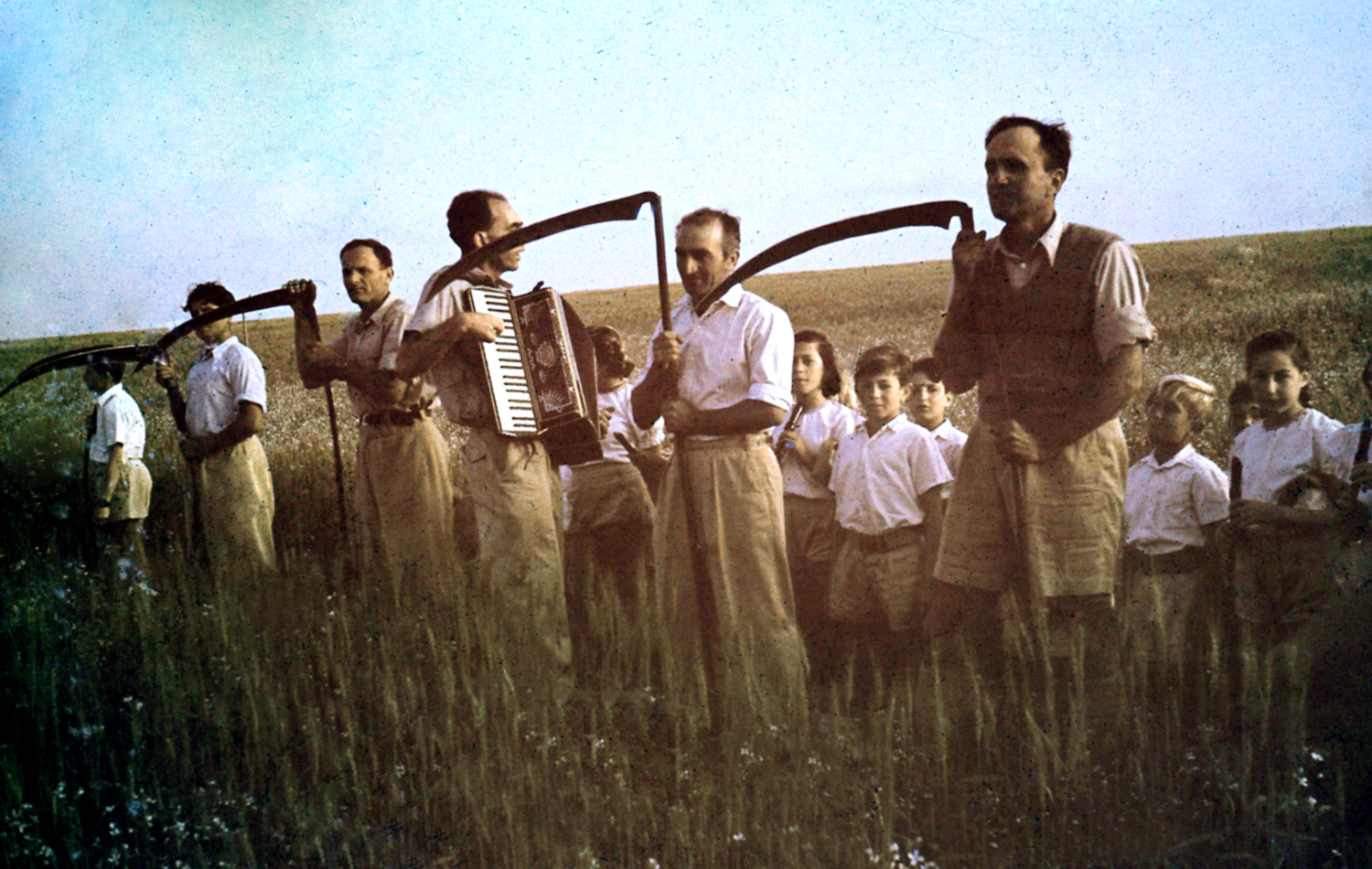
Harvest before the counting of the omer, in 1950.

The omer offering (korban omer), also called the sheaf offering, was an offering (korban) made by the Jewish priests in the Temple in Jerusalem. The offering consisted of one omer of freshly harvested grain, and was waved in the Temple. It was offered on Passover, and signaled the beginning of the 49-day counting of the Omer (which concluded with the Shavuot holiday), as well as permission to consume chadash (grains from the new harvest).

The omer offering was one example of a wave offering (Hebrew: tenufah תנופה), which was waved in the Temple.

== Omer offering ==
Then the Lord spoke to Moses, saying, 10 “Speak to the sons of Israel and say to them, ‘When you enter the land which I am going to give to you and reap its harvest, then you shall bring in the sheaf of the first fruits of your harvest to the priest. 11 He shall wave the sheaf before the Lord for you to be accepted; on the day after the sabbath the priest shall wave it.

— Leviticus 23:9 NASB

The offering containing an omer-measure of barley, described as reishit ketzirchem ("the beginning of your harvest"). Josephus describes the processing of the offering as follows:

After parching and crushing the little sheaf of ears and purifying the barley for grinding, they bring to the altar an issaron for God, and, having flung a handful thereof on the altar, they leave the rest for the use of the priests. Thereafter all are permitted, publicly or individually, to begin harvest.

The leftover of the korban are kept by the kohen and was listed as one of the twenty-four priestly gifts.

The offering was made on "the morrow after the day of rest". This phrase was variously interpreted (see Counting of the Omer): According to rabbinic tradition, the omer offering was offered on the second day of Passover, the 16th day of Nisan. According to Karaite Judaism, it was offered on the Sunday occurring within Passover.

The omer offering was discontinued following the destruction of the Second Temple.

== Counting of the Omer ==
Along with the offering of the omer offering, the counting of the Omer begins. This is a count of 49 days beginning with the omer offering, and concluding with the holiday of Shavuot (which is the 50th day).

For rabbinic Jews, the count is performed at night. For example, the first day of the omer is counted on the second night of Passover (which precedes the second day, as Jewish days begin in the evening).

== Other wave offerings ==
Various other offerings are also described as being waved as part of their ritual. After the ritual, the wave-offering then became the property of the priests.

The noun tenufah (waving) is formed from the verb nuf in the same way as terumah, the heave offering, is formed from rum "heave." In the Septuagint, tenufah was translated aphorisma (ἀφόρισμα).

Both tenufah and terumah are often mentioned together. Both being given to the priests as kohanic gifts.

The Levites themselves were also offered to God by Aaron as a wave offering.
