= Biblical and Talmudic units of measurement =

Units of measurement in Jewish religious texts

Biblical and Talmudic units of measurement were used primarily by ancient Israelites and appear frequently within the Hebrew Bible as well as in later rabbinic writings, such as the Mishnah and Talmud. These units of measurement continue to be used in functions regulating Orthodox Jewish contemporary life, based on halacha. The specificity of some of the units used and which are encompassed under these systems of measurement (whether in linear distance, weight or volume of capacity) have given rise, in some instances, to disputes, owing to the discontinuation of their Hebrew names and their replacement by other names in modern usage.

Note: The listed measurements of this system range from the lowest to highest acceptable halakhic value, in terms of conversion to and from contemporary systems of measurement.

== Unit conversion ==
=== Archaeological ===
While documentation on each unit's relation to another's is plentiful, there is much debate, both within Judaism and in academia, about the exact relationship between measurements in the system and those in other measurement systems. Classical definitions, such as that an etzba was seven barleycorns laid side by side, or that a log was equal to six medium-sized eggs, are also open to debate. Nevertheless, the entire system of measurement bears profound resemblance to the Babylonian and the ancient Egyptian systems, and is currently understood to have likely been derived from some combination of the two. Scholars commonly infer the absolute sizes based on the better-known Babylonian units' relations to their contemporary counterparts.

Ezekiel refers to an "amah (cubit) which is an amah plus a tefah (palm breadth)", and thus is one sixth larger than the standard amah. An explanation for this discrepancy seems to be suggested by the Book of Chronicles, which states that Solomon's Temple was built according to "cubits following the first measure", suggesting that over the course of time the original amah was supplanted by a smaller one. The Egyptians also used two different cubits, one of which—the royal cubit—was a sixth larger than the common cubit; this royal measurement was the earlier of the two in Egyptian use, and the one which the Pyramids of the 3rd and 4th Dynasties seem to be measured in integer multiples of.

The smaller of the Egyptian cubits measured 17.72 in (45 cm), but the standard Babylonian cubit, cast in stone on one of the statues of Gudea, was 49.5 cm (19.49 in), and the larger Egyptian cubit was between 52.5 and 52.8 cm (20.67 and 20.79 in). The Books of Samuel portray the Temple as having a Phoenician architect, and in Phoenicia it was the Babylonian cubit which was used to measure the size of parts of ships. Thus scholars are uncertain whether the standard Biblical cubit would have been 49.5 or 52.5 cm (19.49 or 20.67 in), but are fairly certain that it was one of these two figures. From these figures for the size of a Biblical cubit, that of the basic unit—the finger-breadth (Etzba)—can be calculated to be either 2.1 or 2.2 cm (0.83 or 0.87 in).

=== Halakhic ===
Rabbinic scholars have also attempted to calculate these measurements. The most accepted approaches are those of Rav Avraham Chaim Naeh, who approximates the etzba at 2 cm (0.79 in), and Chazon Ish at 2.38 cm (0.94 in). A third opinion, in Rabbi Chaim P. Benish's "Midos V'Shiurei Torah", provides an alternative understanding of the Rambam and suggests that the etzba, according to the Rambam, is 0.748–0.756 in (1.90–1.92 cm).

In the below tables, the range of values shown is that between the calculations of Naeh and Chazon Ish. The archaeological estimate is in the middle of this range.

== Length and distance ==
The original measures of length were derived from the human body—the finger, hand, arm, span, foot, and pace—but since these measures differ between individuals, they are reduced to a certain standard for general use.

The Hebrew Bible mentions the palm or handbreadth (Hebrew: טפח, romanized: tefakh; plural tefakhim), the span (Hebrew: זרת, romanized: zeret), and the cubit or ell (Hebrew: אמה, romanized: amah; plural amot). In later periods, more measures are recorded: the digit or fingerbreadth (Hebrew: אצבע, romanized: etzba; plural etzba'ot), the mile (Hebrew: מיל, romanized: mil; plural milim), and the parasang (Hebrew: פרסה, romanized: parasa). The latter two are loan words into the Hebrew language, and borrowed measurements - the Latin mille, and Iranian parasang, respectively; both were units of itinerant distance, and thus varied according to terrain and stride length, and, in the case of the parasang, also on the speed of travel.

The measurements were related as follows:

- 1 palm [handbreadth] (tefach) = 4 digits (etzba'ot)
- 1 span (zeret) = 3 palms (tefahim) (Note: According to some sources, a zeret is 2 or 2.5 tefahim instead of 3.)
- 1 cubit [ell] (amah) = 2 spans (zeret), or 6 palms [handbreadths]
- 1 mil (mil) = 2000 cubits [ells] (amot) (Note: However, some modern scholars suggest that a mil equals a Roman mile (1.479 km).)
- 1 parasang (parasa) = 4 mils (milin) (Note: Distance covered by an average man in a day's walk is 10 parsa'ot. Time to walk a parasa is 72–96 minutes.)

Name (plural)	Hebrew name (plural)	Translation	English equivalent	SI equivalent
Etzba (Etzba'ot)	אצבע (אצבעות)	thumb-breadth	0.79–0.94 in	2.0–2.38 cm
Tefach (Tefachim)	טפח (טפחים)	hand-breadth	3.16–3.76 in	8.02–9.55 cm
Zeret (Zarot)	זרת (זרות)	span	9.48–11.28 in	24.08–28.65 cm
Amah (Amot)	אמה (אמות)	cubit	18.96–22.56 in	48.16–57.30 cm
Mil (Milin)	מיל	mile	0.598–0.712 mi	0.963–1.146 km
parasa (parsa'ot)	פרסה	parasang	2.41–2.85 mi	3.87–4.58 km

=== Talmudic additions ===
To the somewhat simple system of distance, the Talmud adds a few more units, namely the double palm (Hebrew: חסיט, romanized: hasit), (Note: According to Nathan ben Abraham's Mishnah commentary, Melo Heseiṭ is the distance between the thumb and index finger when outstretched (little span).) the pace (Hebrew: פסיעה, romanized: pesiah), the cord (Hebrew: חבל, romanized: hebel), the stadion (Hebrew: ריס, romanized: ris), the day's journey (Hebrew: דרך יום, romanized: derekh yom), and an undetermined quantity named the garmida (Hebrew: גרמידא). The stadion appears to have been adopted from Persia, while the double palm seems to have been derived from the Greek dichas. The relationship between four of these additional units and the earlier system is as follows:

- 1 double palm (hasit) = 2 palms (tefah)
- 1 pace (pesiah) = 1 ell (amah)
- 1 stadion (ris) = 1600 palms (2/15 mile) (tefah). (Note: According to Rashi, thirty ris is equivalent to 4 mil. Maimonides concurs, equating 90 ris to 12 mil.) Others say that 1 stadion equalled 470–500 cubits.
- 1 day's journey (derekh yom) = 10 parasangs (parasa)

Two additional units are more ambiguous. The garmida is mentioned repeatedly but without its size being indicated; it is even sometimes treated as an area, and as a volume. The cord is given two different definitions; in the Mishnah it is 50 cubits, but in the Gemara it is only 4 cubits.

== Area ==
The Israelite system of measuring area was fairly informal; the biblical text merely measures areas by describing how much land could be sown with a certain volume measure of seed, for example the amount of land able to be sown with 2 seahs of barley. The closest thing to a formal area unit was the yoke (Hebrew: צמד tsemed) (sometimes translated as acre), which referred to the amount of land that a pair of yoked oxen could plough in a single day; in Mesopotamia the standard estimate for this was 6,480 square cubits, which is roughly equal to a third of an acre.

The following units appear in rabbinic sources:

- Se'arah (Hebrew: שערה, pl. searot), "hair", square 1/36 of a geris
- Adashah (Hebrew: עדשה, pl. adashot), "lentil", 1/9 of a geris
- Geris (Hebrew: גריס, pl. gerisin), hulled fava bean, a circle with a diameter of about 2 centimeters (0.8 in)
- Amah al amah (Hebrew: אמה על אמה), square cubit, 0.232 to 0.328 m^{2} (2.50-3.53 ft^{2})
- Beit rova (Hebrew: בית רובע, pl. batei rova), space of 10.5 cubits x 10.5 cubits for sowing 1/4 kav of seed (1/4 kav containing the volume of 6 eggs). Area varies between 24 and 34.5 m^{2} (258–372 ft^{2})
- Beit seah (Hebrew: בית סאה, pl. batei seah) space for sowing a seah 576 to 829.5 m^{2} (689-992 yd^{2})
- Beit kor (Hebrew: בית כור, pl. batei kor) space for sowing a kor of seed, or what is 30 seah in volume; the area needed is appx. 1.73 to 2.48 hectares (4.27-6.15 acres), or about 23,000 m^{2} in area.

== Volume ==
The Israelite system of powder/liquid volume measurements corresponds exactly with the Babylonian system. Unlike the Egyptian system, which has units for multiples of 1, 10, 20, 40, 80, and 160 of the base unit, the Babylonian system is founded on multiples of 6 and 10, namely units of 1, 12, 24, 60, 72 (60 plus 12), 120, and 720. The basic unit was the mina, which was defined as 1 sixtieth of a maris, which itself was the quantity of water equal in weight to a light royal talent; the maris was thus equal to about 30.3 litres, and hence the mina is equal to about 0.505 litres. In the Israelite system, the term log is used in place of the Babylonian mina but the measurement is otherwise the same.

Although they both use the log as the basic unit, the Israelites differentiated their systems of volume measure between dry and liquid states.

=== Dry measure ===
For dry measurement, or more specifically a measure of capacity rather than of weight, the smallest unit is the beitza (egg), followed by the log (לג), followed by the kab (קב), followed by the se'ah (סאה), followed by the ephah (איפה), followed by the lethek (לתך), and finally by the kor (כור). The lethek is mentioned only once in the Masoretic Text, and the Septuagint translates it by the Greek term nebeloinou (νέβελ οἴνου), meaning wine-skin. These measurements were related as follows:

English name	Hebrew name	Equals	Notes
Kezayit	כזית	1/2 or 1/3 egg, or unrelated to eggs	
Egg	ביצה		
Log	לוג	6 eggs	
Kab	קב	4 log, 24 eggs	
Omer	עמר	1/10 ephah, 43.2 eggs	Also called isaron ("tenth"), asirit ha'efah (tenth of the ephah). Its dry weight was between 1.560 kg to 1.770 kg, the minimal quantity of flour required to separate the dough offering.
Se'ah	סאה	6 kab, 144 eggs	
Ephah	איפה	3 se'ah, 432 eggs	
Letek	לתך	5 ephah	
Kor, Homer	כור	2 letek, 10 eiphah	Boadt notes the word homer (חומר, not be confused with omer) comes from the Hebrew for a donkey, and thus equals "one ass-load."

=== Liquid measure ===
For liquid measure, the main units were the Log, Hin, and Bath, related as follows:

- 1 Log (לֹג) = 4 Revi'ith (רביעית, lit. 'quarter [Log]')
- 1 Hin (הין) = 12 Logs
- 1 Bath (בת) = 6 Hin

The revi'it, or revi'it halog, formed one quarter of a log.

The Bath, equal to 72 Logs, is thus the liquid equivalent of the Ephah, also equal to 72 Logs. The liquid equivalent of the omer, which appears without a special name, only being described as the tenth part of a bath, is as much of an awkward fit as the omer itself, and is only mentioned by Ezekiel and the Priestly Code; scholars attribute the same explanation to it as with the Omer—that it arose as a result of decimalisation.

According to Herbert G. May, chief editor of two classic Bible-related reference books, the bath may be archaeologically determined to have been about 22 liters (5.75 US gal) from a study of jar remains marked 'bath' and 'royal bath' from Tell Beit Mirsim. Based on this, a Revi'ith would measure (approx.) 76 ml or 2.7 fluid oz.

=== Talmudic additions ===
In Talmudic times many more measures of capacity were used, mostly of foreign origin, especially from Persia and Greece, which had both held dominance over Judea by this period. The definitions for many of these are disputed. Those that were certain (disputed) fractions of the Kab include, in increasing order of size, ukla (עוכלא), tuman (תומן), and kapiza (קפיזא). Those that were larger, in increasing order of size, included the modius (מודיא), geriwa (geriwa), garab (גרב). Of unidentified size were the ardaba (אדרב), the kuna (כונא), and the qometz (קמץ); the latter two of these were said to equate to a handful. Some dry measures were used for liquids as well, e.g. se'eh. The kortov (קורטוב) was used for very small amounts (1/64 of a log).

== Mass and money ==
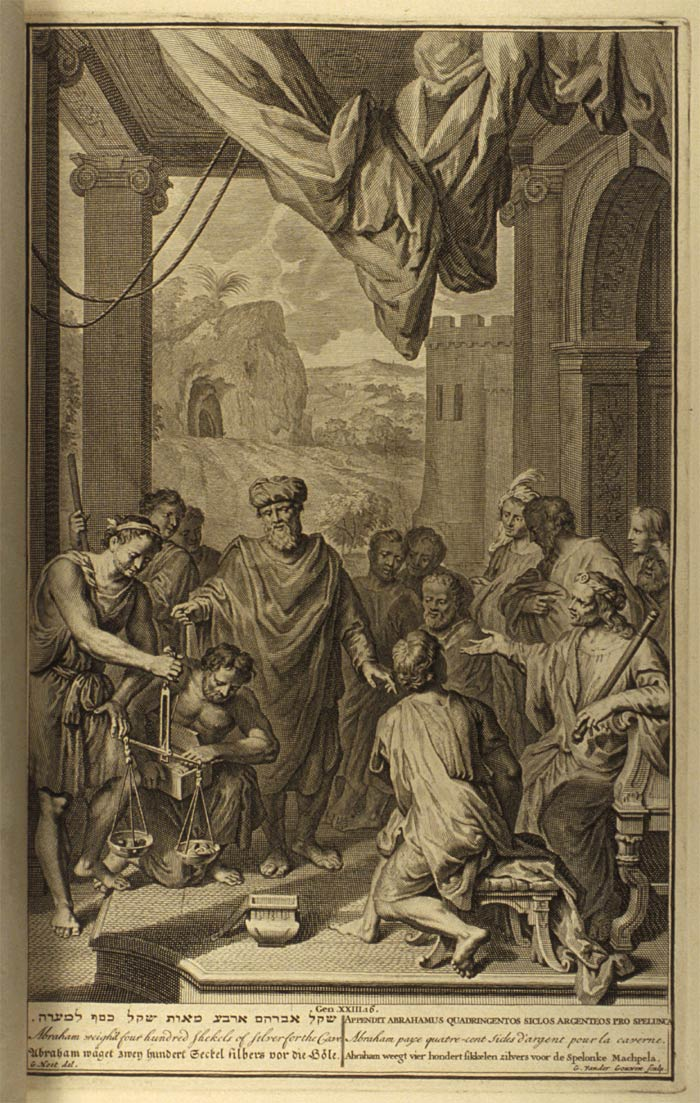
Abraham weighs out 400 shekels of silver (about 4.4 kg, or 141 troy oz) in order to buy land for a cemetery at Machpelah. (1728 illustration, based on Genesis 23)

The Babylonian system, which the Israelites followed, measured weight with units of the kikar (talent), mina, shekel, and giru (Hebrew Gerah), related to one another as follows:

- 1 shekel = 24 gerah
- 1 mina = 60 shekels
- 1 kikar = 60 mina

In the Israelite system, the ratio of the gerah to the shekel was altered to 20:1 (Exodus 30:13). In later generations, the minah was renamed to litra, being the Greek form of the Latin libra, meaning pound. Thus, the Jewish system was as follows:

- 1 shekel = 20 gerah
- 1 litra = 60 shekels (later 100 zuz)
- 1 kikar = 60 litra

There were, however, different versions of the talent/kikkar in use; a royal and a common version. In addition, each of these forms had a heavy and a light version, with the heavy version being exactly twice the weight of the lighter form; the light royal talent was often represented in the form of a duck, while the heavy royal talent often took the form of a lion. The mina for the heavy royal talent weighed 1.01 kilograms (2.23 lbs), while that for the heavy common talent weighed only 984 grams (2.17 lbs); accordingly, the heavy common shekel would be about 15.87 grams (0.56 oz). According to Josephus, it was the heavy common talent, and its mina and shekel, that was the normal measure of weight in Syria and Judea; Josephus also mentions an additional unit – the bekah – which was exactly half a shekel.

Gradually, the system was reformed, perhaps under the influence of Egypt, so that a mina was worth only 50 shekels rather than 60; to achieve this, the shekel remained the same weight, while the weight of the standard mina was reduced. Moses mandated that the standard coinage would be in single shekels of silver; thus each shekel coin would constitute about 15.86 grams (0.51 troy ounces) of pure silver. In Judea, the Biblical shekel was initially worth about 3⅓ denarii, but over time the measurement had enlarged so that it would be worth exactly four denarii.

Name (English)	Name (Hebrew)	Description	Non-Jewish equivalent	Weight	Notes
Prutah (pl. prutot)	פרוטה	Copper coin		22 mg (0.34 troy grains)	
Issar (pl. issarim)		Roman copper coin	As (assarion)	177 mg (2.732 troy grains)	
Pundion (pl. pundionim)	פונדיון	Roman copper coin	Dupondius	349 mg (5.4 troy grains)	
Ma'ah (pl. ma'ot = "money") or gerah	גרה	Silver coin		699 mg (10.8 troy grains)	Lit. grain. Twenty gerah form a shekel.
Dinar (pl. dinarim) or zuz	דינר	Roman silver coin	Denarius	4.26 grams (0.137 ozt)	Called zuz to avoid confusion with the gold dinar (Aureus).
Pim	פים			About 7.6 grams, or 2/3 shekel.	Discovered by archaeologists in the form of the pim weight.
Shekel (pl. shkalim)	שקל	Jewish silver coin		14 g	From 8.39 to 15.86 grams (0.27-0.51 troy ounces) of pure silver (Chazon Ish).
Sela (pl. selo'im)	סלע	Silver coin	tetradrachm	17.1 grams (0.55 ozt)	equals two shekel
Dinar (pl. dinarim or dinarei)	דינר	Roman gold coin	Aureus	7.99 grams (0.257 ozt) of gold (106.25 grams or 3.416 ozt in silver)	Hebrew "Dinerei zahav" (gold dinar)
Minah		Silver coin	Libra	424.87 grams (13.66 ozt)	equivalent with maneh which equals 100 zuz.
Kikar (pl. kikarim)	כיכר	Gold weight	Talent of gold		Equivalent to 3000 shekel

== Time ==
=== Year ===
The Hebrew calendar is a lunar calendar synchronised with the seasons by intercalation, i.e. a lunisolar calendar. There are thus 12 ordinary months plus an extra month that is added in (intercalated) every few years. Some months vary in length by a day, as well.

=== Week ===
The modern Hebrew calendar follows a seven-day weekly cycle, which runs concurrently but independently of the monthly and annual cycles. The seven-day cycle is not seen as a cycle in nature, and is rather a custom biblically originating from Genesis 1:3–2:3 and other biblical references to Shabbat.

=== Day ===
In addition to "tomorrow" (machar) and "yesterday" (etmol), the Israelite vocabulary also contained a distinct word for two days ago (shilshom). Maḥaratayim ("the day after tomorrow", "over-morrow"), is a dual form of machar, literally "two tomorrows". In the Bible, the day is divided up vaguely, with descriptions such as "midnight", "noontime", "eveningtime", and "at the beginning of the middle night watch". Nevertheless, it is clear that the day was considered to start at dusk.

By Talmudic times, the Babylonian system of dividing up the day (from sunset to sunrise, and sunrise to sunset), into hours (Hebrew: שעה, romanized: sha'ah), parts (Hebrew: חלק, romanized: heleq, plural halaqim), and moments (Hebrew: רגע, romanized: rega, plural rega'im), had been adopted; the relationship of these units was:

- 1 part (heleq) = 76 moments (rega'im) (each moment, rega, is 0.04386 of a second; 22.8 rega'im is 1 second)
- 1 hour (sha'ah) = 1080 parts (halaqim) (each heleq is 3⅓ seconds)
- 1 day = 24 hours (sha'ah)

To complicate matters, Halakha, speaking of the relative hour, states that there are always 12 hours between the break of dawn and sunset, so these measurements are averages. For example, in the summer, a day time hour is much longer than a night time hour.
