= Log (unit) =

Unit of volume in the Bible and Jewish law

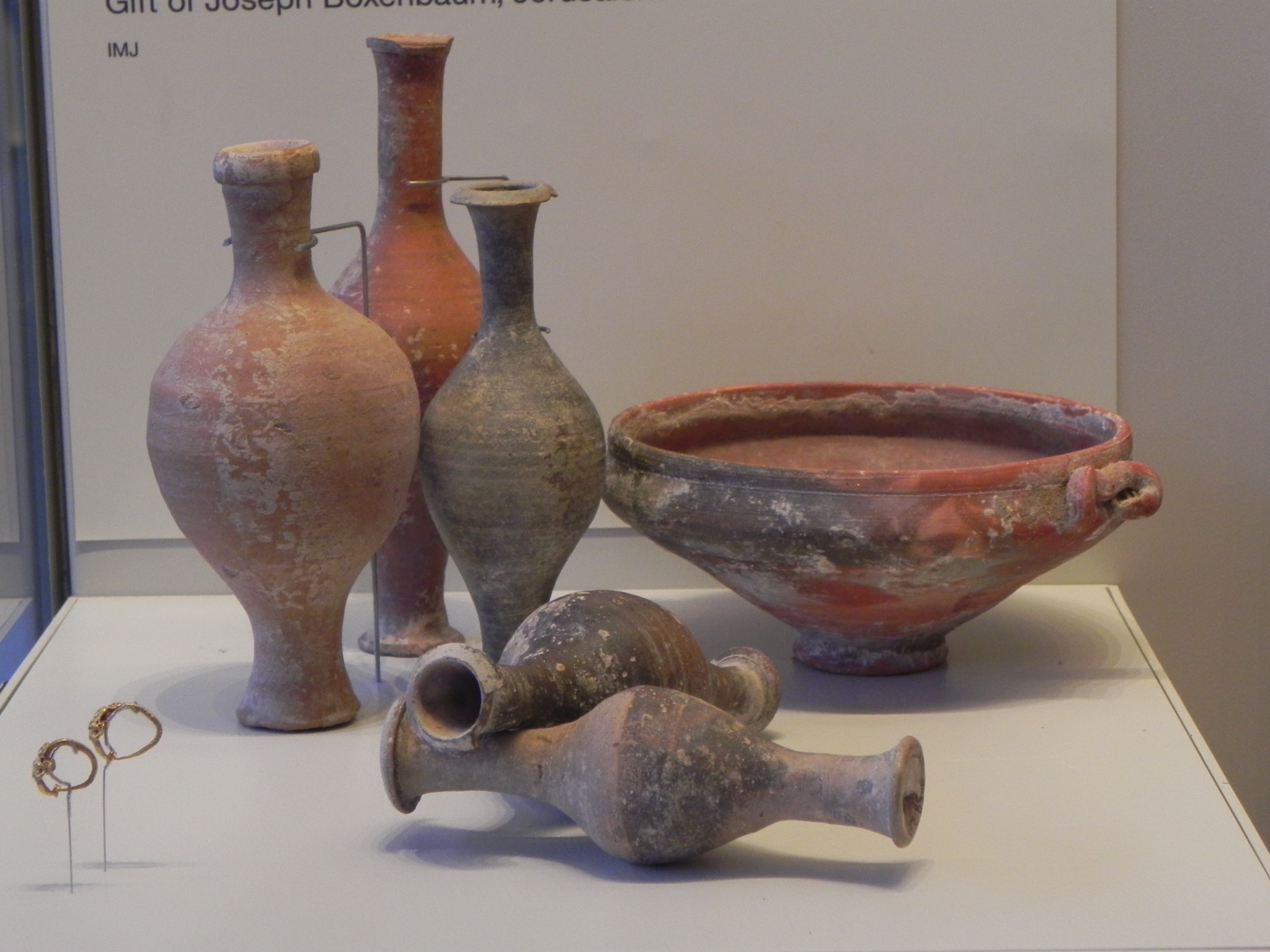
Jars from the Second Temple period (Israel Museum)

A log (Hebrew לוג or וג, Romanized lōḡ) is a biblical and halakhic unit of liquid volume. The word log occurs in the Bible, in Lev. 14:10, 15, 21 which prescribes the korban (asham, "guilt-offering") of a poor metzorah:

ואם דל הוא ואין ידו משגת ולקח כבש אחד אשם לתנופה לכפר עליו ועשרון סלת אחד בלול בשמן למנחה ולג שמן
And if he be poor, and his means suffice not, then he shall take one he-lamb for a guilt-offering to be waved, to make atonement for him, and one tenth part of an ephah of fine flour mingled with oil for a meal-offering, and a log of oil;

== Unit definition, conversion, mnemonics and supports ==
The Talmud, citing the gematria of an extra scriptural word ZeH "this," which equals twelve (seven plus five), explains that one hin is twelve log:

הין תריסר לוגי הויין דכתיב (שמות ל, כד) שמן זית הין וכתיב (שמות ל, לא) שמן משחת קדש יהיה זה לי לדורותיכם זה בגימטריא תריסר הויין:
The Gemara elaborates: Now, one hin is twelve log, as it is written: “And of olive oil a hin” (Exodus 30:24), and it is written afterward in the same verse: “Sacred anointing oil, this [zeh] shall be for Me, throughout your generations.” The numerical value [gematria] of zeh is twelve.

The Mishnah immediately preceding, which this Gemara comes to explain, states that a half-hin is six log. Thus a hin is twelve log.

A list of conversions follows:

- 1 hin (הִין hîn) = 12 logs
- 1 log = 6 Beitzah (egg)

The log is believed to have been equal to a little over 500 ml (17 US fl oz); thus, a hin was a little over 6 L (1.6 US gal).

== See also ==
- Biblical and Talmudic units of measurement
