= Omar, Kunar =

Village in Afghanistan

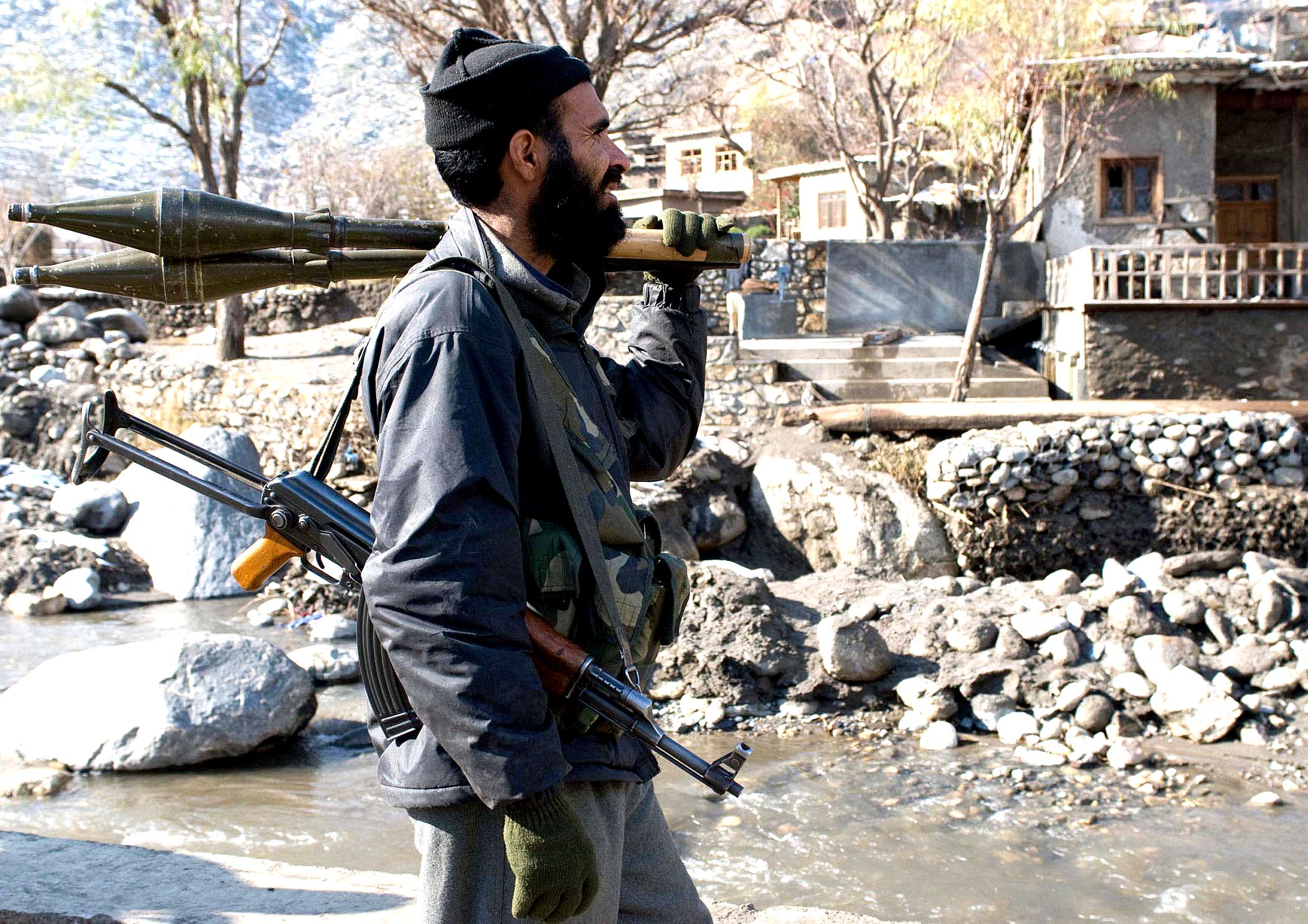
Afghan policeman on patrol in Omar

Omar (Pashto: عمر) is a village near the Pech River valley in Konar Province, Afghanistan.
