= Seah (unit) =

Ancient Jewish unit of volume

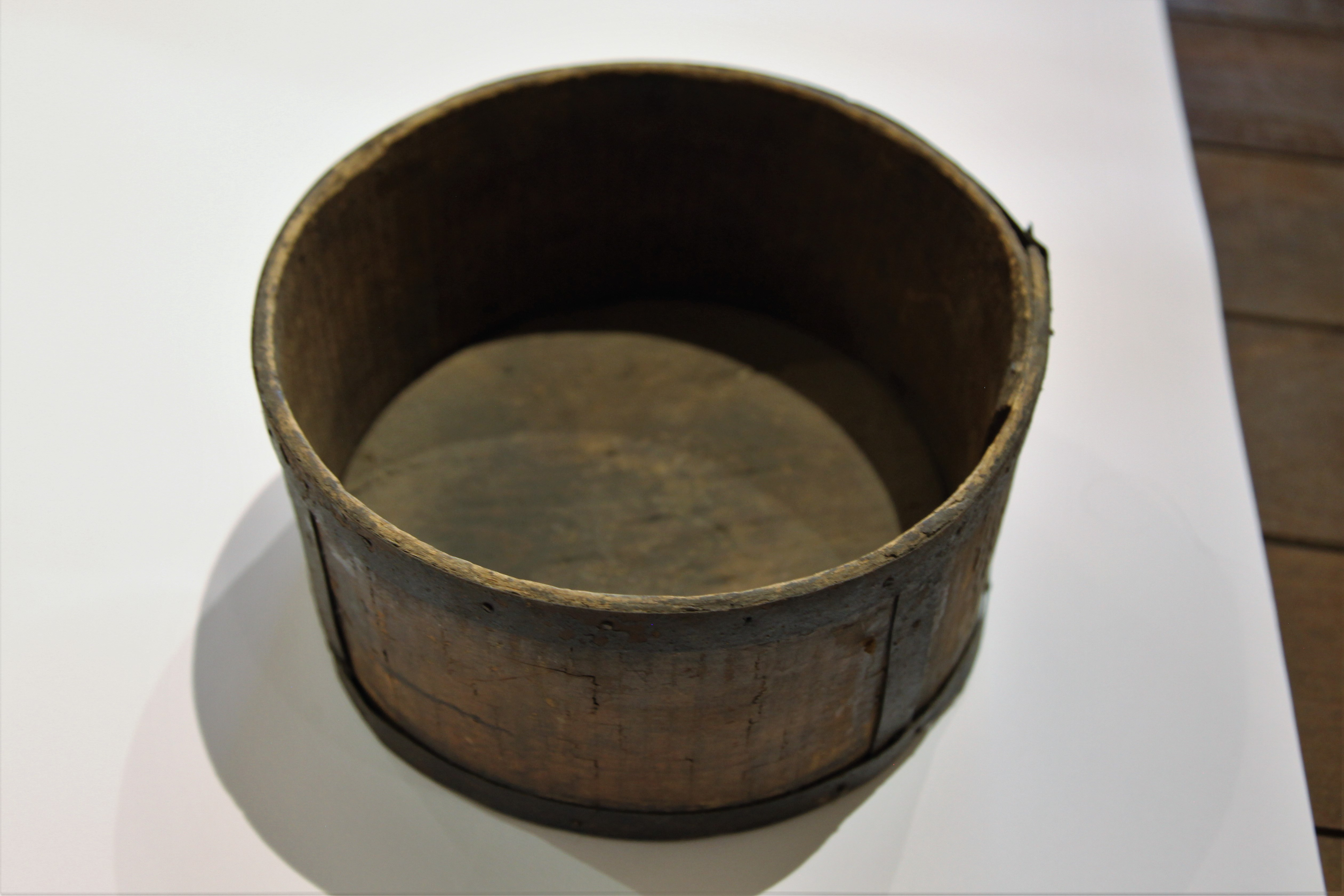
Seah from the Citadel Treasure Museum in Acre, Israel

The se'ah or seah (Hebrew: סאה sə’āh), plural se'im, is a unit of dry measure of ancient origin found in the Bible and in Halakha (Jewish law), which equals one third of an ephah, or bath. In layman's terms, it is equal to the capacity of 144 medium-sized eggs, or what is equal in volume to about 9 US quarts (8.5 litres). Its size in modern units varies widely according to the criteria used for defining it.

== Biblical Seah ==
The seah is first mentioned in Genesis 18:6, where Abraham asks Sarah to prepare three se'im of flour into loaves for his three heavenly visitors:

וימהר אברהם האהלה אל שרה ויאמר מהרי שלש סאים קמח סלת לושי ועשי עגות
And Abraham hastened into the tent unto Sarah, and said: "Make ready quickly three measures (se'im) of fine meal, knead it, and make loaves."

There are several further references to the seah in the Books of Samuel and Kings.

According to Herbert G. May, chief editor of two Bible-related reference books, the bath may be archaeologically determined to have been about 5.75 U.S. gallons (22 liters) from a study of jar remains marked "bath" and "royal bath" from Tell Beit Mirsim. Using the standard of a bath unit, which has been established to be about 22 litres, 1 se'ah would equal about 7.3 litres, or 7.3 dm^{3}.

The Jewish Study Bible estimates the biblical seah at 7.7 liters (2.0 U.S. gal).

In the New Testament, Jesus refers to a woman who takes "three measures of meal", the same quantity, and mixes it with yeast, illustrating his teaching on the kingdom of heaven.

== Seah in Orthodox Judaism ==
In the context of a mikveh, forty se'ahs are the minimum quantity of water needed to render bodily purification after an immersion. A mikveh must, according to the classical regulations, contain enough water to cover the entire body of an average-sized person. Based on a mikveh with the dimensions of 3 cubits deep, 1 cubit wide, and 1 cubit long, these were the minimal measurements needed to reach a volume of water that was estimated at being forty se'ahs of water. The exact volume referred to by a se'ah is debated, and classical rabbinical literature specifies only that it is enough to fit 144 eggs. In some Orthodox Jewish circles there is a proclivity to follow the stringent ruling of Avrohom Yeshaya Karelitz, or Eliyahu of Vilna, whose view is that the size of eggs has progressively become smaller over the ages, therefore requiring a larger measure.

According to this view, one se'ah is 14.3 litres, and therefore an ablution (mikveh) of forty se'ahs (the minimum measure needed to effect ritual purity) must contain at the least 575 litres, by their standard. (Note: About 3 koku, about 116 qafiz, about 126 imperial gallons, about 143 Burmese tins, and about 150 U.S. liquid gallons.)

Those dissenting and who hold the view that eggs today have the same size as the eggs used in measurement by the Sages are Rabbi Yechiel Michel Epstein (1829–1908), author of the Aruch HaShulchan, and Rabbi Shelomo Qorah, the late Chief Rabbi of Bnei Brak, among others, who having tested the trigonometric calculations for the volume of flour needed to separate the dough-portion (= the volume of 43.2 eggs), and which, according to Maimonides, can be measured by filling-up a space 10 fingerbreadths × 10 fingerbreadths square (the finger's breadth being the width of one's thumb, about 2.5 cm), with a depth of 3 fingerbreadths and 1/10 of another fingerbreadth, along with a little more than 1/100 of another fingerbreadth, found that medium-sized eggs of our modern age have not diminished in size.

== See also ==
- Biblical and Talmudic units of measurement
