= Counting of the Omer =

Counting of the days from Passover to Shavuot

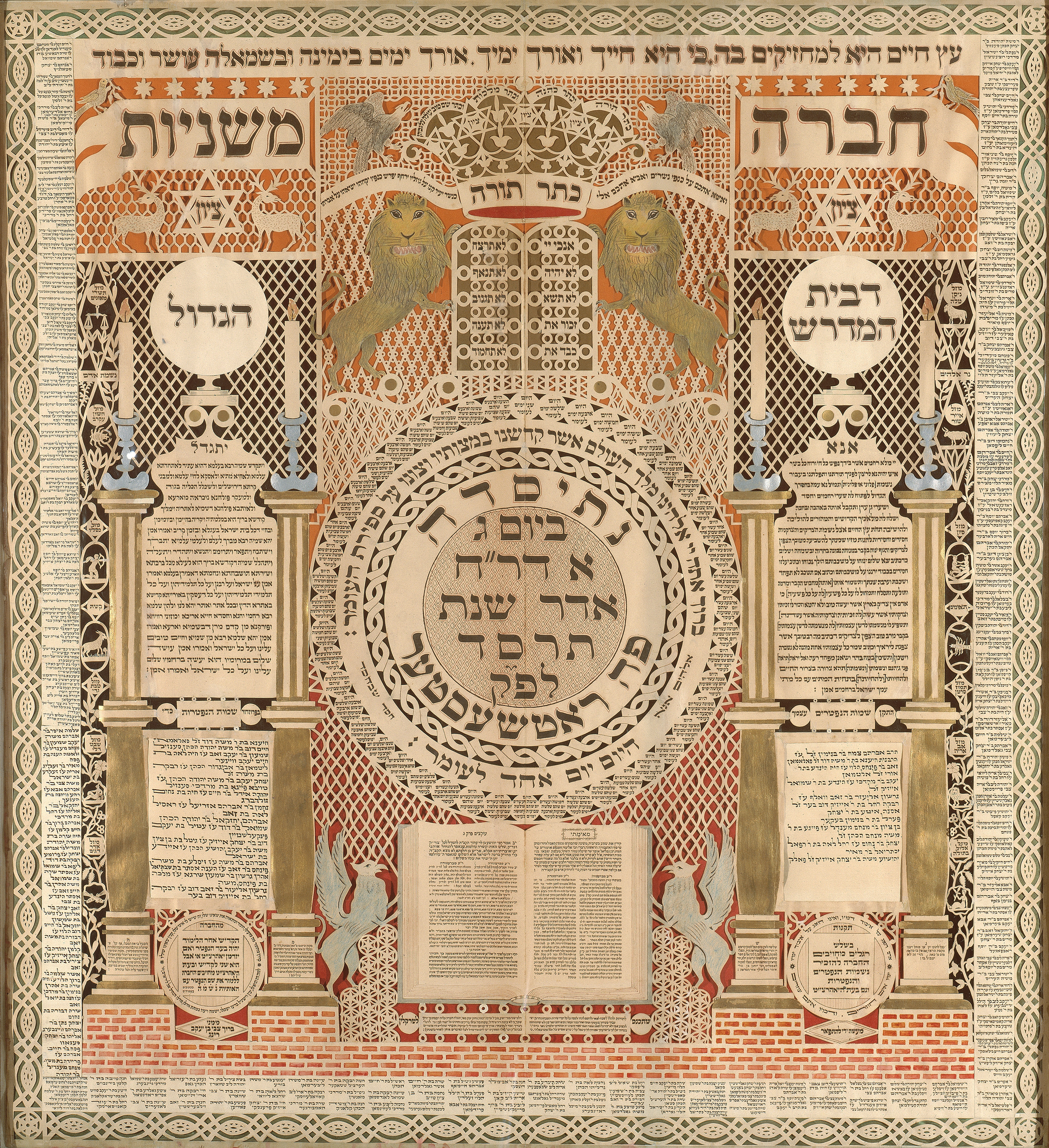
- Omer calendar
- Observed by: Jews and Samaritans
- Type: Jewish and Samaritan, religious
- Begins: 16 Nisan
- Ends: 5 Sivan
- 2025 date: Sunset, 13 April – nightfall, 1 June
- 2026 date: Sunset, 2 April – nightfall, 21 May
- 2027 date: Sunset, 22 April – nightfall, 10 June
- 2028 date: Sunset, 11 April – nightfall, 30 May
- Related to: Passover, Shavuot

Counting of the Omer (Hebrew: סְפִירַת הָעוֹמֶר, romanized: Sefirat HaOmer; sometimes abbreviated as Sefira) is a ritual in Judaism. It consists of a verbal counting of each of the 49 days between the holidays of Passover and Shavuot. The period of 49 days is known as the "omer period" or simply as "the omer" or "sefirah".

The count has its origins in the biblical command of the Omer offering (sheaf-offering), which was offered during the Passover festival, and after which 49 days were counted, and the Shavuot holiday was observed. The Temple sacrifices have not been offered since the destruction of the Temple in Jerusalem, but the counting until Shavuot is still performed. Shavuot is the only major Jewish holiday for which no calendar date is specified in the Torah; rather, its date is determined by the omer count.

The Counting of the Omer begins on the second day of Passover (the 16th of Nisan) for Rabbinic Jews (Orthodox, Conservative, Reform), and on the day after the weekly Shabbat during Passover for Karaite Jews. According to all practices, the 49-day count ends the day before Shavuot, Shavuot thus being the 'fiftieth day' of the count.

The omer ("sheaf") is an old Biblical measure of volume of unthreshed stalks of grain, the amount of grain used for the Temple offering.

== Sources ==
The commandment for counting the Omer is recorded within the Torah in Leviticus 23:9–21:

When ye are come into the land which I give unto you, and shall reap the harvest thereof, then ye shall bring the sheaf (omer) of the first-fruits of your harvest unto the priest. And he shall wave the sheaf before the LORD, to be accepted for you; on the morrow after the day of rest the priest shall wave it. ... And ye shall count unto you from the morrow after the day of rest, from the day that ye brought the sheaf of the waving; seven weeks shall there be complete; even unto the morrow after the seventh week shall ye number fifty days; and ye shall present a new meal-offering unto the LORD. ... And ye shall make proclamation on the selfsame day; there shall be a holy convocation unto you; ye shall do no manner of servile work; it is a statute for ever in all your dwellings throughout your generations.

As well as in Deuteronomy 16:9–12:

Seven weeks shalt thou number unto thee; from the time the sickle is first put to the standing corn shalt thou begin to number seven weeks. And thou shalt keep the feast of weeks unto the LORD thy God...

The obligation in post-Temple destruction times is a matter of dispute, as the Temple offerings which depend on the omer count are no longer offered. While Rambam (Maimonides) suggests that the omer count obligation is still biblical, most other commentaries assume that it is of a rabbinic origin in modern times.

== The count ==
Counting the Omer in Tangier, Morocco, in the 1960s

Counting the Omer, Polish version, recorded in Jerusalem in 1952

As soon as it is definitely night (approximately thirty minutes after sundown), the one who is counting the Omer recites this blessing:

Barukh atah, A-donai E-loheinu, Melekh Ha-ʿolam, asher qid'shanu b'mitzvotav v'tzivanu ʿal S'firat Ha-ʿomer.
Blessed are You, Lord our God, King of the Universe, Who has sanctified us with His commandments and commanded us to count the Omer.

Then he or she states the Omer-count in terms of both total days and weeks and days. For example:

- On the first day: "Today is one day of the omer"
- On the eighth day: "Today is eight days, which is one week and one day of the omer"

The wording of the count differs slightly between customs: the last Hebrew word is either laomer (literally "to the omer") or baomer (literally "in the omer"). Both customs are valid according to halakha.

The count is generally in Hebrew; it may also be counted in any language, but one must understand what one is saying.

The counting is preferably done at night, at the beginning of the Jewish day. If one realizes the next morning or afternoon that they have not yet counted, the count may still be made, but without a blessing. If one forgets to count a day altogether, he or she may continue to count succeeding days, but without a blessing.

== Symbolism ==
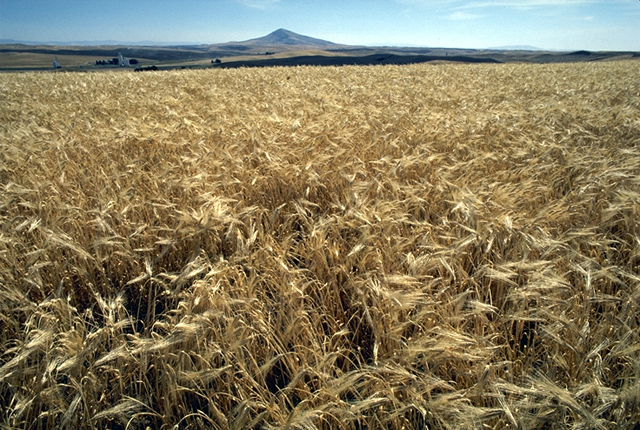
Modern barley field

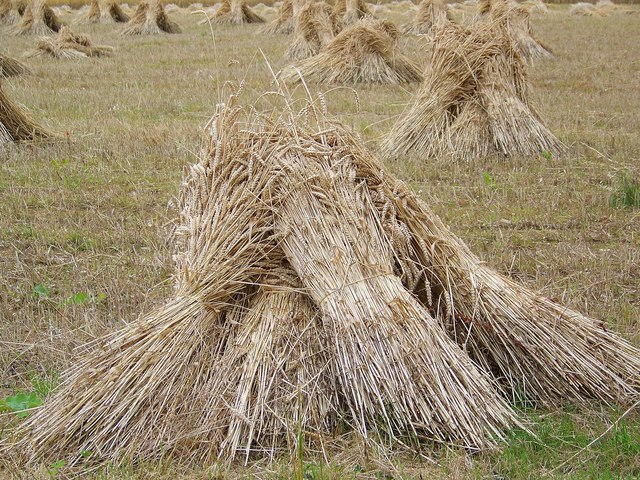
Modern-day wheat sheaves

In the rabbinic chronology, the giving of the Torah at Mount Sinai happened on Shavuot. Thus, the omer period is one of preparation and anticipation for the giving of the Torah. According to Aruch HaShulchan, Moses announced to the Israelites while still in Egypt that they would celebrate a religious ceremony at Mount Sinai once 50 days had passed, and the people were so excited by this that they counted the days until that ceremony took place. Homiletically, in modern times when the Temple sacrifices of Shavuot are not offered, counting the omer still has a purpose as a remembrance of the counting up to Sinai.

One explanation for the Counting of the Omer is that it shows the connection between Passover and Shavuot. The physical freedom that the Hebrews achieved at the Exodus from Egypt was only the beginning of a process that climaxed with the spiritual freedom they gained at the giving of the Torah on Shavuot. The Sefer HaChinuch states that the Israelites were only freed from Egypt at Passover in order to receive the Torah. The Counting of the Omer demonstrates how much a Jew desires to accept the Torah in their own life.

According to Maharal, there is a symbolic contrast between the omer offering (offered on Passover) and the Shavuot sacrifice (shtei halechem) offered upon conclusion of the omer. The former consists of barley, which is typically an animal food, and represents the low and passive spiritual level of the Israelites immediately upon leaving Egypt; while the latter consists of wheat and represents the high and active spiritual level of the Israelites upon receiving the Torah.

In Israel, the omer period coincides with the final ripening period of wheat before it is harvested around Shavuot. In this period, the quality of the harvest is very sensitive, and can easily be ruined by bad weather. Thus, the omer period stresses human vulnerability and dependence on God.

According to Nahmanides, Passover and Shavuot effectively form one extended holiday, with the seven weeks of the omer paralleling the seven days of Passover or Sukkot, and the omer period paralleling Chol Hamoed.

== Karaite and Samaritan practice ==
Karaite Jews and Israelite Samaritans begin counting the Omer on the day after the weekly Sabbath during Passover, rather than on the second day of Passover (the 16th of Nisan).

This is due to differing interpretations of Leviticus 23:15–16, where the Torah says to begin counting from the "morrow after the day of rest". Rabbinic Jews interpret the "day of rest" to be the first day of Passover, while Karaites and Samaritans understand it to be the first weekly Sabbath that falls during Passover. Thus, the Karaite and Samaritan Shavuot is always on a Sunday, although the actual Hebrew date varies (which complements the fact that a specific date is never given for Shavuot in the Torah, the only holiday for which this is the case). Historically, Karaite and Karaite-adjacent religious leaders such as Anan ben David, Benjamin Nahawandi, Muhammad ibn Isma'il, Musa of Tiflis (founder of a 9th-century Jewish movement in Babylon); and Malik al Ramli (founder of a 9th-century Jewish movement in the Land of Israel) concluded that Shavuot should fall out on a Sunday. This is also the opinion of Catholics and the historical Sadducees and Boethusians.

The counting of Karaite and Rabbinic Jews coincides when the first day of Passover is on the Sabbath. Samaritan Judaism has an additional difference: because the date of the Samaritan Passover usually differs from the Jewish one by approximately one lunar month, the Karaite and Samaritan counting rarely coincides, despite each beginning on a Sunday.

Ethiopian Jews traditionally had yet another practice: they interpreted the "day of rest" to be the last day of Passover, rather than being the first day (as in rabbinic tradition) or else the Sabbath (as for Karaites).

== Omer-counters ==
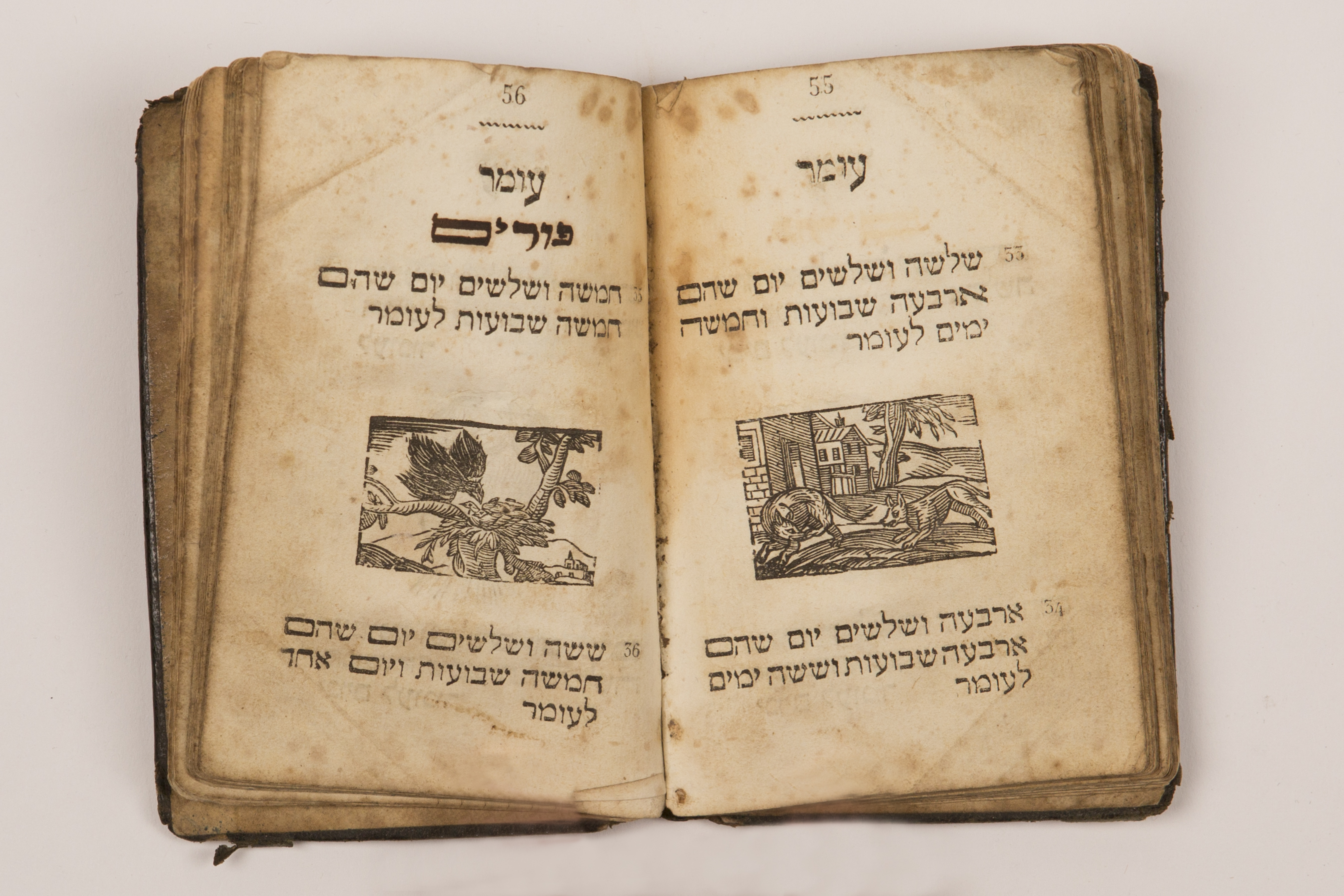
1826 Omer calendar-book from Verona (Italy), in the collection of the Jewish Museum of Switzerland

Omer-counters (לוּחַ סְפִירָת הָעוֹמֶר) are devices which aid in remembering the correct day of the Omer count. They are often on display in synagogues for the benefit of worshippers who count the Omer with the congregation at the conclusion of evening services. Omer-counters come in varying forms, such as:

- Decorative boxes with an interior scroll that shows each day's count through a small opening
- Posters and magnets in which each day's count is recorded on a tear-off piece of paper
- Calendars depicting all seven weeks and 49 days of the Omer, on which a small pointer is advanced from day to day
- Pegboards that keep track of both the day and the week of the Omer.

Reminders to count the Omer are also produced for tablet computers and via SMS for mobile phones.

An Omer counter from the 19th century in Lancaster, Pennsylvania, is preserved at the Herbert D. Katz Center for Advanced Judaic Studies.

== As a period of semi-mourning ==
The omer period has developed into a time of semi-mourning in Jewish custom.

Traditionally, the mourning is in memory of the death of Rabbi Akiva's 24,000 students, as described in the Talmud. (According to the Talmud they died in a "plague" as punishment for not honoring one another properly, but the Sephardic manuscript of Iggeret of Rabbi Sherira Gaon describes them as dying due to "persecution" (shmad), and based on this some modern scholars have suggested that they died in the Bar Kokhba revolt.) Rabbi Yechiel Michel Epstein (author of Aruch HaShulchan) postulates that the mourning period also memorializes Jews who were murdered during the Crusades, pogroms, and blood libels that occurred in Europe. The observance of mourning customs was strengthened after the Rhineland massacres and Cossack riots which occurred in the Omer period. In modern times, the Holocaust is generally included among those events which are memorialized, in particular Yom HaShoah is observed during the Omer.

Mourning practices are observed for only part of the Omer period, with different communities observing different parts. Some families listen to music during the week of Passover and then commence the period of mourning until Lag BaOmer. Some Sephardic Jewish families begin the period of mourning from the first day of the Hebrew month of Iyar and continue for 33 days until the third of Sivan. The custom among Jerusalemites (minhag Yerushalmi) is to follow the mourning practices during the entire Counting of the Omer, save for the day of Lag BaOmer and the last three days of the counting (sheloshet yemei hagbalah) prior to the onset of Shavuot. Many Religious Zionists suspend some or all of the mourning customs on Yom Ha'atzmaut (Israel's Independence Day). The extent of mourning is also based heavily on family custom, and therefore Jews will mourn to different degrees.

Lag BaOmer, the thirty-third day of the Omer, is considered to be the day on which the students stopped dying, so all the rules of mourning are lifted. Some Sephardi Jews, however, continue the mourning period up until the 34th day of the Omer, which is considered by them to be the day of joy and celebration. Spanish and Portuguese Jews do not observe these customs.

During the days of mourning, custom generally forbids haircuts, shaving, listening to live music, or conducting weddings, parties, and dinners with dancing. Some religious Jews shave each Friday afternoon during the mourning period of the Omer in order to be neat in honor of the Shabbat, and some men do so in order to appear neat in their places of employment.

== Lag BaOmer ==
According to some Rishonim, it is the day on which the plague that killed Rabbi Akiva's 24,000 disciples came to an end, and for this reason the mourning period of Sefirat HaOmer concludes on Lag BaOmer in many communities.

According to modern kabbalistic tradition, this day is the Celebration of Simeon ben Yochai and/or the anniversary of his death. According to a late-medieval tradition, Simeon ben Yochai is buried in Meron, and this association has spawned several well-known customs and practices on Lag BaOmer, including the lighting of bonfires and pilgrimages to Meron.

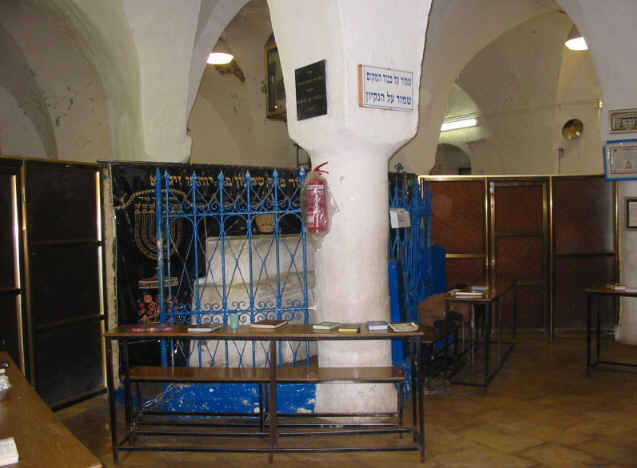
Mark (behind blue fence) over cave in which Rabbi Ele'azar bar Shim'on is buried. This main hall is divided in half in order to separate between men and women.

== Kabbalistic interpretation ==
The period of the counting of the Omer is considered to be a time of potential for inner growth—for a person to work on one's good characteristics (middot) through reflection and development of one aspect each day for the 49 days of the counting.

In Kabbalah, each of the seven weeks of the Omer-counting is associated with one of the seven lower sefirot (Chesed, Gevurah, Tiferet, Netzach, Hod, Yesod, Malkuth). Similarly, each day of each week is associated with one of these same seven sefirot, creating forty-nine permutations. The first day of the Omer is therefore associated with "chesed that is in chesed" (loving kindness within loving kindness), the second day with "gevurah that is in chesed" (might within loving kindness); the first day of the second week is associated with "chesed that is in gevurah" (loving-kindness within might), the second day of the second week with "gevurah that is in gevurah" (might within might), and so on.

Symbolically, each of these 49 permutations represents an aspect of each person's character that can be improved or further developed. Recent books which present these 49 permutations as a daily guide to personal character growth have been published by Rabbi Simon Jacobson and Rabbi Yaacov Haber and David Sedley. The work Counting the Omer: A Kabbalistic Meditation Guide includes meditations, activities and kavvanot (proper mindset) for each of the kabbalistic four worlds for each of the 49 days.

The 49-day period of counting the Omer is also a conducive time to study the teaching of the Mishnah in Pirkei Avot 6:6, which enumerates the "48 ways" by which Torah is acquired. Rabbi Aharon Kotler (1891–1962) explains that the study of each "way" can be done on each of the first forty-eight days of the Omer-counting; on the forty-ninth day, one should review all the "ways."

== See also ==
- Hebrew calendar
