= Dan (volume) =

Chinese unit of volume

A dan or shi (Chinese: 石; pinyin: dàn, shí) in China, koku in Japan and seok (석) in Korea, is a unit of volume mainly for grains. It originated in China and later spread to other places in East Asia. One dan is divided into 10 dous or 100 shengs. It is 100 litres in China, 180.39 litres in Japan and 180 litres in Korea.

== China ==
Table of Chinese volume units effective since 1930
Pinyin	Character	Relative value	Metric value	US value	Imperial value	Notes
cuō	撮	1/1000	1 mL	0.0338 fl oz	0.0352 fl oz	millilitre
sháo	勺	1/100	10 mL	0.3381 fl oz	0.3520 fl oz	centilitre
gě	合	1/10	100 mL	3.381 fl oz	3.520 fl oz	decilitre
shēng	市升	1	1 L	2.113 pt	1.760 pt	litre
dǒu	市斗	10	10 L	21.13 pt 2.64 gal	17.60 pt 2.20 gal	decalitre
dàn	市石	100	100 L	26.41 gal	22.0 gal	hectolitre

== Japan ==
Table of volume units in Japan
Unit		Shō	Metric		US		Imperial	
Romanized	Kanji	Shō	Exact	Approx.	Exact	Approx.	Exact	Approx.
Sai	才	1/1000	2401/1,331,000 L	1.804 mL	37,515,625/15,900,351,812,136 cu yd	29.28 min	240,100/605,084,579 gal	30.47 min
Sai	才	1/1000	2401/1,331,000 L	1.804 mL	37,515,625/15,900,351,812,136 cu yd	0.1101 cu in	240,100/605,084,579 gal	30.47 min
Shaku	勺	1/100	2401/133,100 L	18.04 mL	187,578,125/7,950,175,906,068 cu yd	0.6100 fl oz	2,401,000/605,084,579 gal	0.6349 fl oz
Shaku	勺	1/100	2401/133,100 L	18.04 mL	187,578,125/7,950,175,906,068 cu yd	1.101 cu in	2,401,000/605,084,579 gal	0.6349 fl oz
Gō	合	1/10	2401/13,310 L	180.4 mL	937,890,625/3,975,087,953,034 cu yd	0.3812 pt	24,010,000/605,084,579 gal	0.3174 pt
Gō	合	1/10	2401/13,310 L	180.4 mL	937,890,625/3,975,087,953,034 cu yd	0.3276 dry pt	24,010,000/605,084,579 gal	0.3174 pt
Shō	升	1	2401/1331 L	1.804 L	4,689,453,125/1,987,543,976,517 cu yd	1.906 qt	240,100,000/605,084,579 gal	1.587 qt
Shō	升	1	2401/1331 L	1.804 L	4,689,453,125/1,987,543,976,517 cu yd	1.638 dry qt	240,100,000/605,084,579 gal	1.587 qt
To	斗	10	24,010/1331 L	18.04 L	46,894,531,250/1,987,543,976,517 cu yd	4.765 gal	2,401,000,000/605,084,579 gal	3.968 gal
To	斗	10	24,010/1331 L	18.04 L	46,894,531,250/1,987,543,976,517 cu yd	2.048 pk	2,401,000,000/605,084,579 gal	3.968 gal
Koku	石	100	240,100/1331 L	180.4 L	468,945,312,500/1,987,543,976,517 cu yd	47.65 gal	24,010,000,000/605,084,579 gal	39.680 gal
Koku	石	100	240,100/1331 L	180.4 L	468,945,312,500/1,987,543,976,517 cu yd	5.119 bu	24,010,000,000/605,084,579 gal	39.680 gal
Notes: Approximations are rounded to four significant figures.

== Korea ==
Table of volume units in Korea
Romanization			Korean	English	Equivalents		
RR	MR	Other	Korean	English	Doe	Other countries	Global
Jak	Chak		작(勺)		1/100		18 mL (0.63 imp fl oz; 0.61 US fl oz)
Hop	Hop		홉		1/10	Ge	180 mL (6.3 imp fl oz; 6.1 US fl oz) (Note: The variant figures in Fessley and the UN reports are based on the imperial measuring system.)
Doe	Toe	Doi; Dwe	되	Korean Peck	1		1.8 L (0.40 imp gal; 0.48 US gal) (Note: imp)
Seung	Sŭng		승(升)	Korean Peck	1		1.8 L (0.40 imp gal; 0.48 US gal)
Mal	Mal		말	Korean Bushel	10		18 L (4.0 imp gal; 4.8 US gal) (Note: imp)
Du	Tu		두(斗)	Korean Bushel	10		18 L (4.0 imp gal; 4.8 US gal)
Seom	Sŏm		섬	Korean Picul	100	Picul	180 L (40 imp gal; 48 US gal) (Note: imp)
Seok	Sŏk	Suk	석(石)	Korean Picul	100	Picul	180 L (40 imp gal; 48 US gal)
Jeom	Chŏm		점(苫)	Korean Picul	100	Picul	180 L (40 imp gal; 48 US gal)
Sogok	Sogok		소곡(小斛)		150		270 L (59 imp gal; 71 US gal)
Pyeongseok	P'yŏngsŏk		평석(平石)		150		270 L (59 imp gal; 71 US gal)
Daegok	Taegok		대곡(大斛)		200		360 L (79 imp gal; 95 US gal)
Jeonseok	Chŏnsŏk		전석(全石)		200		360 L (79 imp gal; 95 US gal)

For more details, please see Sheng (volume)

== Words ==
- 擔石／担石 (dàn dàn)
- 以升量石 (yǐ shēng liàng dàn)
- 千石 (qiān dàn)

== See also ==
- Chinese units of measurement
- Japanese units of measurement
- Korean units of measurement
- Dan (weight)
- zh:中國度量衡
