= Sheng (volume) =

Unit of volume

The sheng (Chinese: 升; pinyin: shēng), also known as the Chinese liter, is a traditional unit of volume originating in China. It was later adopted in Japan, where it is known as the sho, in Korea as the seung, and in Vietnam and other East Asian regions. One sheng is equal to 10 ge or 1/10 dou, although its exact capacity has varied across historical periods and regions.

In modern usage, the value of one sheng differs by country: in China, it is defined as exactly 1 litre; in Japan, one sho equals approximately 1.8039 litres; and in Korea, one seung is 1.8 litres.

Historically, the sheng was primarily used as a measure for cereal grains. In contemporary contexts, it is more commonly used, like the litre, to measure liquids or gases.

== Ancient systems ==
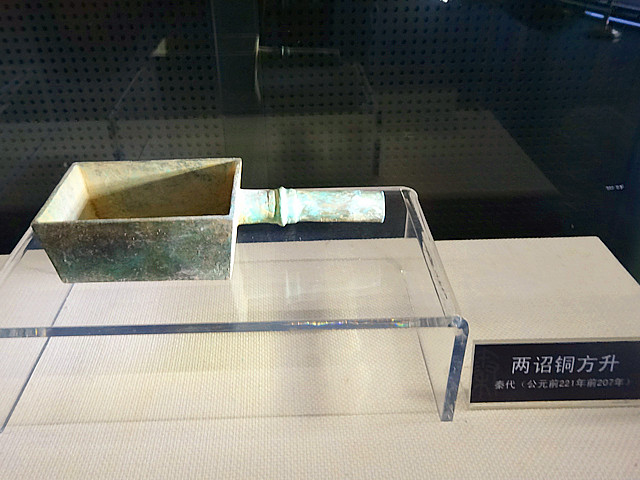
The Liangzhao bronze cubic sheng was a standard measuring instrument issued by the Qin Dynasty. It bears inscriptions of the imperial edicts from the 26th year of the reign of the First Emperor and the first year of Qin Er Shi.

As a unit of volume, the sheng emerged during the Warring States period (c. 475–221 BC) and has been in continuous use since then.

History of volume measurement systems in China
Dynasty	Unit conversion	Metric conversion (milliliters ml)
Warring States Period (戰國)	Qi (齊): 1 zhong (鍾) = 10 fu (釜); 1 fu = 4 qu (區); 1 qu = 4 dou (豆); 1 dou = 4 sheng (升) — Chu (楚): 1 shao (筲) = 5 sheng (升) —	
Qin (秦)	Three Qin (三晉) 1 hu (斛) = 10 dou (斗); 1 dou = 10 sheng (升)	1 hu = 20,000 ml; 1 dou = 2,000 ml; 1 sheng = 200 ml; Shang Yang's Reform (商鞅變法): 1 cubic sheng = 201 ml
Han (漢)	1 hu (斛)=10 dou (斗)；1 斗=10 sheng (升)；1 升=10 ge (合)；1合=2 yue (龠)；1龠=5 cuo (撮)；1撮=4 gui (圭)	1 hu = 20,000 ml; 1 dou = 2,000 ml; 1 sheng = 200 ml; 1 ge = 20 ml; 1 lun = 10 ml; 1 cuo = 2 ml; 1 gui = 0.5 ml
Three Kingdoms (三國) and Jin (兩晉)	1 hu = 10 dou; 1 dou = 10 sheng; 1 sheng = 10 ge	1 hu = 20,450 ml; 1 dou = 2,045 ml; 1 sheng = 204.5 ml; 1 ge = 20.45 ml
Northern and Southern Dynasties (南北朝)	1 hu = 10 dou; 1 dou = 10 sheng; 1 sheng = 10 ge	1 hu = 30,000 ml; 1 dou = 3,000 ml; 1 sheng = 300 ml; 1 ge = 30 ml
Sui (隋)	1 hu = 10 dou; 1 dou = 10 sheng; 1 sheng = 10 ge	Kaihuang (開皇): 1 hu = 60,000 ml; 1 dou = 6,000 ml; 1 sheng = 600 ml; 1 ge = 60 ml Daye (大業): 1 hu = 20,000 ml; 1 dou = 2,000 ml; 1 sheng = 200 ml; 1 ge = 20 ml
Tang (唐)	1 hu = 10 dou; 1 dou = 10 sheng; 1 sheng = 10 ge	Large system (大): 1 hu = 60,000 ml; 1 dou = 6,000 ml; 1 sheng = 600 ml; 1 ge = 60 ml Small system (小): 1 hu = 20,000 ml; 1 dou = 2,000 ml; 1 sheng = 200 ml; 1 ge = 20 ml
Song (宋)	1 dan (石) = 2 hu; 1 hu = 5 dou; 1 dou = 10 sheng; 1 sheng = 10 ge	1 dan = 67,000 ml; 1 hu = 33,500 ml; 1 dou = 6,700 ml; 1 sheng = 670 ml; 1 ge = 67 ml
Yuan (元)	1 dan = 2 hu; 1 hu = 5 dou; 1 dou = 10 sheng; 1 sheng = 10 ge	1 dan = 95,000 ml; 1 hu = 47,500 ml; 1 dou = 9,500 ml; 1 sheng = 950 ml; 1 ge = 95 ml
Ming (明) & Qing (清)	1 dan = 2 hu; 1 hu = 5 dou; 1 dou = 10 sheng; 1 sheng = 10 ge	1 dan = 100,000 ml; 1 hu = 50,000 ml; 1 dou = 10,000 ml; 1 sheng = 1,000 ml; 1 ge = 100 ml

== Modern systems ==
=== China ===
The sheng (升) was established as the base unit in the volume measurement system promulgated by the Chinese government in 1915. At that time, one sheng was defined as 1.0354688 litres.

Table of Chinese volume units effective in 1915
Pinyin	Character	Relative value	Metric value	US value	Imperial value	Notes
sháo	勺	1/100	10.354688 mL	0.3501 fl oz	0.3644 fl oz	
gě	合	1/10	103.54688 mL	3.501 fl oz	3.644 fl oz	
shēng	升	1	1.0354688 L	2.188 pt	1.822 pt	
dǒu	斗	10	10.354688 L	2.735 gal	2.278 gal	
hú	斛	50	51.77344 L	13.68 gal	11.39 gal	
dàn	石	100	103.54688 L	27.35 gal	22.78 gal	

A revised system was introduced in the Weights and Measures Acts of the 18th year of the Republic of China (1929), effective from 1 January 1930. The volume units in use, as listed in the Chinese Name Plan for Unified Metric Units of Measurement (1959), include the dàn, dǒu, shēng, and gě. The basic unit remains the shēng, now defined as exactly 1 litre.

To distinguish between different interpretations of the litre, the traditional Chinese shēng is also known as 市升 (market sheng or market litre), while the modern transliteration of litre is referred to as 公升 (common sheng or common litre).

Table of Chinese volume units effective since 1930
Pinyin	Character	Relative value	Metric value	US value	Imperial value	Notes
cuō	撮	1/1000	1 mL	0.0338 fl oz	0.0352 fl oz	millilitre
sháo	勺	1/100	10 mL	0.3381 fl oz	0.3520 fl oz	centilitre
gě	合	1/10	100 mL	3.381 fl oz	3.520 fl oz	decilitre
shēng	市升	1	1 L	2.113 pt	1.760 pt	litre
dǒu	市斗	10	10 L	21.13 pt 2.64 gal	17.60 pt 2.20 gal	decalitre
dàn	市石	100	100 L	26.41 gal	22.0 gal	hectolitre

Today, similar to the litre, the shēng is most commonly used to measure liquids or gases.

=== Japan ===
In Japan, the base unit of volume is the shō (升), equivalent to the Chinese shēng. One shō is defined as 1.804 litres. Traditional beverages such as sake and shōchū are often sold in 1800 mL bottles known as isshōbin (一升瓶), literally "one shō bottle".

Table of volume units in Japan
Unit		Shō	Metric		US		Imperial	
Romanized	Kanji	Shō	Exact	Approx.	Exact	Approx.	Exact	Approx.
Sai	才	1/1000	2401/1,331,000 L	1.804 mL	37,515,625/15,900,351,812,136 cu yd	29.28 min	240,100/605,084,579 gal	30.47 min
Sai	才	1/1000	2401/1,331,000 L	1.804 mL	37,515,625/15,900,351,812,136 cu yd	0.1101 cu in	240,100/605,084,579 gal	30.47 min
Shaku	勺	1/100	2401/133,100 L	18.04 mL	187,578,125/7,950,175,906,068 cu yd	0.6100 fl oz	2,401,000/605,084,579 gal	0.6349 fl oz
Shaku	勺	1/100	2401/133,100 L	18.04 mL	187,578,125/7,950,175,906,068 cu yd	1.101 cu in	2,401,000/605,084,579 gal	0.6349 fl oz
Gō	合	1/10	2401/13,310 L	180.4 mL	937,890,625/3,975,087,953,034 cu yd	0.3812 pt	24,010,000/605,084,579 gal	0.3174 pt
Gō	合	1/10	2401/13,310 L	180.4 mL	937,890,625/3,975,087,953,034 cu yd	0.3276 dry pt	24,010,000/605,084,579 gal	0.3174 pt
Shō	升	1	2401/1331 L	1.804 L	4,689,453,125/1,987,543,976,517 cu yd	1.906 qt	240,100,000/605,084,579 gal	1.587 qt
Shō	升	1	2401/1331 L	1.804 L	4,689,453,125/1,987,543,976,517 cu yd	1.638 dry qt	240,100,000/605,084,579 gal	1.587 qt
To	斗	10	24,010/1331 L	18.04 L	46,894,531,250/1,987,543,976,517 cu yd	4.765 gal	2,401,000,000/605,084,579 gal	3.968 gal
To	斗	10	24,010/1331 L	18.04 L	46,894,531,250/1,987,543,976,517 cu yd	2.048 pk	2,401,000,000/605,084,579 gal	3.968 gal
Koku	石	100	240,100/1331 L	180.4 L	468,945,312,500/1,987,543,976,517 cu yd	47.65 gal	24,010,000,000/605,084,579 gal	39.680 gal
Koku	石	100	240,100/1331 L	180.4 L	468,945,312,500/1,987,543,976,517 cu yd	5.119 bu	24,010,000,000/605,084,579 gal	39.680 gal
Notes: Approximations are rounded to four significant figures.

=== Korea ===
In Korea, the traditional volume unit is the doi (되), equivalent to the Chinese shēng and the Japanese shō. In Korean, it is also referred to as seung (승, 升).

Table of volume units in Korea
Romanization			Korean	English	Equivalents		
RR	MR	Other	Korean	English	Doe	Other countries	Global
Jak	Chak		작(勺)		1/100		18 mL (0.63 imp fl oz; 0.61 US fl oz)
Hop	Hop		홉		1/10	Ge	180 mL (6.3 imp fl oz; 6.1 US fl oz) (Note: The variant figures in Fessley and the UN reports are based on the imperial measuring system.)
Doe	Toe	Doi; Dwe	되	Korean Peck	1		1.8 L (0.40 imp gal; 0.48 US gal) (Note: imp)
Seung	Sŭng		승(升)	Korean Peck	1		1.8 L (0.40 imp gal; 0.48 US gal)
Mal	Mal		말	Korean Bushel	10		18 L (4.0 imp gal; 4.8 US gal) (Note: imp)
Du	Tu		두(斗)	Korean Bushel	10		18 L (4.0 imp gal; 4.8 US gal)
Seom	Sŏm		섬	Korean Picul	100	Picul	180 L (40 imp gal; 48 US gal) (Note: imp)
Seok	Sŏk	Suk	석(石)	Korean Picul	100	Picul	180 L (40 imp gal; 48 US gal)
Jeom	Chŏm		점(苫)	Korean Picul	100	Picul	180 L (40 imp gal; 48 US gal)
Sogok	Sogok		소곡(小斛)		150		270 L (59 imp gal; 71 US gal)
Pyeongseok	P'yŏngsŏk		평석(平石)		150		270 L (59 imp gal; 71 US gal)
Daegok	Taegok		대곡(大斛)		200		360 L (79 imp gal; 95 US gal)
Jeonseok	Chŏnsŏk		전석(全石)		200		360 L (79 imp gal; 95 US gal)

== Sheng and litre ==
In China, the English unit litre is also referred to as sheng (升). When a distinction is necessary, the word litre is translated as 公升 (gōngshēng, "common sheng" or "common litre"), while the traditional Chinese unit is referred to as 市升 (shìshēng, "market sheng" or "market litre"), as it has historically been more commonly used in commercial contexts.

The different sheng units may also be distinguished by the regions in which they are used or defined, such as the Chinese sheng, Japanese shō, Korean seung, or British litre, among others.

In mainland China, one sheng is equal to one litre. As the two units are identical in size, both are commonly referred to as sheng in Chinese or litre in English, unless clarification is required.

Additionally, standard SI prefixes are applied to the character 升 (shēng) to form other metric volume units. These include:

- 分升 (fēnshēng) – decilitre (dL)
- 厘升 (líshēng) – centilitre (cL)
- 毫升 (háoshēng) – millilitre (mL)

== See also ==
- Chinese units of measurement
- Japanese units of measurement
- Korean units of measurement
- zh:中國度量衡
