= Shao (unit) =

Chinese unit of volume equal to 1/100 litres

A shao (Chinese: 勺; pinyin: sháo) in China, shaku in Japan and jak in Korea, is a unit of volume measurement in East Asia. One shao equals 1/100 sheng. It is 10 mL (millilitres) in China, 18.04 mL in Japan and 18 mL in Korea. Shao' is also a unit of area equal to 0.033 square meters (a hundredth of a tsubo) in Japan and Korea.

The Chinese word shao (勺) means a spoon, or an amount held by a spoon.

== China ==
Volume units effective since 1930 in China
Pinyin	Character	Relative value	Metric value	US value	Imperial value	Notes
cuō	撮	1/1000	1 mL	0.0338 fl oz	0.0352 fl oz	millilitre
sháo	勺	1/100	10 mL	0.3381 fl oz	0.3520 fl oz	centilitre
gě	合	1/10	100 mL	3.381 fl oz	3.520 fl oz	decilitre
shēng	市升	1	1 L	2.113 pt	1.760 pt	litre
dǒu	市斗	10	10 L	21.13 pt 2.64 gal	17.60 pt 2.20 gal	decalitre
dàn	市石	100	100 L	26.41 gal	22.0 gal	hectolitre

== Japan ==
=== Volume ===
Volume units in Japan
Unit		Shō	Metric		US		Imperial	
Romanized	Kanji	Shō	Exact	Approx.	Exact	Approx.	Exact	Approx.
Sai	才	1/1000	2401/1,331,000 L	1.804 mL	37,515,625/15,900,351,812,136 cu yd	29.28 min	240,100/605,084,579 gal	30.47 min
Sai	才	1/1000	2401/1,331,000 L	1.804 mL	37,515,625/15,900,351,812,136 cu yd	0.1101 cu in	240,100/605,084,579 gal	30.47 min
Shaku	勺	1/100	2401/133,100 L	18.04 mL	187,578,125/7,950,175,906,068 cu yd	0.6100 fl oz	2,401,000/605,084,579 gal	0.6349 fl oz
Shaku	勺	1/100	2401/133,100 L	18.04 mL	187,578,125/7,950,175,906,068 cu yd	1.101 cu in	2,401,000/605,084,579 gal	0.6349 fl oz
Gō	合	1/10	2401/13,310 L	180.4 mL	937,890,625/3,975,087,953,034 cu yd	0.3812 pt	24,010,000/605,084,579 gal	0.3174 pt
Gō	合	1/10	2401/13,310 L	180.4 mL	937,890,625/3,975,087,953,034 cu yd	0.3276 dry pt	24,010,000/605,084,579 gal	0.3174 pt
Shō	升	1	2401/1331 L	1.804 L	4,689,453,125/1,987,543,976,517 cu yd	1.906 qt	240,100,000/605,084,579 gal	1.587 qt
Shō	升	1	2401/1331 L	1.804 L	4,689,453,125/1,987,543,976,517 cu yd	1.638 dry qt	240,100,000/605,084,579 gal	1.587 qt
To	斗	10	24,010/1331 L	18.04 L	46,894,531,250/1,987,543,976,517 cu yd	4.765 gal	2,401,000,000/605,084,579 gal	3.968 gal
To	斗	10	24,010/1331 L	18.04 L	46,894,531,250/1,987,543,976,517 cu yd	2.048 pk	2,401,000,000/605,084,579 gal	3.968 gal
Koku	石	100	240,100/1331 L	180.4 L	468,945,312,500/1,987,543,976,517 cu yd	47.65 gal	24,010,000,000/605,084,579 gal	39.680 gal
Koku	石	100	240,100/1331 L	180.4 L	468,945,312,500/1,987,543,976,517 cu yd	5.119 bu	24,010,000,000/605,084,579 gal	39.680 gal
Notes: Approximations are rounded to four significant figures.

=== Area ===
Shao' is also a unit of area equal to 0.033 square meters (a hundredth of a tsubo) in Japan.

Area units in Japan
Unit		Tsubo	Metric		US & Imperial	
Romanized	Kanji	Tsubo	Exact	Approx.	Exact	Approx.
Shaku	勺	1/100	4/121 m^{2}	330.6 cm^{2}	6,250,000/158,080,329 sq yd	51.24 sq in
Gō	合	1/10	40/121 m^{2}	0.3306 m^{2}	62,500,000/158,080,329 sq yd	3.558 sq ft
Jō	畳 or 帖	1/2	200/121 m^{2}	1.653 m^{2}	312,500,000/158,080,329 sq yd	17.79 sq ft
Tsubo	坪	1	400/121 m^{2}	3.306 m^{2}	625,000,000/158,080,329 sq yd	35.58 sq ft
Bu	歩	1	400/121 m^{2}	3.306 m^{2}	625,000,000/158,080,329 sq yd	35.58 sq ft
Se	畝	30	12,000/121 m^{2}	99.17 m^{2}	6,250,000,000/52,693,443 sq yd	1,067 sq ft
Tan	段 or 反	300	120,000/121 m^{2}	991.7 m^{2}	62,500,000,000/52,693,443 sq yd	10,674.6 sq ft
Chō(bu) (Note: Chōbu is used rather than chō when no fraction follows.)	町(歩)	3000	1,200,000/121 m^{2}	0.9917 ha	625,000,000,000/52,693,443 sq yd	2.4505 acres
Notes: Approximations are rounded to four significant figures.

== Korea ==
Volume units in Korea
Romanization			Korean	English	Equivalents		
RR	MR	Other	Korean	English	Doe	Other countries	Global
Jak	Chak		작(勺)		1/100		18 mL (0.63 imp fl oz; 0.61 US fl oz)
Hop	Hop		홉		1/10	Ge	180 mL (6.3 imp fl oz; 6.1 US fl oz) (Note: The variant figures in Fessley and the UN reports are based on the imperial measuring system.)
Doe	Toe	Doi; Dwe	되	Korean Peck	1		1.8 L (0.40 imp gal; 0.48 US gal) (Note: imp)
Seung	Sŭng		승(升)	Korean Peck	1		1.8 L (0.40 imp gal; 0.48 US gal)
Mal	Mal		말	Korean Bushel	10		18 L (4.0 imp gal; 4.8 US gal) (Note: imp)
Du	Tu		두(斗)	Korean Bushel	10		18 L (4.0 imp gal; 4.8 US gal)
Seom	Sŏm		섬	Korean Picul	100	Picul	180 L (40 imp gal; 48 US gal) (Note: imp)
Seok	Sŏk	Suk	석(石)	Korean Picul	100	Picul	180 L (40 imp gal; 48 US gal)
Jeom	Chŏm		점(苫)	Korean Picul	100	Picul	180 L (40 imp gal; 48 US gal)
Sogok	Sogok		소곡(小斛)		150		270 L (59 imp gal; 71 US gal)
Pyeongseok	P'yŏngsŏk		평석(平石)		150		270 L (59 imp gal; 71 US gal)
Daegok	Taegok		대곡(大斛)		200		360 L (79 imp gal; 95 US gal)
Jeonseok	Chŏnsŏk		전석(全石)		200		360 L (79 imp gal; 95 US gal)

The Korean Jak (勺) can also be a unit of area, equaling 0.0330579 m2 (0.355832 sq ft.)

For more details on volume measurement, please see Sheng (volume)

== See also ==
- Chinese units of measurement
- Japanese units of measurement
- Korean units of measurement
- zh:中國度量衡
