= Japanese units of measurement =

Traditional system of measurement used in Japan

Traditional Japanese units of measurement or the shakkanhō (尺貫法) is the traditional system of measurement used by the people of the Japanese archipelago. It is largely based on the Chinese system, which spread to Japan and the rest of the Sinosphere in antiquity. It has remained mostly unaltered since the adoption of the measures of the Tang dynasty in 701. Following the 1868 Meiji Restoration, Imperial Japan adopted the metric system and defined the traditional units in metric terms on the basis of a prototype metre and kilogram. The present values of most Korean and Taiwanese units of measurement derive from these values as well.

In the early 20th century, the traditional system, the metric system, and the Imperial system were all legal in Japan. Although commerce has since been legally restricted to using the metric system, the old system is still used in some instances. The old measures are common in carpentry and agriculture, with tools such as chisels, spatels, saws, and hammers manufactured in sun and bu sizes. Floorspace is expressed in terms of tatami mats, and land is sold on the basis of price in tsubo. Sake is sold in multiples of 1 gō, with the most common bottle sizes being 4 (720 mL) or 10 (1.8 L, isshōbin).

== History ==
Customary Japanese units are a local adaptation of the traditional Chinese system, which was adopted at a very early date. They were imposed and adjusted at various times by local and imperial statutes. The details of the system have varied over time and location in Japan's history.

Japan signed the Treaty of the Metre in 1885, with its terms taking effect in 1886. It received its prototype metre and kilogram from the International Bureau of Weights and Measures in 1890. The next year, a weights and measurements law codified the Japanese system, taking its fundamental units to be the shaku and kan and deriving the others from them. The law codified the values of the traditional and metric units in terms of one another, but retained the traditional units as the formal standard and metric values as secondary.

1891 definitions
Unit		Definition	Conversions		
Romanised	Kanji	Definition	Conversions		
Length		metres	metres	feet	
shaku	尺	10/33	0.303	0.9942	
Area		square metres	square metres	square feet	
tsubo	坪	100/30.25	3.306	35.58	
Volume		litres	litres	US gallons	Imperial gallons
shō	升	2401/1331	1.804	0.4765	0.3968
Mass		kilograms	kilograms	pounds	
kan	貫	15/4	3.750	8.267	
Note: Definitions are exact and conversions are rounded to four significant figures.

In 1909, English units were also made legal within the Empire of Japan. Following World War I, the Ministry of Agriculture and Commerce established a Committee for Weights and Measures and Industrial Standards, part of whose remit was to investigate which of Japan's three legal systems should be adopted. Upon its advice, the Imperial Diet established the metric system as Japan's legal standard, effective 1 July 1924, with use of the other systems permitted as a transitional measure. The government and "leading industries" were to convert within the next decade, with others following in the decade after that. Public education—at the time compulsory through primary school—began to teach the metric system. Governmental agencies and the Japanese Weights and Measures Association undertook a gradual course of education and conversion but opposition became vehemently outspoken in the early 1930s. Nationalists decried the "foreign" system as harmful to Japanese pride, language, and culture, as well as restrictive to international trade. In 1933, the government pushed the deadline for the conversion of the first group of industries to 1939; the rest of the country was given until 1954. Emboldened, the nationalists succeeded in having an Investigating Committee for Weights and Measures Systems established. In 1938, it advised that the government should continue to employ the "Shaku–Kan" system alongside the metric one. The next year, the imperial ordinance concerning the transition to the metric system was formally revised, indefinitely exempting real estate and historical objects and treasures from any need for metric conversion. The deadline for compulsory conversion in all other fields was moved back to 31 December 1958.

Following its defeat in World War II, Japan was occupied by America and saw an expanded use of US customary units. Gasoline was sold by the gallon and cloth by the yard. The Diet revisited the nation's measurements and, with the occupation's approval, promulgated a Measurements Law in June 1951 that reaffirmed its intention to continue Japan's metrication, effective on the first day of 1959. An unofficial and ad hoc Metric System Promotion Committee was established by interested scholars, public servants, and businessmen in August 1955, undertaking a public awareness campaign and seeking to accomplish as much of the conversion ahead of schedule as possible. Its first success was the conversion of candy sales in Tokyo department stores from the momme to the gram in September 1956; others followed, with NHK taking the lead in media use.

With the majority of the public now exposed to it since childhood, the metric system became the sole legal measurement system in most fields of Japanese life on 1 January 1959. Redrafting of laws to use metric equivalents had already been accomplished, but conversion of the land registries required until 31 March 1966 to complete. Industry transitioned gradually at its own expense, with compliance sometimes being nominal, as in the case of 1/4-inch (6.35 mm) screws becoming "1/4 screws". Since the original fines for noncompliance were around $140 and governmental agencies mostly preferred to wait for voluntary conversion, metric use by December 1959 was estimated at only 85%. Since research showed that individual Japanese did not intend to actually use the metric units when given other options, however, sale and verification of devices marked with non-metric units (such as rulers and tape measures noting shaku and sun) were criminalised after 1961.

Some use of the traditional units continues. Homes continue to be reckoned in terms of tsubo, even on the national census as late as 2005, although the practice was discontinued in 2010. English units continue to be employed in aviation, munitions, and various sports, including golf and baseball.

== Length ==
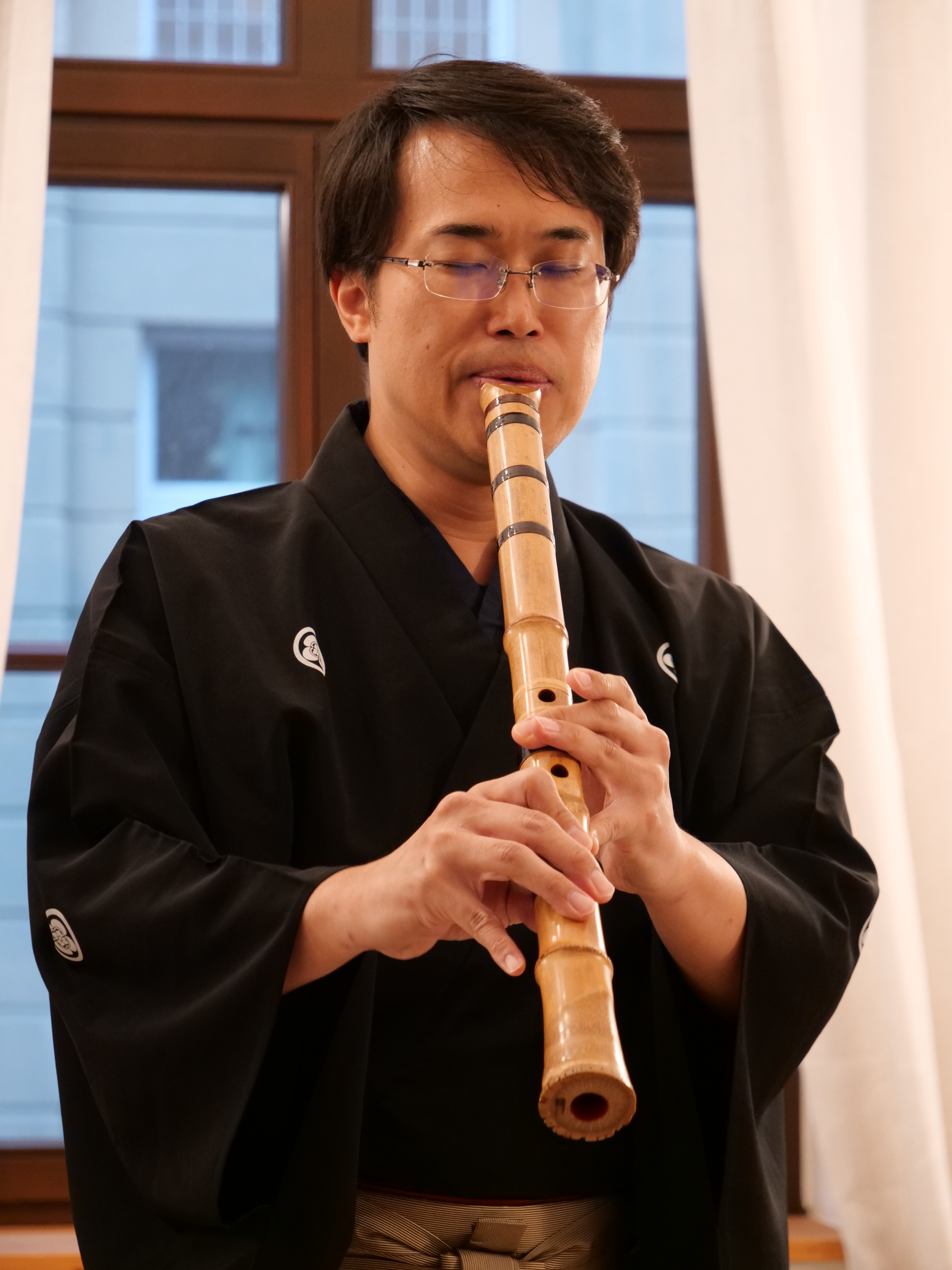
A man playing the shakuhachi flute, named after its traditional length of 1 shaku and 8 sun (54.5 cm)

The base unit of Japanese length is the shaku based upon the Chinese chi, with other units derived from it and changing over time based on its dimensions. The chi was originally a span taken from the end of the thumb to the tip of an outstretched middle finger, but which gradually increased in length to about 1/3 metre (33 cm), just a few centimetres longer than the size of a foot.

As in China and Korea, Japan employed different shaku for different purposes. The "carpentry" shaku (曲尺, kanejaku) was used for construction. It was a little longer in the 19th century prior to its metric redefinition. (Note: In the 10th lunar month of the 3rd year of Meiji (around November 1871), the Railways Ministry defined the "English foot" as 1 shaku 4 rin, making the shaku equivalent to about 0.996 ft.) The "cloth" or "whale" shaku (鯨尺, kujirajaku), named for tailors' and fabric merchants' baleen rulers, was 1/4 longer and used in measuring cloth. (A longer unit of about 25 cloth shaku was the tan.) Traditional Japanese clothing was reckoned using the "traditional clothing" shaku (呉服尺, gofukujaku), about 1/5 longer than the carpentry shaku. The Shōsōin in Nara has ivory 1-shaku rulers, the kōgebachiru-no-shaku (紅牙撥鏤尺).

The Japanese ri is now much longer than the Chinese or Korean li, comprising 36 chō, 2160 ken, or 12,960 shaku. A still longer unit was formerly standard in Ise on Honshu and throughout the 9 provinces of Kyushu, which comprised 50 chō, 3000 ken, or 18,000 shaku. The imperial nautical mile of 6080 feet (1853.19 m) was also formerly used by the Japanese in maritime contexts as a "marine ri". A fourth and shorter ri of about 600 m is still evident in some beach names. The "99-Ri" beach at Kujukuri is about 60 km. The "7-Ri" beach at Shichiri is 4.2 km long.

Table of Lengths
Unit		Shaku	Metric		US & Imperial	
Romanised	Kanji	Shaku	Exact	Approx.	Exact	Approx.
Mō	毛 or 毫	1/10000	1/33,000 m	0.03030 mm	5/150,876 yd	0.001193 in
Rin	厘 or 釐	1/1000	1/3300 m	0.3030 mm	25/75,438 yd	0.01193 in
Bu	分	1/100	1/330 m	3.030 mm	125/37,719 yd	0.1193 in
Sun	寸	1/10	1/33 m	3.030 cm	1250/37,719 yd	1.193 in
Shaku	尺	1	10/33 m	30.30 cm	12,500/37,719 yd	11.93 in
Ken (Note: The ken is also found in English sources as the kin or glossed as the Japanese fathom.)	間	6	20/11 m	1.818 m	25,000/12,573 yd	5 ft 11.6 in
Hiro	尋	6	20/11 m	1.818 m	25,000/12,573 yd	5 ft 11.6 in
Jō	丈	10	100/33 m	3.030 m	125,000/37,719 yd	9 ft 11.3 in
Chō	町	360	1200/11 m	109.1 m	500,000/4191 yd	357 ft 11 in
Ri (Note: The Japanese ri is also frequently known by its Chinese name li or glossed as the Japanese mile.)	里	12,960	43,200/11 m	3.927 km	6,000,000/1397 yd	2.440 mi
Notes: Exact figures follow the 1891 Law of Weights & Measures and 1959 International Yard and Pound Agreement.; Approximations are rounded to four significant figures.; The names of the smallest units, borrowed from Chinese, also function as the Japanese names for the fractions "hundredth", "thousandth", and "ten-thousandth".; The ken is the normal unit of distance and length; the hiro used as the equivalent unit of depth.; Sometimes hiro is used equal to 5 shaku (50/33 m, ~1.5152 metres).

The traditional units are still used for construction materials in Japan. For example, plywood is usually manufactured in 182 cm × 91 cm (about 72 in × 36 in) sheets known in the trade as saburokuhan (3 × 6版), or 3 × 6 shaku. Each sheet is about the size of one tatami mat. The thicknesses of the sheets, however, are usually measured in millimetres. The names of these units also live in the name of the bamboo flute shakuhachi (尺八), literally "shaku eight", which measures one shaku and eight sun, and the Japanese version of the Tom Thumb story, Issun Bōshi (一寸法師), literally "one sun boy", as well as in many Japanese proverbs.

== Area ==
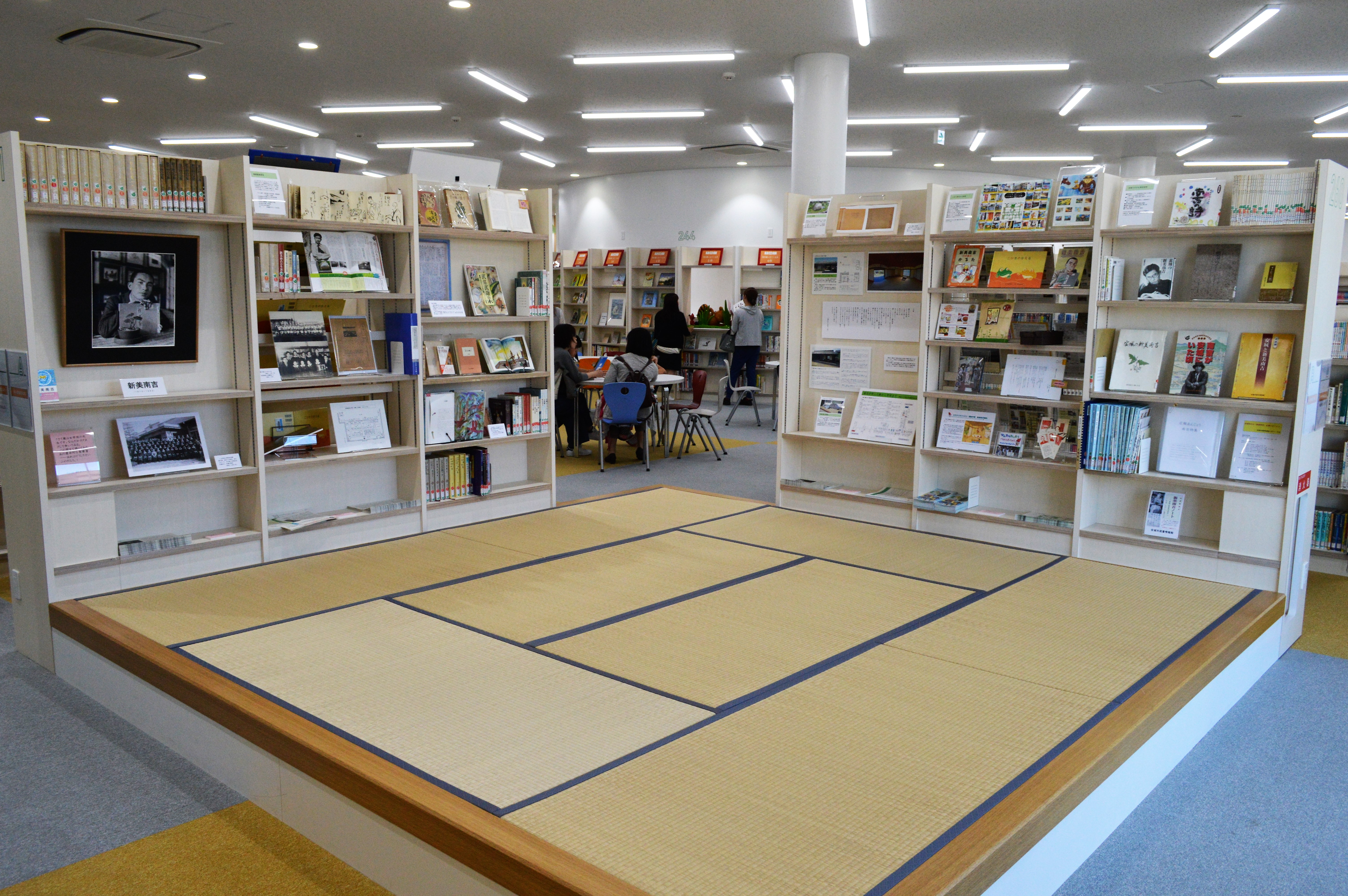
Area floored with 8 tatami mats (4 tsubo, or 8 jō)

The base unit of Japanese area is the tsubo, equivalent to a square ken or 36 square shaku. It is twice the size of the jō, the area of the Nagoya tatami mat. Both units are used informally in discussing real estate floorspace. Due to historical connections, the tsubo is still used as a unit of area in real estate in Taiwan, where it is called the píng.

In agricultural contexts, the tsubo is known as the bu. The larger units remain in common use by Japanese farmers when discussing the sizes of fields.

Table of area units
Unit		Tsubo	Metric		US & Imperial	
Romanized	Kanji	Tsubo	Exact	Approx.	Exact	Approx.
Shaku	勺	1/100	4/121 m^{2}	330.6 cm^{2}	6,250,000/158,080,329 sq yd	51.24 sq in
Gō	合	1/10	40/121 m^{2}	0.3306 m^{2}	62,500,000/158,080,329 sq yd	3.558 sq ft
Jō	畳 or 帖	1/2	200/121 m^{2}	1.653 m^{2}	312,500,000/158,080,329 sq yd	17.79 sq ft
Tsubo	坪	1	400/121 m^{2}	3.306 m^{2}	625,000,000/158,080,329 sq yd	35.58 sq ft
Bu	歩	1	400/121 m^{2}	3.306 m^{2}	625,000,000/158,080,329 sq yd	35.58 sq ft
Se	畝	30	12,000/121 m^{2}	99.17 m^{2}	6,250,000,000/52,693,443 sq yd	1,067 sq ft
Tan	段 or 反	300	120,000/121 m^{2}	991.7 m^{2}	62,500,000,000/52,693,443 sq yd	10,674.6 sq ft
Chō(bu) (Note: Chōbu is used rather than chō when no fraction follows.)	町(歩)	3000	1,200,000/121 m^{2}	0.9917 ha	625,000,000,000/52,693,443 sq yd	2.4505 acres
Notes: Approximations are rounded to four significant figures.

== Volume ==
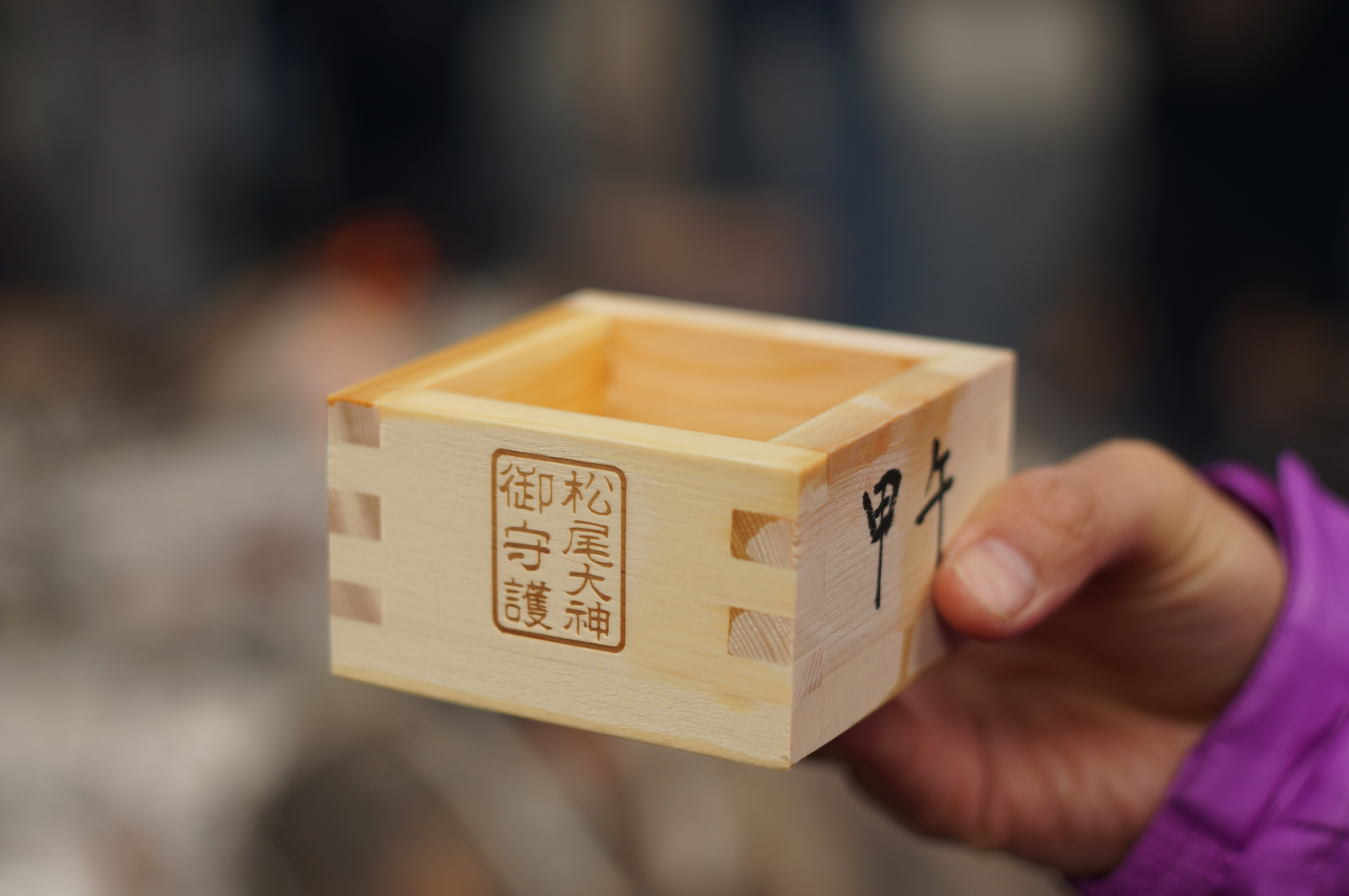
A wooden masu sake cup (1 gō) for celebrations

The base unit of Japanese volume is the shō, although the gō now sees more use since it is reckoned as the appropriate size of a serving of rice or sake. Sake and shochu are both commonly sold in large 1800 mL bottles known as isshōbin (一升瓶), literally "one shō bottle".

The koku is historically important: since it was reckoned as the amount of rice necessary to feed a person for a single year, it was used to compute agricultural output and official salaries. The koku of rice was sometimes reckoned as 3000 "sacks". By the 1940s the shipping koku was 1/10 of the shipping ton of 40 or 42 cu ft (i.e., 110–120 L); the koku of timber was about 10 cu ft (280 L); and the koku of fish, like many modern bushels, was no longer reckoned by volume but computed by weight (40 kan). The shakujime of timber was about 12 cu ft (340 L) and the taba about 108 ft³ (3,100 L or 3.1 m^{3}).

Table of volume units
Unit		Shō	Metric		US		Imperial	
Romanized	Kanji	Shō	Exact	Approx.	Exact	Approx.	Exact	Approx.
Sai	才	1/1000	2401/1,331,000 L	1.804 mL	37,515,625/15,900,351,812,136 cu yd	29.28 min	240,100/605,084,579 gal	30.47 min
Sai	才	1/1000	2401/1,331,000 L	1.804 mL	37,515,625/15,900,351,812,136 cu yd	0.1101 cu in	240,100/605,084,579 gal	30.47 min
Shaku	勺	1/100	2401/133,100 L	18.04 mL	187,578,125/7,950,175,906,068 cu yd	0.6100 fl oz	2,401,000/605,084,579 gal	0.6349 fl oz
Shaku	勺	1/100	2401/133,100 L	18.04 mL	187,578,125/7,950,175,906,068 cu yd	1.101 cu in	2,401,000/605,084,579 gal	0.6349 fl oz
Gō	合	1/10	2401/13,310 L	180.4 mL	937,890,625/3,975,087,953,034 cu yd	0.3812 pt	24,010,000/605,084,579 gal	0.3174 pt
Gō	合	1/10	2401/13,310 L	180.4 mL	937,890,625/3,975,087,953,034 cu yd	0.3276 dry pt	24,010,000/605,084,579 gal	0.3174 pt
Shō	升	1	2401/1331 L	1.804 L	4,689,453,125/1,987,543,976,517 cu yd	1.906 qt	240,100,000/605,084,579 gal	1.587 qt
Shō	升	1	2401/1331 L	1.804 L	4,689,453,125/1,987,543,976,517 cu yd	1.638 dry qt	240,100,000/605,084,579 gal	1.587 qt
To	斗	10	24,010/1331 L	18.04 L	46,894,531,250/1,987,543,976,517 cu yd	4.765 gal	2,401,000,000/605,084,579 gal	3.968 gal
To	斗	10	24,010/1331 L	18.04 L	46,894,531,250/1,987,543,976,517 cu yd	2.048 pk	2,401,000,000/605,084,579 gal	3.968 gal
Koku (Note: The koku has also appeared in English as the kokf and its multiples as the ikwankokf or ickmagog (1000 koku) and man-kokf or managoga (10,000 koku).)	石	100	240,100/1331 L	180.4 L	468,945,312,500/1,987,543,976,517 cu yd	47.65 gal	24,010,000,000/605,084,579 gal	39.680 gal
Koku	石	100	240,100/1331 L	180.4 L	468,945,312,500/1,987,543,976,517 cu yd	5.119 bu	24,010,000,000/605,084,579 gal	39.680 gal
Notes: Approximations are rounded to four significant figures.

== Mass ==
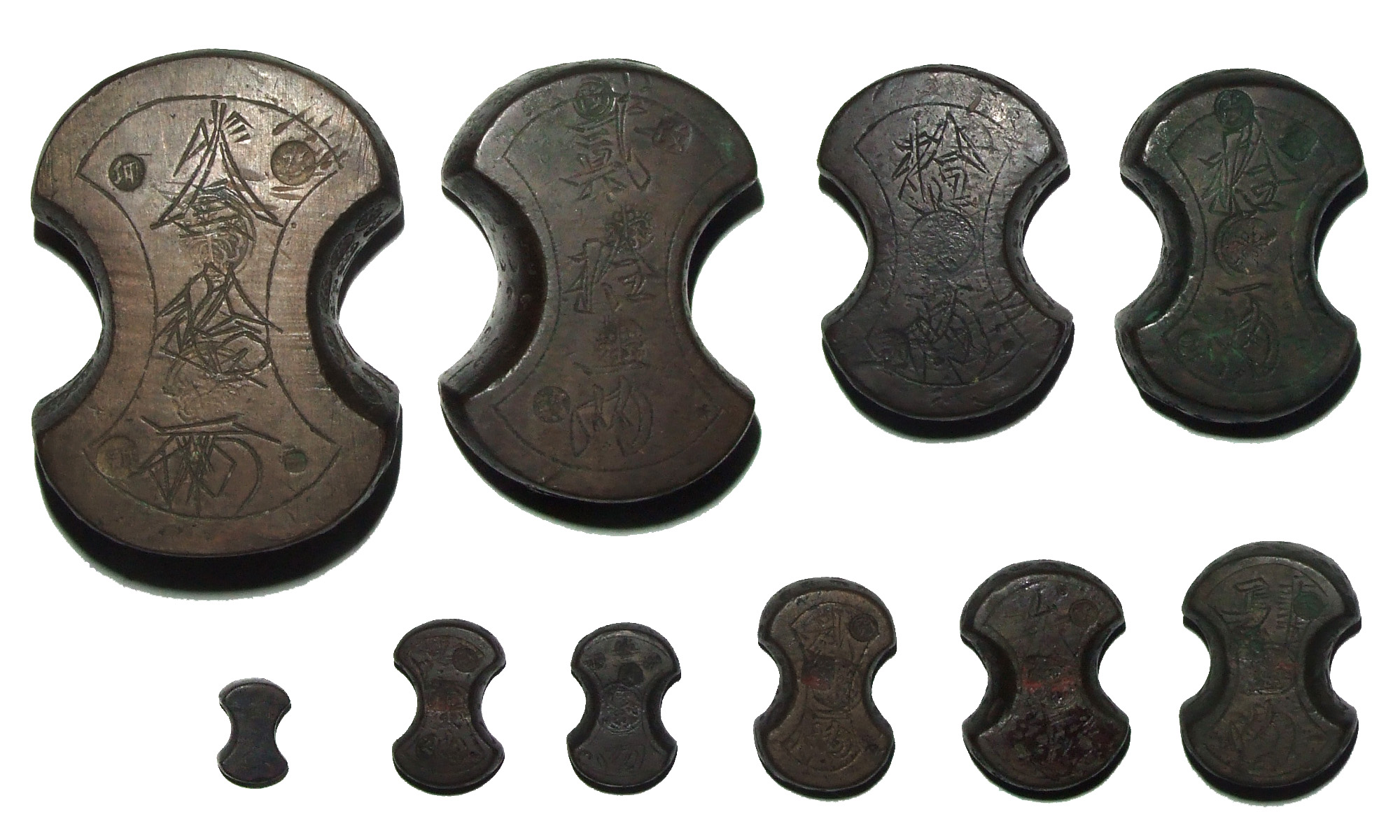
A set of ten traditional Japanese fundō weights, used by money changers to weigh coinage. Top row from left are 30 ryō (1124.66 g), 20 ryō (749.07 g) and 10 ryō (374.62 g, twice), bottom row from left are 3 momme (11.19 g), 1 ryō (37.47 g, twice), 2 ryō (74.89 g), 3 ryō (112.42 g) and 4 ryō (149.77 g). All metric weights actual, not rounded.

The base unit of Japanese mass is the kan, although the momme is more common. It is a recognised unit in the international pearl industry. In English-speaking countries, momme is typically abbreviated as mo.

The Japanese form of the Chinese tael was the ryō (両). (Note: The ryō is sometimes written in English as ryo, without its macron. It also appears in English sources as the tael, the táīl, the táhil, and the táïl.) It was customarily reckoned as around 4 or 10 momme but, because of its importance as a fundamental unit of the silver and gold bullion used as currency in medieval Japan, it varied over time and location from those notional values.

Table of units of mass
Unit		Kan	Metric		US & Imperial	
Romanised	Kanji	Kan	Legal	Decimal	Exact	Approx.
Mō	毛 or 毫	1/1,000,000	3/800,000 kg	3.75 mg	375/45,359,237 lb	8.267 μlb
Rin	厘	1/100,000	3/80,000 kg	37.5 mg	3750/45,359,237 lb	0.5787 gr
Fun (Note: The fun is more often known in English as the candareen. It also sometimes appears as the kondúrí or konderi.)	分	1/10,000	3/8000 kg	375 mg	37,500/45,359,237 lb	5.787 gr
Momme; Monme (Note: Although monme is the Revised Hepburn romanization of the unit, momme is more common in English. It also sometimes appears as the mommé, me, or mas.)	匁	1/1000	3/800 kg	3.75 g	375,000/45,359,237 lb	2.116 dr
Hyakume	百目	1/10	3/8 kg	375 g	37,500,000/45,359,237 lb	13.23 oz
Kin (Note: Particularly in historical sources, the kin is more commonly known in English as the catty or katí.)	斤	4/25	3/5 kg	600 g	60,000,000/45,359,237 lb	1.323 lb
Kan(me) (Note: The kan is also sometimes known in English as the kwan.)	貫(目)	1	15/4 kg	3.75 kg	375,000,000/45,359,237 lb	8.267 lb
Maru	丸	8	30 kg		3,000,000,000/45,359,237 lb	66.14 lb
Tan (Note: Particularly in historical sources, the tan is more commonly known in English as the picul, pikul, or pikel.)	担 or 擔	16	60 kg		6,000,000,000/45,359,237 lb	132.3 lb
Notes: Exact figures follow the 1891 Law of Weights & Measures and 1959 International Yard and Pound Agreement.; Metric values are exact. US & imperial approximations are rounded to four significant figures.

== Imperial units ==
Imperial units are sometimes used in Japan. Feet and inches are used for most non-sport bicycles, whose tyre sizes follow a British system; for sizes of magnetic tape and many pieces of computer hardware; for photograph sizes; and for the sizes of electronic displays for electronic devices. Photographic prints, however, are usually rounded to the nearest millimetre and screens are not described in terms of inches but "type" (型, gata). For instance, a television whose screen has a 17-inch diagonal is described as a "17-type" (17型) and one with a 32-inch widescreen screen is called a "32-vista-type" (32V型).

== See also ==
- Japanese numerals, counter words, currency, & clocks
- Heavenly Stems & Earthly Branches
- Units, Systems, & History of measurement
- Chinese, Taiwanese, Hong Kong, Mongolian, Korean, & Vietnamese units of measurement
- Metric system & Metrication

== Bibliography ==
- Oxford English Dictionary, Oxford: Oxford University Press.
- Iwata, Shigeo. "Weights and Measures in Japan" article in "Encyclopaedia of the History of Science, Technology, and Medicine in Non-Western Cultures". Encyclopaedia of the History of Science, Technology, and Medicine in Non-Western Cultures See Iwata's full table here: Encyclopaedia of the History of Science, Technology, and Medicine in Non-Western Cultures
- Gyllenbok, Jan. "Encyclopaedia of Historical Metrology, Weights and Measures", Vol 1. Encyclopaedia of Historical Metrology, Weights, and Measures
- "Japanese Weights, Measures, and Moneys", Handbook on Japanese Military Forces, Technical Manual E 30–480, Washington: US War Department, 1944, p. 400–1, ISBN 9780807164464, reprinted by the Louisiana State University Press at Baton Rouge in 1991.
- Lyon, Samuel V. (1902), "Trade in 1901", Commercial Relations of the United States with Foreign Countries during the Year 1901, Vol. I, Washington: Bureau of Foreign Commerce, pp. 915–934.
- Tamano, Mitsuo (July 1971), "Japan's Transition to the Metric System", US Metric Study Interim Report, No. 3: Commercial Weights and Measures, National Bureau of Standards Special Publication 345–3, Washington: US Department of Commerce, pp. 97–102.
- Nagase-Reimer, Keiko (2016), Copper in the Early Modern Sino-Japanese Trade, Monies, Markets, and Finance in East Asia, 1600–1900, Vol. VII, Leiden: Brill, ISBN 9789004304512.
- Renouard, George Cecil (1845), "Japan", Encyclopaedia Metropolitana, or, Universal Dictionary of Knowledge, Vol. XX: Miscellaneous and Lexicographical, Vol. 7, London: B. Fellowes & al., pp. 470 ff.
