= Sake set =

Flask and cups to serve sake

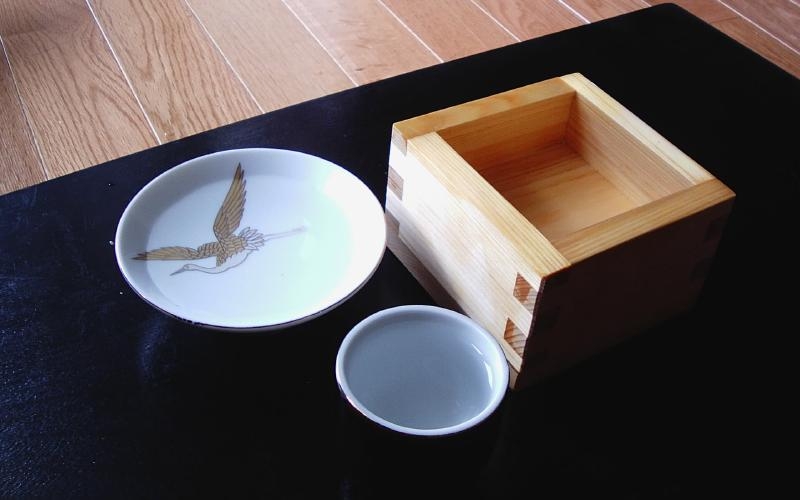
Sake can be served in a wide variety of cups; here is a sakazuki (flat saucer-like cup), ochoko (small cylindrical cup), and masu (wooden box cup).

A sake set (酒器, shuki) consists of the flask and cups used to serve sake. Sake sets are most often in Japanese pottery, but may be wood, lacquered wood, glass or plastic. The flask and cups may be sold individually or as a set.

Sake cups are normally small, with variable shapes but based on traditional bowls used for tea. They are normally without handles, and most often without stems.

== Server ==
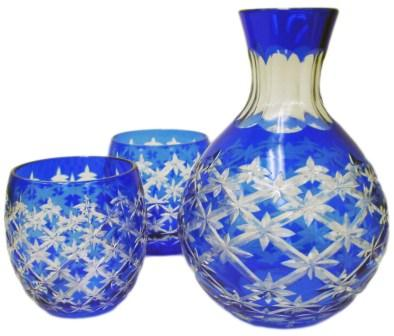
Kiriko (切子, cut glass) tokkuri and ochoko

The server of a sake set is a flask called a tokkuri (徳利). A tokkuri is generally bulbous with a narrow neck, which tends to be called a "flask" in English, but may have a variety of other shapes, including that of a spouted vessel (katakuchi), similar to a Western teapot. Traditionally, heated sake is often warmed by placing the sake-filled tokkuri in a pan of hot water, and thus the narrowed neck would prevent the heat from escaping. In more authentic places such as oden bars and ryōtei in Japan, sake is sometimes warmed and served in metal containers known as chirori (銚釐) or tanpo (湯婆). Recently, glass chirori are also used to chill sake.

== Drinking cups ==
Formerly, sake was sold by volume in a wooden box measuring cup, known as a masu which has a volume of one gō (180 ml, 6.3 imp fl oz, 6.1 US fl oz) and was also used to drink. In the past, the wooden box was said to complement the traditionally brewed sake, as it is brewed in a wooden cask (樽), but in modern times, the masu is shunned by sake purists because the wood affects the flavor of the sake. Furthermore, tradition requires the masu be filled to the rim as a sign of prosperity. Masu are now commonly made of lacquerware or even of ABS plastic. As the traditional sake-serving cup and a symbol of prosperity due to sharing the same pronunciation as the Japanese word for increase/proliferate (増す), the masu is still used in modern times for the purpose of ceremony or to show generosity. In some Japanese restaurants, the server may put a glass inside the masu (or put the masu inside a saucer) and pour until the sake overflows and spills into the secondary container to symbolize this wealth.

Nowadays, the sake is typically served in ceramic cups. The cups used for drinking sake are generally small cylindrical vessels called o-choko or choko (猪口, o- is an honorific prefix in Japanese used such as o-sake and o-makase), but may also include flatter shapes such as wide-mouthed bowls. Sakazuki are ceremonial cups used most commonly at weddings and other special occasions such as tea ceremonies, but larger versions of sakazuki also exist.

While not a traditional serving utensil, a shot glass is also used. In the United States, it is used as a substitute for ochoko, while in Japan it is used in conjunction with masu. Sake stemware is also used, which is essentially a glass sake cup elevated above a wide base. Sake stemware, as well as glass tokkuri, are now commonly used to serve chilled sake.

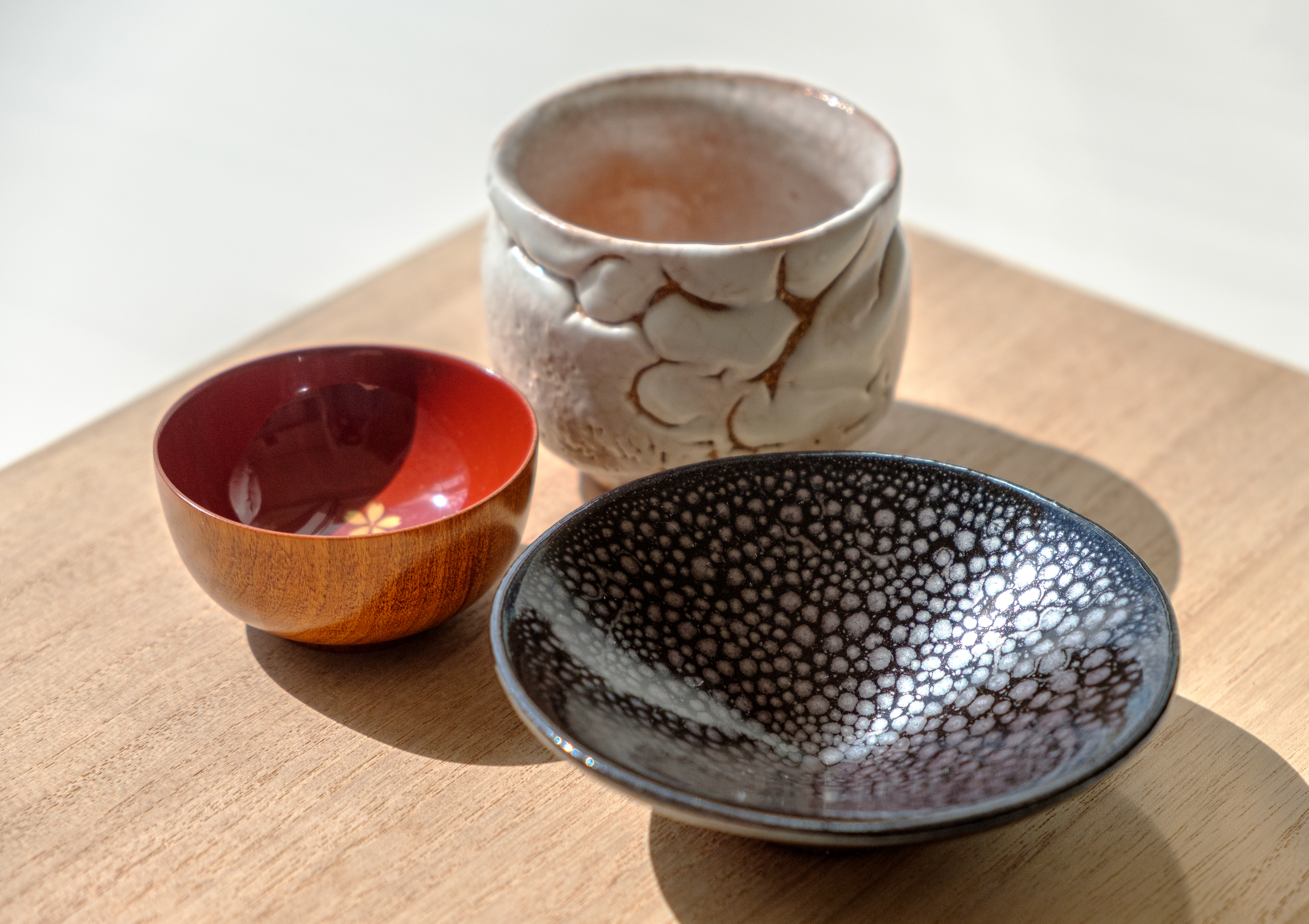
Three traditional sake cup shapes

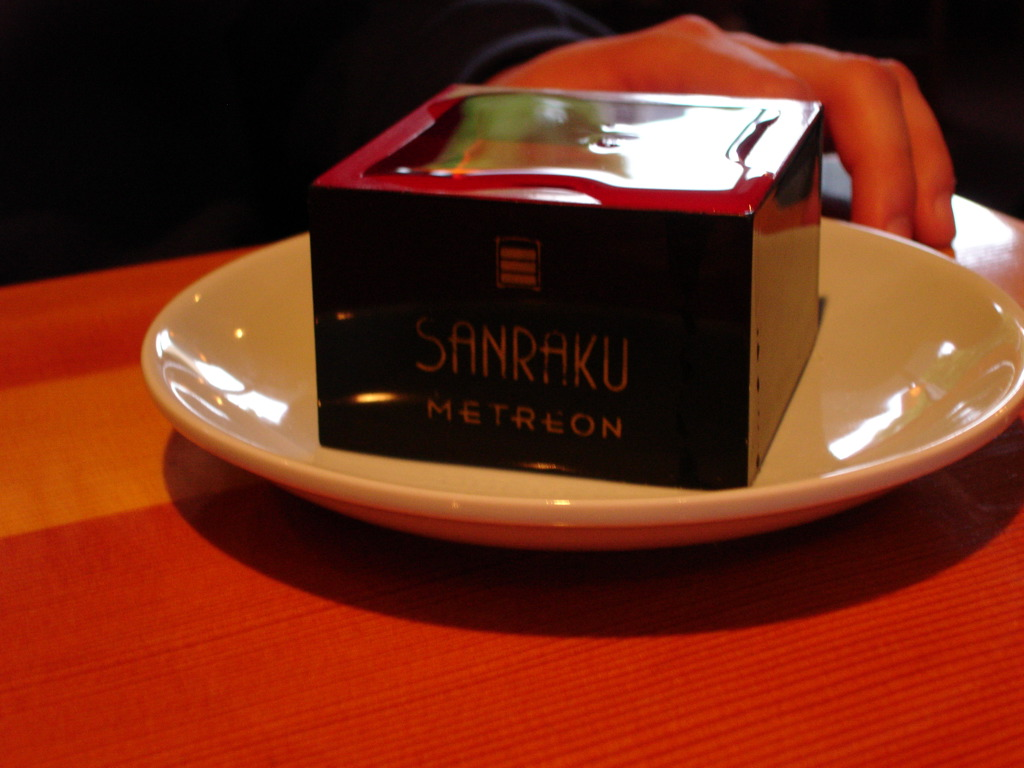
A decorated lacquer masu

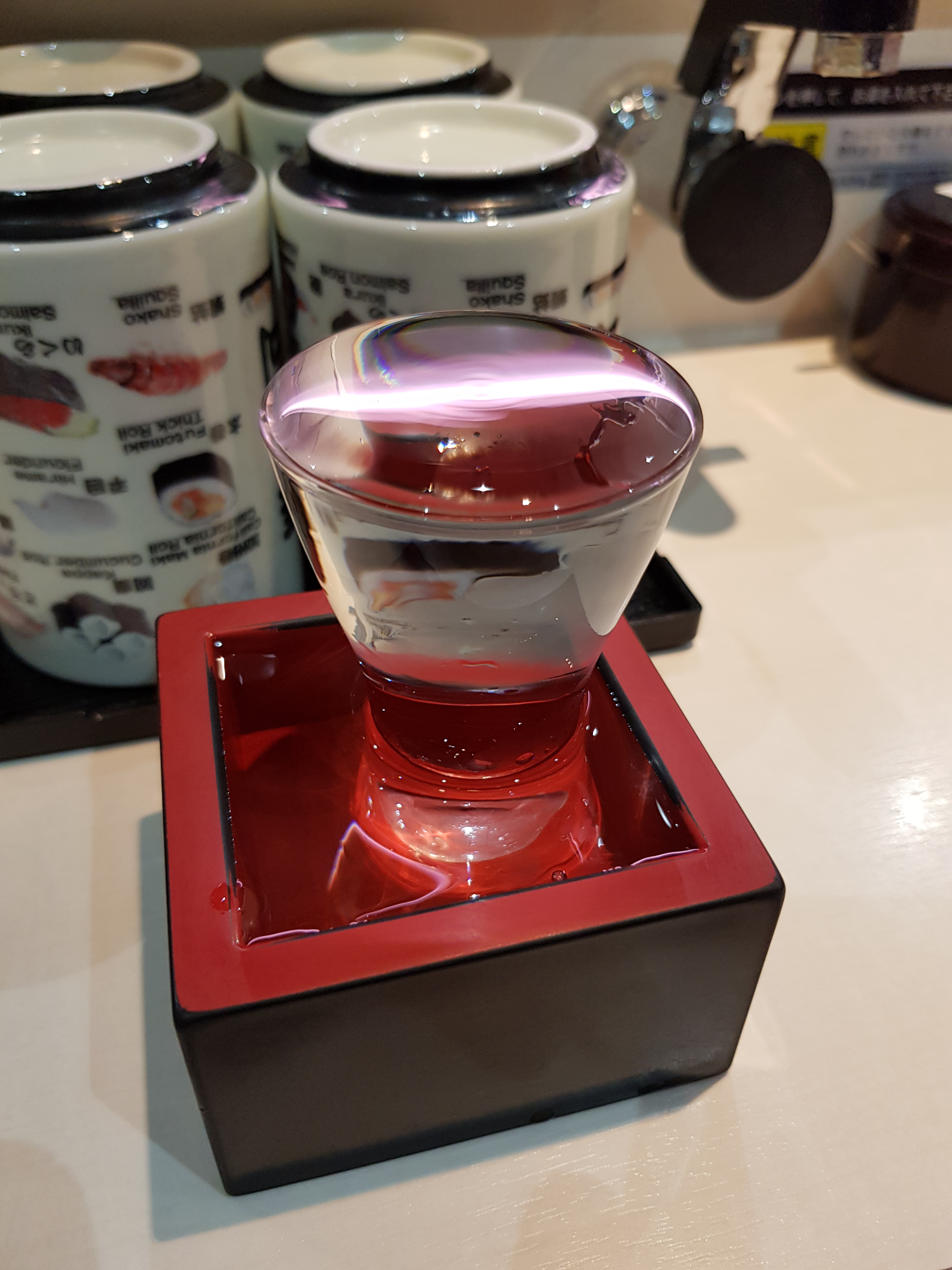
Overflowing glass inside the masu

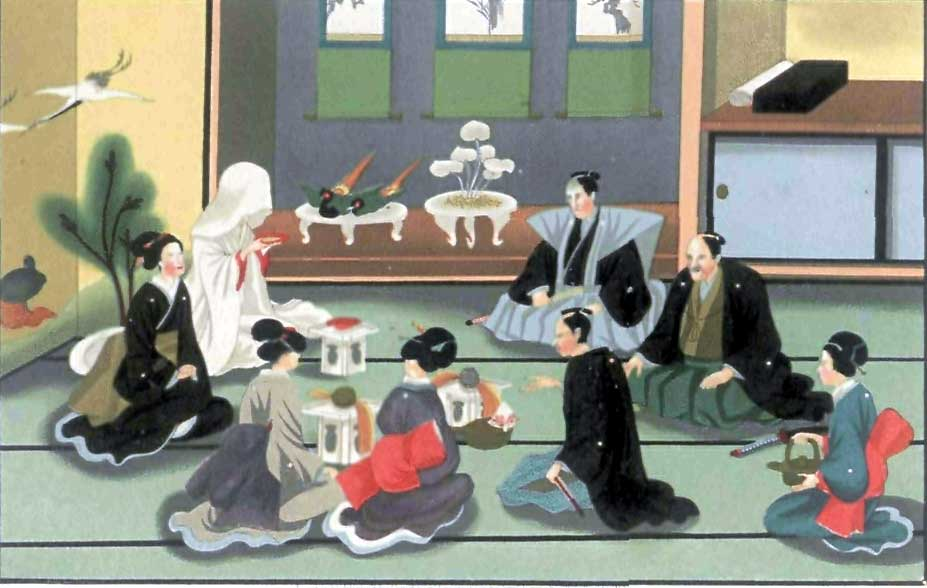
The bride is sipping sake from a sakazuki in san-san-kudo (三三九度) ritual in a Japanese wedding. A woman on the right is holding a chōshi (銚子) sake server. From Sketches of Japanese Manners and Customs, Illustrated by Native Drawings... by J. M. W. Silver, published in London in 1867.

Masu being used to drink sake at a sake barrel breaking ritual in Japan, 2020
