= Masu (measurement) =

Square wooden box used to measure rice

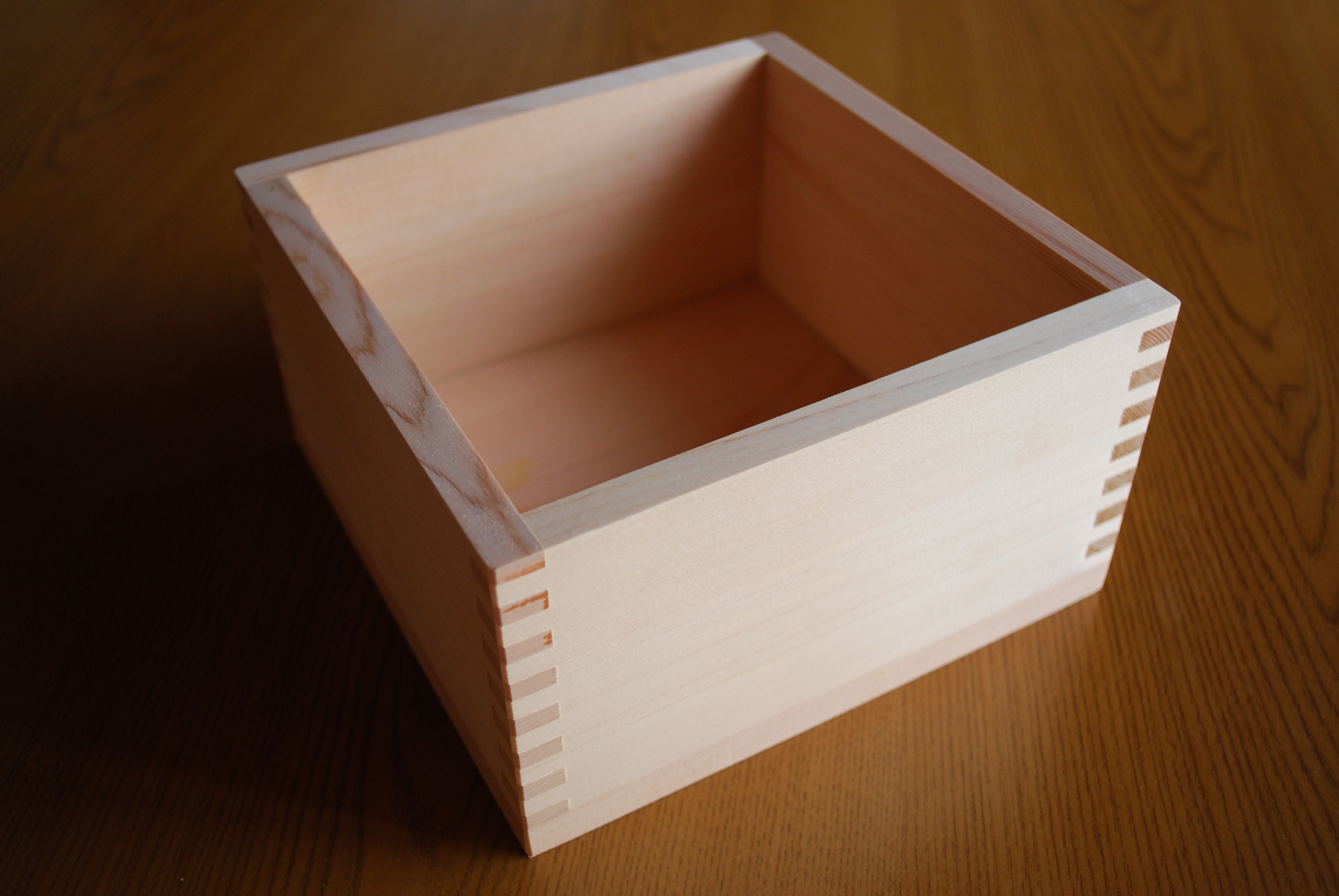
1-Shō masu, a wooden box. (10 times volume of 1-gō masu)

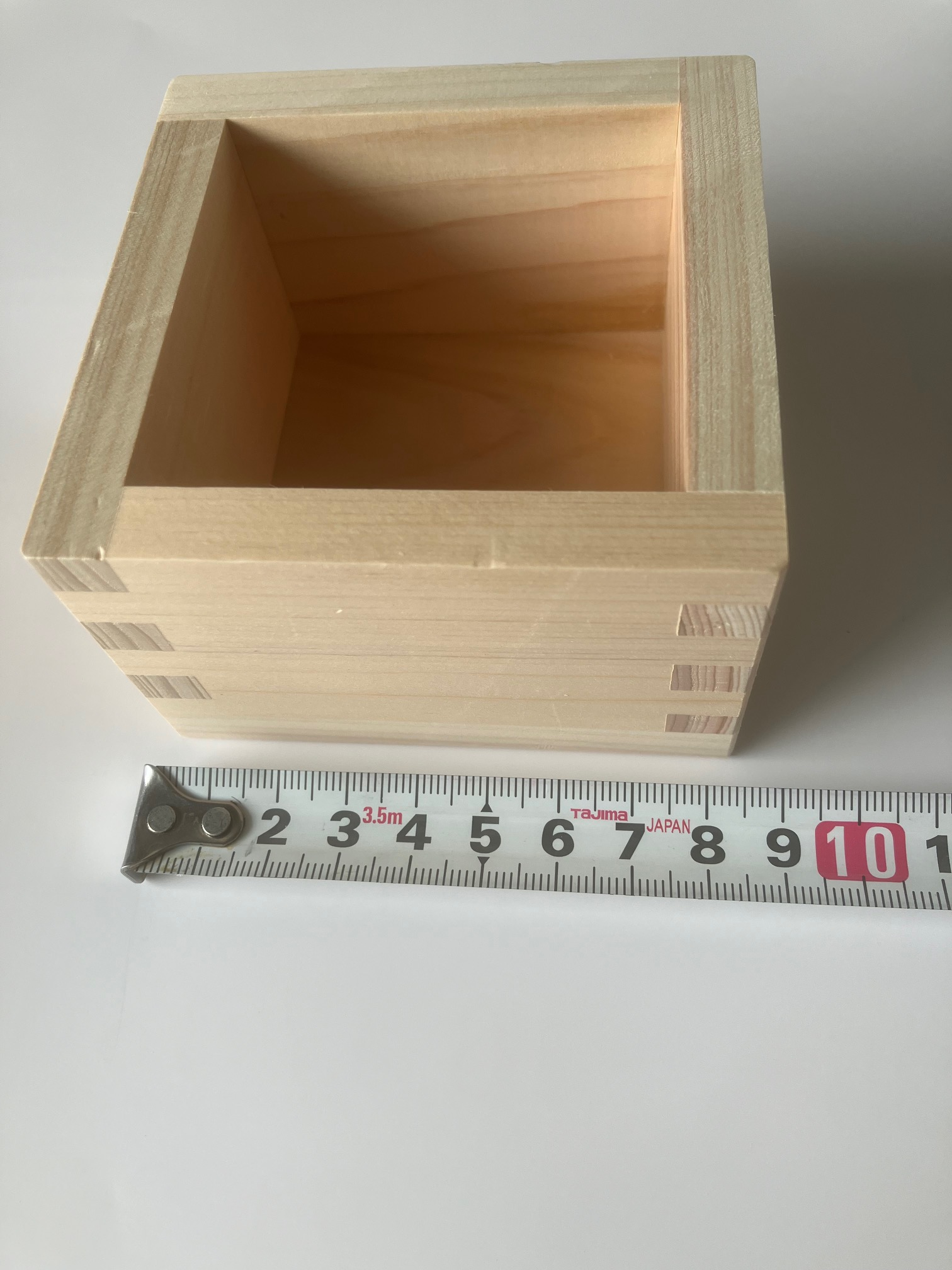
1-gō masu, a wooden box used for measuring portions of rice or sake

A masu (枡 ("square")) was originally a square wooden box used to measure rice in Japan during the feudal period. In 1885 Japan signed the Convention du Mètre and in 1886 converted all of its traditional measures to the metric system.

Masu existed in many sizes, typically covering the range from one gō (一合枡, ichigōmasu; c. 180 mL), one shō (ja:一升桝), isshōmasu c. 1.8 L) to one to (一斗枡, ittomasu; c. 18 L).

The advent of modern rice cookers and a higher calorie diet in Japan has made them impractical for measuring portions of rice, though the plastic cups used with rice cookers now have a 180 mL or one gō capacity

Today masu are largely used for drinking sake. Drinking vessels are made from hinoki (Japanese Cypress wood), as it imparts a special scent and flavor. The drinker sips from the corner of the box, which pours it into the mouth.
Toasts are poured by stacking a pyramid of the guests' masu on a towel or cloth, with the toastmaker's masu on top. It is then overflowed until it fills all the masu beneath it. This symbolizes the generosity of the toaster to their friends and how they wish to share their happiness and good fortune with them.

- Sanjakumasu (3 shaku [54 ml]) = Often used in bars to hold a 50 ml shotglass, which is then filled to overflowing (Note: This service custom is called sosogi-koboshi ("overflowing pour") or mokkiri zake ("generous sake"). Originally the small masu or a sakazuki (flat sake saucer) was placed under a ochoko (sake cup) or shotglass to catch spilt liquor or to use as a coaster. After World War 2 it was used in bars as a bonus to the customer to hustle up business. It then spread to the upper echelons of the hospitality industry.) to make up the difference. If the shotglass is used for sake, it is served chilled or at room-temperature. The sanjakumasu can also be used in the san san kudo wedding ceremony in the place of the sakazuki (sake dish).
- Goshakumasu (5 shaku [90 ml]) = Holds a half gō measure.
- Hasshakumasu (8 shaku or 4/5 gō [144 ml]) = The former standard masu size, probably because 8 is a lucky number.
- Ichigōmasu (1 gō [180 ml]) = The modern standard masu size, equal to a measure of 1 gō (0.18039 L) or 10 shaku.
- Nigōhanmasu (2.5 gō [450 ml.]) = Holds a quarter shō measure.
- Gogōmasu (5 gō [900 ml]) = Holds a half shō measure.
- Isshōmasu (1 shō or 10 gō [1.8 L]) = Holds a full shō measure.

A small 65 by 65 by 55 mm (2.5 by 2.5 by 2.25 in), lidded form of masu, is sold for serving pepper, salt, sugar, and other dry condiments at the table.

== See also ==
- Sake set
- Japanese units of measurement
