= Pyeong =

Traditional Korean unit of area and floorspace

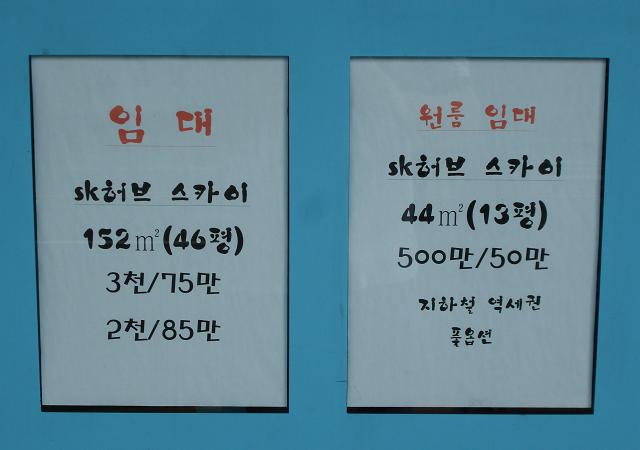
- Listing outside a Korean real-estate agency showing floorspace in square meters and pyeong

Chinese name
- Traditional Chinese: 坪
Transcriptions
Standard Mandarin
- Hanyu Pinyin: píng
- Wade–Giles: p'ing
Southern Min
- Hokkien POJ: pêⁿ pîⁿ phêⁿ phîⁿ phiâⁿ phêng
- Tâi-lô: pênn

Korean name
- Hangul: 평
- Hanja: 坪
Transcriptions
- Revised Romanization: pyeong
- McCune–Reischauer: p'yŏng

Japanese name
- Kanji: 坪
- Kana: つぼ
Transcriptions
- Romanization: tsubo

A pyeong (abbreviation py) is a Korean unit of area and floorspace, equal to a square kan or 36 square Korean feet. The ping and tsubo are its equivalent Taiwanese and Japanese units, similarly based on a square bu (ja:步) or ken, equivalent to 36 square Chinese or Japanese feet.

== Current use ==
=== Korea ===
In Korea, the period of Japanese occupation produced a pyeong of 400/121 or 3.3058 m^{2}. It is the standard traditional measure for real estate floorspace, with an average house reckoned as about 25 pyeong, a studio apartment as 8–12 py, and a garret as 1½ py. In South Korea, the unit has been officially banned since 1961 but with little effect prior to the criminalization of its commercial use effective 1 July 2007. Informal use continues, however, including in the form of real estate use of unusual fractions of meters equivalent to unit amounts of pyeong. Real estate listings on major websites such as Daum show measurements in square meters with the pyeong equivalent.

=== Taiwan ===
In Taiwan, the Taiwanese ping was introduced in the period of Taiwan under Japanese rule, which remains in fairly common use and is about 3.305 m^{2}.

=== Japan ===
In Japan, the usual measure of real estate floorspace is the tatami and the tsubo is reckoned as two tatami. The tatami varies by region but the modern standard is usually taken to be the Nagoya tatami of about 1.653 m^{2}, producing a tsubo of 3.306 m^{2}. It is sometimes reckoned as comprising 10 gō.

=== China ===
In China, the metrication of traditional units would produce a ping of 4 m^{2}, but it is almost unknown, with most real estate floorspace simply reckoned in square meters. The longer length of the Hong Kong foot produces a larger ping of almost 5 m^{2}, but it is similarly uncommon.

== See also ==
- Japanese units of measurement
- Korean units of measurement
- Taiwanese units of measurement
- Chinese units of measurement
