= Ge (unit) =

Chinese unit of volume

Chinese name
- Chinese: 合
Transcriptions
Standard Mandarin
- Hanyu Pinyin: gě
- Wade–Giles: ko

Korean name
- Hangul: 홉
Transcriptions
- Revised Romanization: hop
- McCune–Reischauer: hop

Japanese name
- Kanji: 合
Transcriptions
- Romanization: gō

The ge (Chinese: 合; pinyin: gě) is a traditional Chinese unit of volume equal to 1/10 sheng. Its Korean equivalent is the hop (or hob) and its Japanese equivalent is the gō.

== China ==
The ge is a traditional Chinese unit of volume equal to 10 shao or 1/10 sheng. Its exact value has varied over time with the size of the sheng.

In 1915, the Beiyang Government set the ge as equivalent to 103.54688 milliliters (3.501 U.S. fl oz). The Nationalist Government's 1929 Weights and Measures Act, effective 1 January 1930, set it equal to the deciliter (3.381 fl oz or 0.182 dry pt). The People's Republic of China confirmed that value in 1959, although it made the official Chinese name of the deciliter the fēnshēng (分升) and exempted TCM pharmacists from punishment for noncompliance with the new measure when traditional amounts were required for preparing medicine.

1 ge	=	1/10	liters
	=	100	milliliters
	≈	3.52	imperial fluid ounces
	≈	3.38	US fluid ounces
	=	0.4	metric cup

== Korea ==
The hop is a traditional Korean unit based on the ge which is equal to 1/10 doe (SK) or toe (NK). Its exact value has varied over time with the size of the doe.

During its occupation, Korea's native measures were standardized to their Japanese equivalents. The present-day hop is 2401/13310 litres (6.1 fl oz or 0.328 dry pt), the same as the Japanese gō. Its use for commercial purposes has been criminalized in South Korea, although it continues to be used in the North.

== Japan ==
=== Volume ===
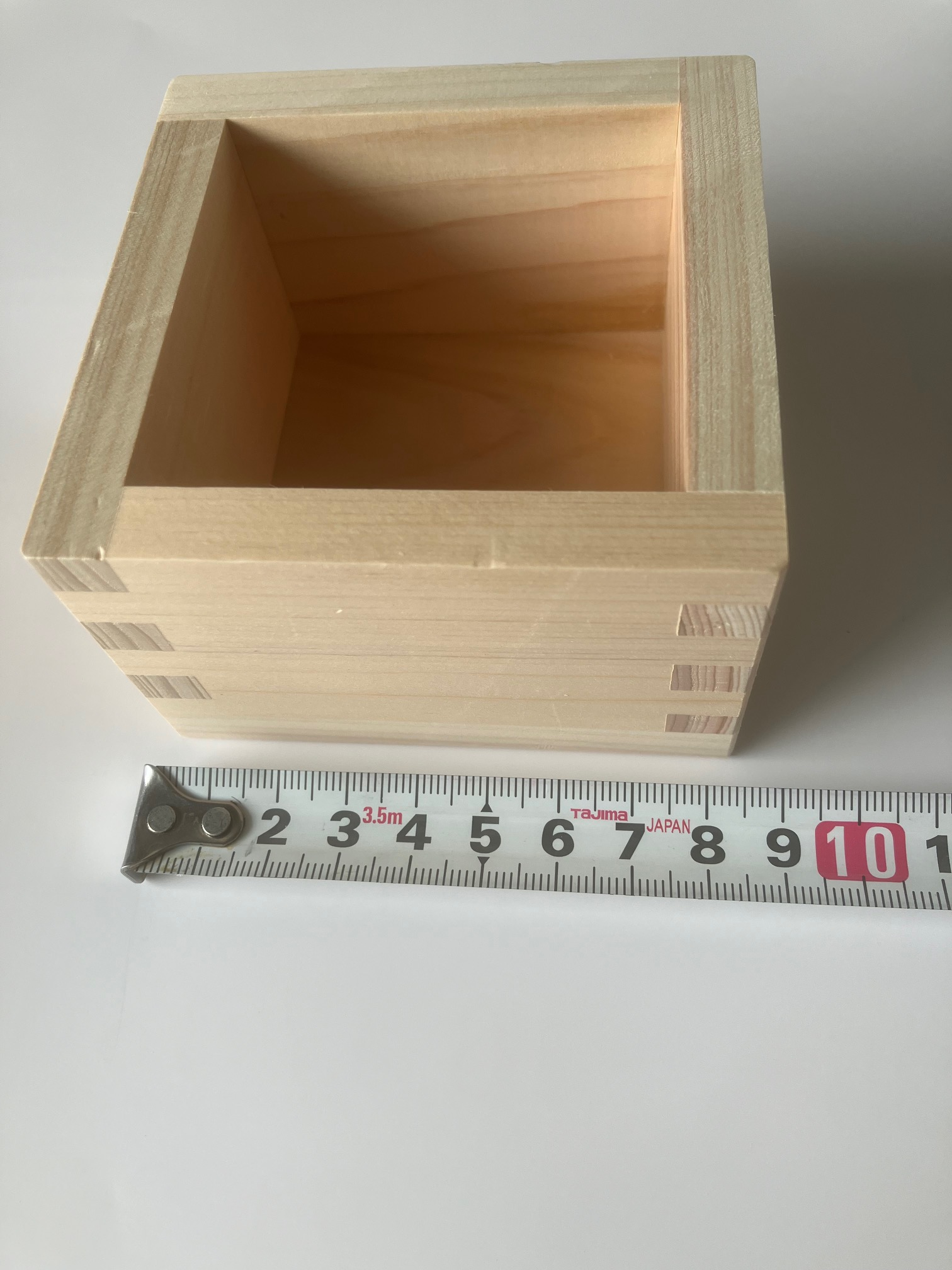
A 1-gō masu, a wooden box used for measuring portions of rice or sake

The gō or cup is a traditional Japanese unit based on the ge which is equal to 10 shaku or 1/10 shō.

It was officially equated with 2401/13310 liters in 1891. The gō is the traditional amount used for a serving of rice (measured before cooking) and a cup of sake in Japanese cuisine. Although the gō is no longer used as an official unit, 1-gō measuring cups or their 180 mL metric equivalents are often included with Japanese rice cookers. In dining, a 1-gō serving is sometimes equated with 150 g of Japanese short-grain rice. It also appears as a serving size for fugu and other fish. Since sake bottles are typically either 720 or 750 mL, they can be reckoned as holding about four cups.

1 gō	=	2401/13310	liters
	≈	180.4	milliliters
	≈	6.35	imperial fluid ounces
	≈	6.10	US fluid ounces
	≈	3/4	metric cup

=== Area ===
The gō is also used as a unit equal to 1/10 tsubo. This is approximately equal to 0.3306 m².

=== Mountaineering ===
In Japanese mountaineering terms, the distance from the foot of a mountain to the summit is divided into 10 gō, and the points corresponding to these tenths of the route are generally referred to as "stations" in English.

== See also ==
- Japanese cup, a separate modern unit of precisely 200 mL
