= Quart =

Unit of volume with different values

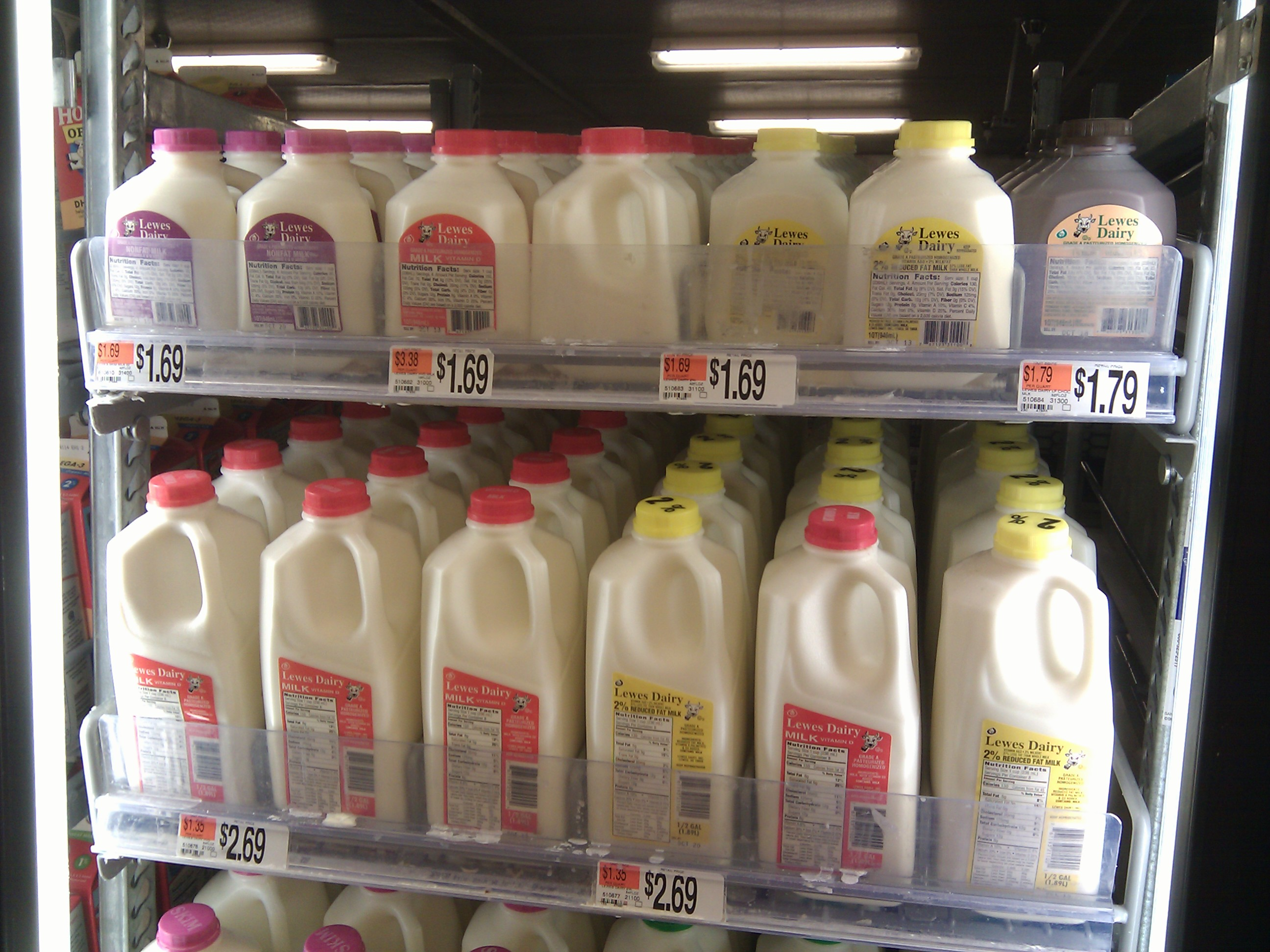
- One-quart milk jugs (top shelf); half-gallon (two-quart) milk jugs (bottom shelf)

General information
- Unit of: Volume
- Symbol: qt

Conversions (imperial)
1 imp qt in ...	... is equal to ...
- SI-compatible units: 1.1365225 L
- US customary units: ≈ 1.200950 US qt
- US customary units: ≈ 69.354858 in^{3}

Conversions (US)
1 US qt in ...	... is equal to ...
- SI-compatible units: 0.946352946 L
- Imperial units: ≈ 0.8326742 imp qt
- Imperial units: 57.75 in^{3}
- US dry quarts: 92400/107521 dry qt

The quart (symbol: qt) is a unit of volume equal to a quarter of a gallon. Three kinds of quarts are currently used: the liquid quart and dry quart of the US customary system and the imperial quart of the British imperial system. It is divided into two pints or (in the US) four cups. Historically, the size of a quart has varied with the different values of gallons over time, and in the case of the dry quart, in reference to different commodities.

== Name ==
The term comes from the Latin quartus (meaning one-quarter) via the French quart. However, although the French word quart has the same root, it frequently means something entirely different. In Canadian French in particular, the quart is called pinte, while the pint is called chopine.

== History ==
Since gallons of various sizes have historically been in use, the corresponding quarts have also existed with various sizes.

== Definitions and equivalencies ==
=== Imperial quart ===
The imperial quart is equal to one-quarter of an imperial gallon of exactly 4.54609 L, i.e. 1.1365225 L. In the United Kingdom, goods may be sold by the quart if the equivalent metric measure is also given.

1 imperial quart	≡	1/4	imperial gallon
	≡	2	imperial pints
	≡	8	imperial gills
	≡	40	imperial fluid ounces
	≡	1.1365225	liters (Note: This has been the exact conversion since the redefinition of the imperial gallon in 1976 in the UK, and in 1964 in Canada.)
	≈	69.354858	cubic inches
	≈	0.3002375	US gallons
	≈	1.20095	US liquid quarts
	≈	2.4019	US liquid pints
	≈	9.6076	US gills
	≈	38.4304	US fluid ounces
	≈	1.0320567	US dry quarts
	≈	2.0641135	US dry pints

In Canadian French, by federal law, the imperial quart is called pinte.

=== US liquid quart ===
In the United States, traditional length and volume measures have been legally standardized for commerce by the international yard and pound agreement of 1959, using the definition of 1 yard being 0.9144 meters: from this definition the metric equivalents for inches, feet, miles, area measures, and measures of volume are determined. The US liquid quart is equal to one-quarter of a gallon of exactly 231 cubic inches, i.e. 57.75 cubic inches or 0.946352946 L.

1 US liquid quart	≡	1/4	US gallon
	≡	2	US liquid pints
	≡	4	US cups
	≡	8	US gills
	≡	32	US fluid ounces
	≡	0.946352946	liters
	≡	57.75	cubic inches
	≈	0.2081685	imperial gallons
	≈	0.8326742	imperial quarts
	≈	1.6653484	imperial pints
	≈	6.6613935	imperial gills
	≈	33.3069674	imperial fluid ounces
	≡	92400/107521	US dry quart
	≡	1 77279/107521	US dry pints

=== US dry quart ===
In the United States, the dry quart is equal to 1/32 of a US bushel of exactly 2150.42 cubic inches, i.e. 67.200625 cubic inches or 1.101220942715 L.

1 US dry quart	≡	1/32	US bushel
	≡	1/8	US peck
	≡	2	US dry pints
	≡	1.101220942715	liters
	≡	67.200625	cubic inches
	≡	107521/369600	US gallon
	≡	1 15121/92400	US liquid quarts
	≡	2 15121/46200	US liquid pints
	≡	9 3571/11550	US gills
	≡	37 1367/5775	US fluid ounces
	≈	0.2422347	imperial gallons
	≈	0.968939	imperial quarts
	≈	1.9378779	imperial pints
	≈	7.7515118	imperial gills
	≈	38.7575589	imperial fluid ounces

== Winchester quart ==
The Winchester quart is an obsolescent measure: it was originally equal to two imperial quarts (half of an imperial gallon) or exactly 2.273045 L, but was later metricated to 2.5 L (2.2 imperial quarts). Despite its name, it is unrelated to the Winchester measure.

The 2.5 L bottles in which laboratory chemicals are supplied are sometimes referred to as Winchester quart bottles, although these contain 10% more than a traditional Winchester quart.

== Reputed quart ==
The reputed quart was a measure equal to two-thirds of an imperial quart (or one-sixth of an imperial gallon), i.e. exactly 0.7576816̅ liters: this is only 0.08% larger than one US fifth (exactly 0.7570823568 liters).

The reputed quart was previously recognized as the standard size of wine bottle in the United Kingdom, and is only about 1% larger than the current standard wine bottle of 0.75 L.
