= Fluid ounce =

Unit of volume in imperial and US customary measurement systems

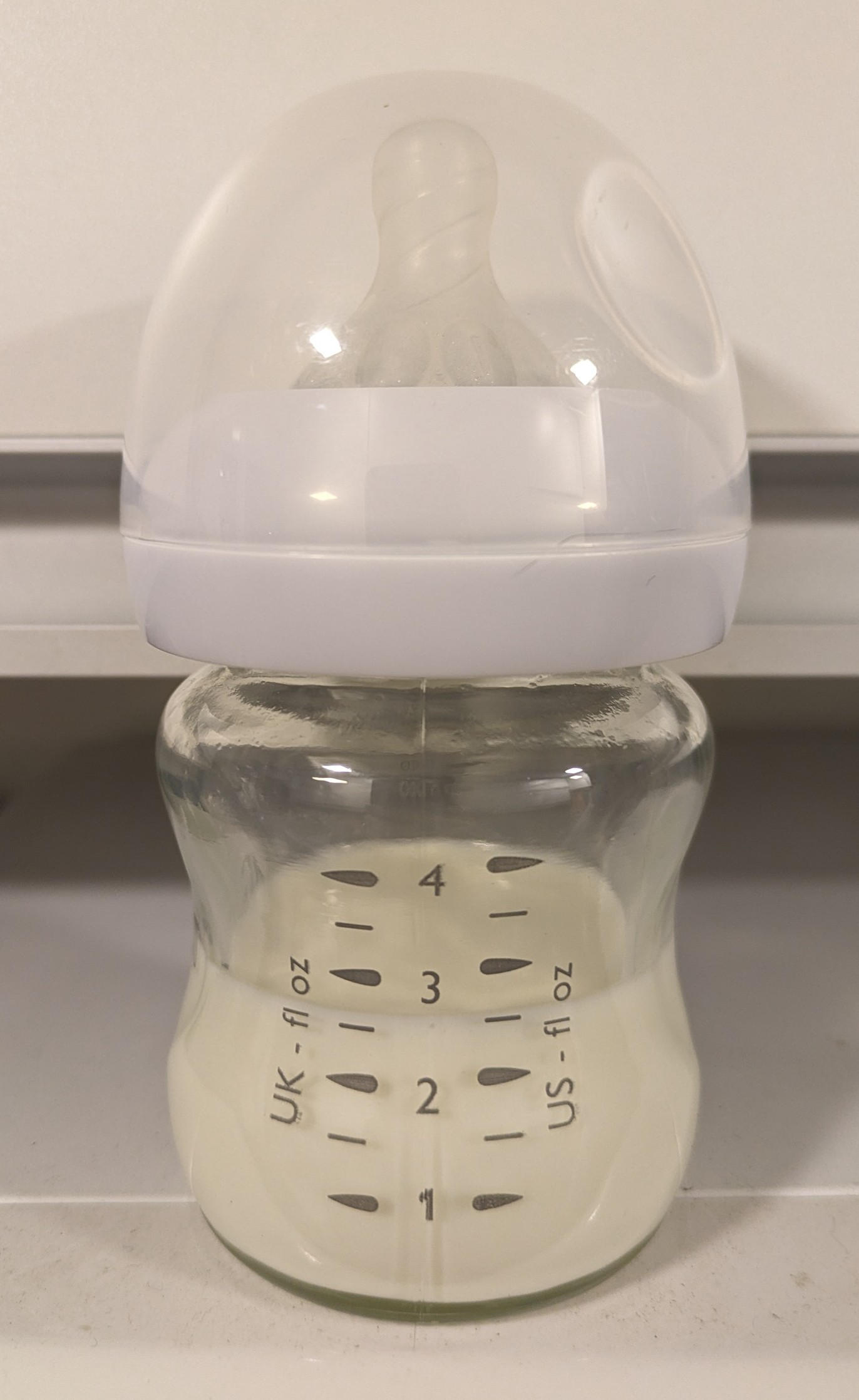
- A baby bottle in both American and imperial fluid ounces

General information
- Unit system: Imperial units, US customary units
- Unit of: Volume
- Symbol: fl oz

Conversions (imperial)
1 imp fl oz in ...	... is equal to ...
- SI units: 28.41306 cm^{3}
- US customary units: 0.9607599 US fl oz

Conversions (US)
1 US fl oz in ...	... is equal to ...
- SI units: 29.57353 cm^{3}
- Imperial units: 1.040843 imp fl oz

A fluid ounce (abbreviated fl oz, fl. oz. or oz. fl., old forms ℥, fl ℥, f℥, ƒ ℥) is a unit of volume (also called capacity) typically used for measuring liquids. The British Imperial, the United States customary, and the United States food labeling fluid ounce are the three that are still in common use, although various definitions have been used throughout history.

An imperial fluid ounce is 1/20 of an imperial pint, 1/160 of an imperial gallon, or exactly 28.4130625 mL.

A US customary fluid ounce is 1/16 of a US liquid pint, 1/128 of a US gallon, or exactly 29.5735295625 mL, making it about 4.084% larger than the imperial fluid ounce.

A US food labeling fluid ounce is exactly 30 mL.

== Comparison to the ounce ==
The fluid ounce is distinct from the (international avoirdupois) ounce as a unit of weight or mass, although it is sometimes referred to simply as an "ounce" where context makes the meaning clear (e.g., "ounces in a bottle"). A volume of pure water measuring one imperial fluid ounce has a mass of almost exactly one ounce.

== Definitions and equivalences ==
Imperial fluid ounce

1 imperial fluid ounce	=	1/160	imperial gallon
	=	1/40	imperial quart
	=	1/20	imperial pint
	=	1/10	imperial cup
	=	1/5	imperial gill
	=	8	imperial fluid drams
	≡	28.4130625	millilitres
	≈	1.7338715	cubic inches
	≈	0.96076	US fluid ounces
	≈	0.0258014	US dry quarts
	≈	0.0516028	US dry pints
	≈	the volume of 1 avoirdupois ounce of water

US customary fluid ounce

1 US fluid ounce	=	1/128	US gallon
	=	1/32	US liquid quart
	≡	1/16	US liquid pint
	=	1/8	US cup
	=	1/4	US gill
	=	2	US tablespoons
	=	6	US teaspoons
	=	8	US fluid drams
	=	29.5735295625	millilitres
	=	1.8046875	cubic inches
	≈	1.0408427	imperial fluid ounces
	≡	5775/215042	US dry quart
	≡	5775/107521	US dry pint
	≈	the volume of 1.0431756 avoirdupois ounces of water

US food labeling fluid ounce

For serving sizes on nutrition labels in the US, regulation 21 CFR §101.9(b) requires the use of "common household measures", and 21 CFR §101.9(b)(5)(viii) defines a "common household" fluid ounce as exactly 30 milliliters. This applies to the serving size but not the package size; package sizes use the US customary fluid ounce.

30 millilitres	≈	1.055852	imperial fluid ounces
	≈	1.014421	US customary fluid ounces
	≈	1.830712	cubic inches

== History ==
The fluid ounce was originally the volume occupied by one ounce of some substance, for example wine (in England) or water (in Scotland). The ounce in question also varied depending on the system of fluid measure, such as that used for wine versus ale.

Various ounces were used over the centuries, including the Tower ounce, troy ounce, avoirdupois ounce, and ounces used in international trade, such as Paris troy, a situation further complicated by the medieval practice of "allowances", whereby a unit of measure was not necessarily equal to the sum of its parts. For example, the 364-pound woolsack (165 kg) had a 14-pound allowance (6.4 kg) for the weight of the sack and other packaging materials.

In 1824, the British Parliament defined the imperial gallon as the volume of ten pounds of water at standard temperature. The gallon was divided into four quarts, the quart into two pints, the pint into four gills, and the gill into five ounces; thus, there were 160 imperial fluid ounces to the gallon.

This made the mass of a fluid ounce of water one avoirdupois ounce (28.35 g), a relationship which remains approximately valid today despite the imperial gallon's definition being slightly revised to be 4.54609 litres (thus making the imperial fluid ounce exactly 28.4130625 mL).

The US fluid ounce is based on the US gallon, which in turn is based on the wine gallon of 231 cubic inches that was used in the United Kingdom prior to 1824. With the adoption of the international inch, the US fluid ounce became 1/128 gal × 231 in^{3}/gal × (2.54 cm/in)^{3} = 29.5735295625 mL exactly, or about 4.084% larger than the imperial unit.

In the U.K., the use of the fluid ounce as a measurement in trade, public health, and public administration was circumscribed to a few specific uses (the labelling of beer, cider, water, lemonade and fruit juice in returnable containers) in 1995, and abolished entirely in 2000, by The Units of Measurement Regulations 1994.
