= Pint =

Unit of volume in the imperial and US systems

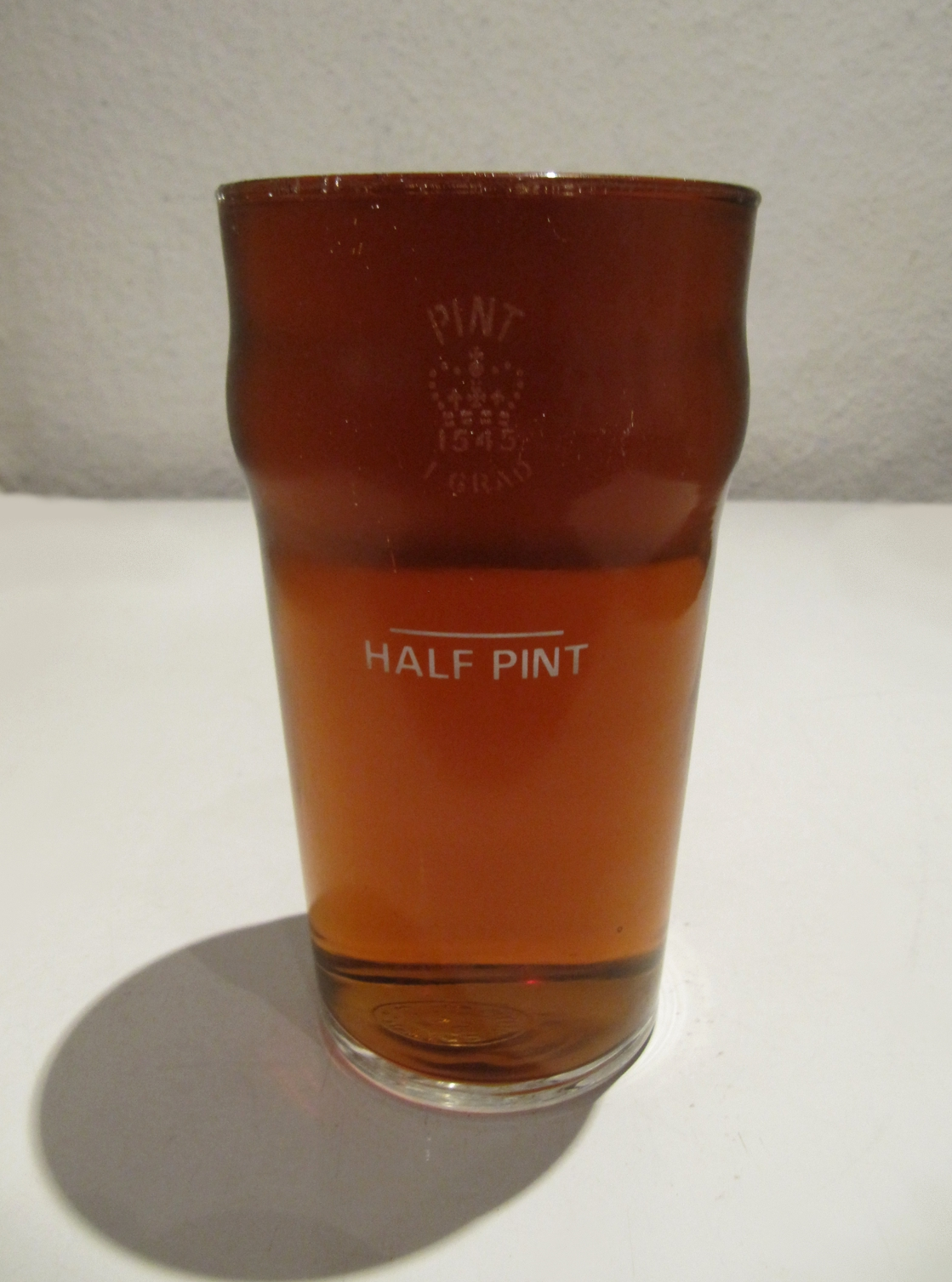
- A full pint glass. The fill line indicates a half pint.

General information
- Unit of: volume
- Symbol: pt, p

Conversions (imperial)
1 imp pt in ...	... is equal to ...
- Non-SI units: 568.2613 mL

Conversions (US)
1 US pt in ...	... is equal to ...
- Non-SI units: 473.1765 mL (liquid)
- Non-SI units: 550.6105 mL (dry)

The pint (/ˈpaɪnt/,; symbol pt, sometimes abbreviated as p) is a unit of volume or capacity in both the imperial and United States customary measurement systems. In both of those systems, it is one-eighth of a gallon.

The British imperial pint is 20.095% larger than the US pint because the two systems are defined differently as the British completely reorganized and defined the current imperial system in 1824 whereas the US system is derived from earlier English unit systems. Almost all other countries have standardized on the metric system, so although several still have units called pints or are otherwise based on ounces (such as for beverages), the volume varies by regional custom.

The imperial pint (≈ 568 mL) is used in the United Kingdom, other Commonwealth countries and Ireland. In the United States, two kinds of pint are used: a liquid pint (≈ 473 mL) and a less common dry pint (≈ 551 mL).

Other former British colonies, such as Australia, South Africa and New Zealand, converted to the metric system in the 1960s and 1970s, so while the term pint may still be in common use in these countries, it may no longer refer to the British imperial pint once used throughout the British Empire.

== Name ==
Pint comes from the Old French word pinte and perhaps ultimately from Vulgar Latin pincta meaning "painted", for marks painted on the side of a container to show capacity.

In France, the French word pinte is now used to describe a half-litre, slightly smaller than an Imperial pint, but in Canadian French it is used to describe an Imperial quart and the French word chopine is used for an Imperial pint.

== Definitions ==
=== Imperial pint ===
The imperial pint is equal to one-eighth of an imperial gallon of exactly 4.54609 L, i.e. 568.26125 millilitres.

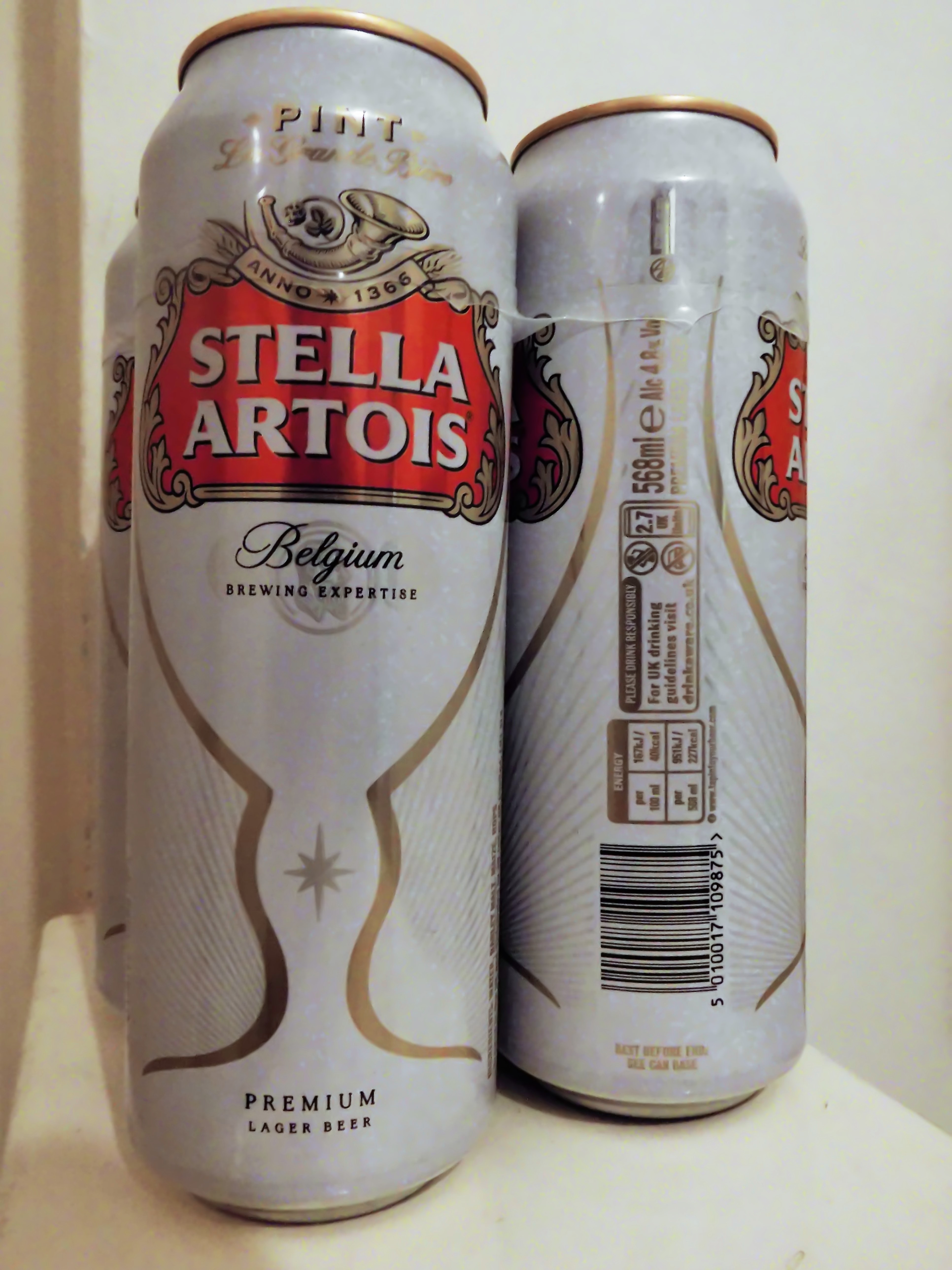
Imperial pint cans (568 mL) commonly found in British supermarkets

1 imperial pint	≡	1/8	imperial gallon
	≡	1/2	imperial quart
	≡	4	imperial gills
	≡	20	imperial fluid ounces
	≡	568.26125	millilitres (Note: After the 1976 (UK), c. 1964 (Canada), redefinition of the imperial gallon)
	≈	34.6774291	cubic inches
	≈	0.15011874	US gallons
	≈	0.600475	US liquid quarts
	≈	1.20095	US liquid pints
	≈	4.8038	US gills
	≈	19.2152	US fluid ounces
	≈	0.5160284	US dry quarts
	≈	1.0320567	US dry pints
	≈	the volume of 20 oz (567 g) of water at 62 °F (16.7 °C)

=== US liquid pint ===
In the United States, traditional length and volume measures have been legally standardized for commerce by the international yard and pound agreement of 1959, using the definition of 1 yard as 0.9144 meters: from this definition, the metric equivalents for inches, feet, miles, area measures, and measures of volume are determined.

The liquid pint is legally defined as one-eighth of a gallon of exactly 231 cubic inches, i.e. 28.875 cubic inches or 473.176473 millilitres.

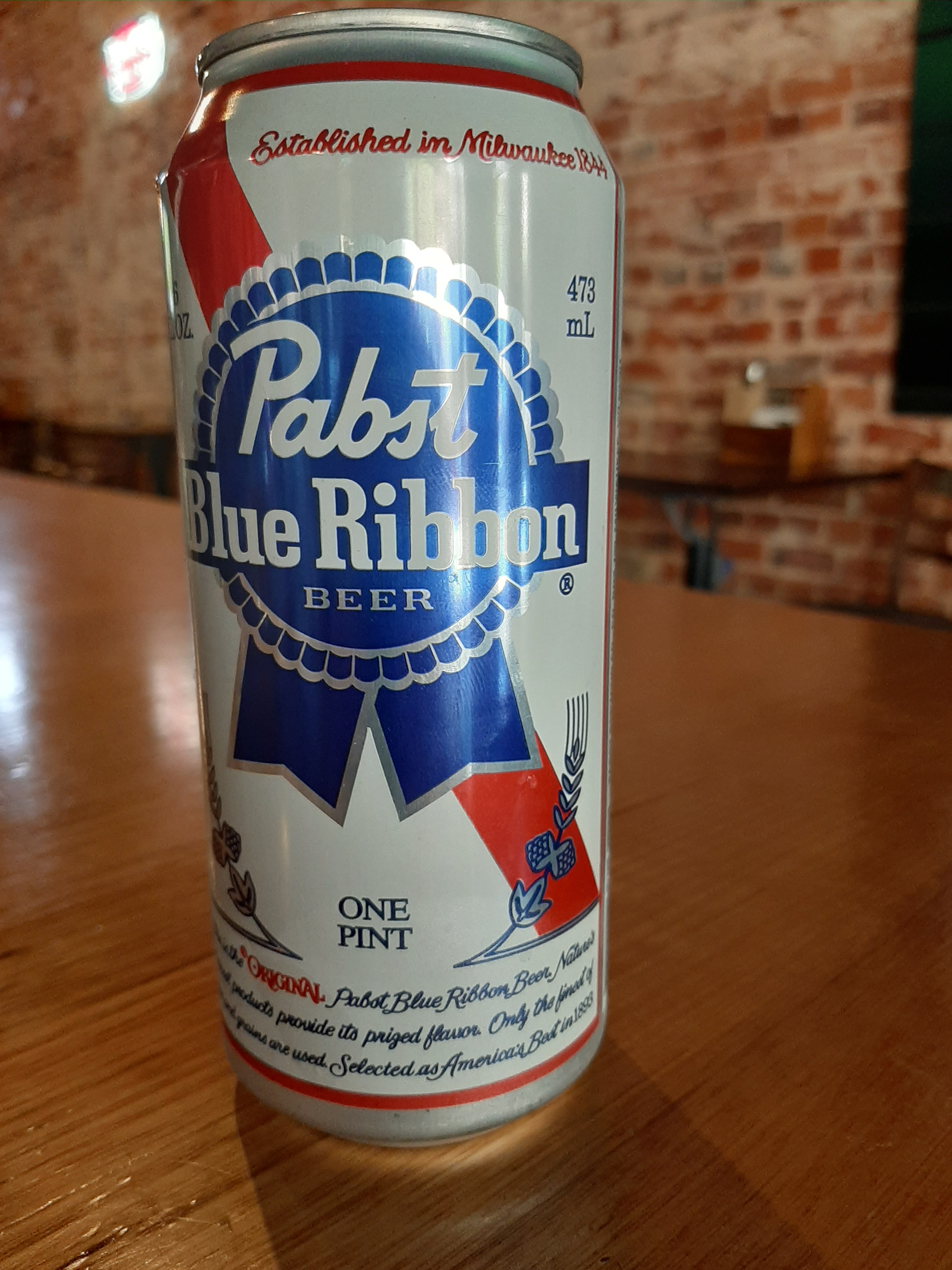
US pint can, also marked 473 mL

1 US liquid pint	≡	1/8	US gallon
	≡	1/2	US liquid quart
	≡	2	US cups
	≡	4	US gills
	≡	16	US fluid ounces
	≡	28.875	cubic inches
	≡	473.176473	millilitres (Note: After the 1964 redefinition of the litre and the 1959 redefinition of the inch)
	≈	0.1040843	imperial gallons
	≈	0.4163371	imperial quarts
	≈	0.8326742	imperial pints
	≈	3.3306967	imperial gills
	≈	16.6534837	imperial fluid ounces
	≡	46200/107521	US dry quart
	≡	92400/107521	US dry pint
	≈	the volume of 16.6534837 oz (472.11832 g) of water at 62 °F (16.7 °C)

=== US dry pint ===
In the United States, the dry pint is equal to 1/64 of a US bushel of exactly 2150.42 cubic inches, i.e. 33.6003125 cubic inches or 550.6104713575 milliltres.

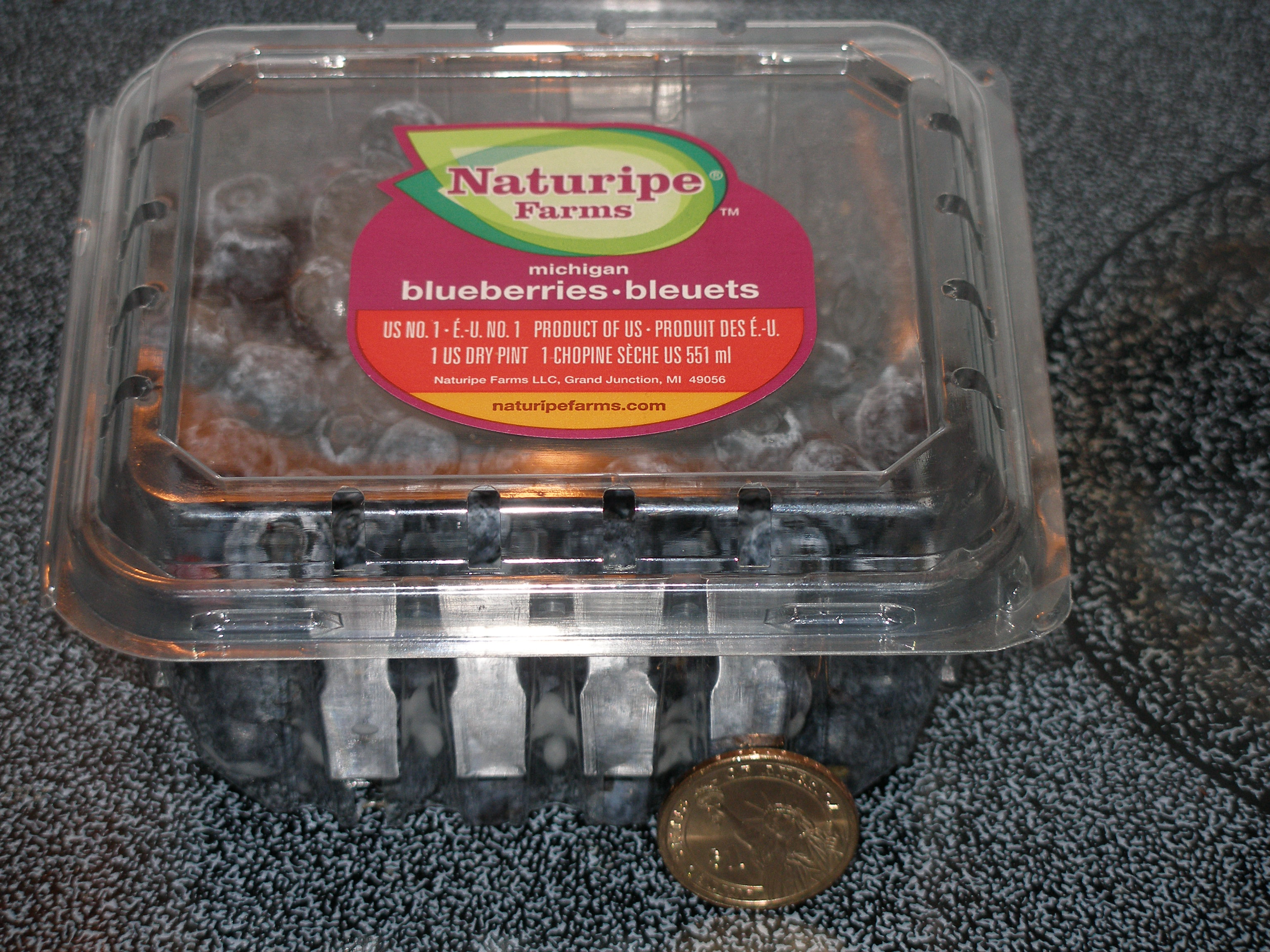
Blueberries labelled in English ("1 US dry pint") and French ("1 chopine sèche US 551 mL") for sale in the US and Canada

1 US dry pint
1 US dry pint	≡	1/64 US bushel
1 US dry pint	≡	1/16 US peck
1 US dry pint	≡	1/2 US dry quart
1 US dry pint	≡	33.6003125 cubic inches
1 US dry pint	≡	550.6104713575 milliltres
1 US dry pint	≡	107521/739200 US gallon
1 US dry pint	≡	107521/184800 US liquid quart
1 US dry pint	≡	1 15121/92400 US liquid pints
1 US dry pint	≡	4 15121/23100 US gills
1 US dry pint	≡	18 3571/5775 US fluid ounces
1 US dry pint	≈	0.1211174 imperial gallons
1 US dry pint	≈	0.4844695 imperial quarts
1 US dry pint	≈	0.968939 imperial pints
1 US dry pint	≈	3.8757559 imperial gills
1 US dry pint	≈	19.3787794 imperial fluid ounces
1 US dry pint	≈	the volume of 19.3787794 oz (549.37915 g) of water at 62 °F (16.7 °C)

=== Other pints ===
Different versions of the pint
Type	Definition	Equals	Comment
Flemish pintje		250 mL	
India	330 mL	330 mL	'Pint bottle' capacity.
South Australian pint	425 mL	425 mL	Known in the rest of Australia as a schooner
Australian pint	568 mL	568 mL	Based on the imperial pint rounded to a metric value.
Royal pint or pinte du roi	48 French cubic inches	≈ 952 mL	Varied by region from 0.95 to over 2 litres.
Canadian pinte de bière (only in French)	Imperial quart	≈ 1136 mL	
Scottish pint or joug (obsolete)	3 lb 7 oz Scots of water	≈ 1696 mL	

The Scottish pint or joug, an obsolete Scottish unit, is equal to 1696 mL (2.93 Imperial pints). It remained in use until 1826, surviving significantly longer than most other old Scottish measurements.

The word pint is one of numerous false friends between English and French. They are not the same unit although they have the same linguistic origin. The French word pinte is etymologically related, but historically described a larger unit. The Royal pint (pinte du roi) was 48 French cubic inches (952.1 mL), but regional pints varied in size depending on locality and on commodity (usually wine or olive oil) varying from 0.95 L to over 2 L.

In Canada, the Weights and Measures Act (R.S. 1985) defines a pint in English as one eighth of a gallon, but defines a pinte in French as one quarter of a gallon. (Note: The site Measurement Canada contains a wealth of documentation on official Canadian measurements. The French language version of the site is Mesures Canada.) Thus, if "a pint of beer" is ordered in English, servers are legally required to serve an imperial pint (568 mL) of beer, but under the federal Act, "une pinte de bière" legally refers to the larger imperial quart (1136 mL), while an imperial pint is designated as une chopine. However, in practice and according to Quebec’s Board of the French Language, une pinte commonly refers to the same 568 mL imperial pint as in English.

In Flanders, the word pintje, meaning 'little pint', refers only to a 250 mL glass of lager. Some West- and East-Flemish dialects use it as a word for beaker. The equivalent word in German, Pintchen, refers to a glass of a third of a litre in Cologne and the Rhineland.

In South Australia, ordering "a pint of beer" results in 425 mL (15 fl oz) being served. Customers must specifically request "an Imperial pint of beer" to get 570 mL (20 fl oz). Australians from other states often contest the size of their beers in Adelaide.

== Equivalence ==
One US liquid pint of water weighs 1.043 pounds (16.69 oz), which gives rise to an American saying: "A pint's a pound the world around".

However, the statement does not hold around the world, because the British imperial pint, which was also the standard measure in Britain's former colonies – such as Ireland, Canada, Australia, India, Malaysia, New Zealand and South Africa – weighs 1.253 pounds (20.05 oz). This prompted the Society for the Diffusion of Useful Knowledge to coin a saying for use in Commonwealth countries: "a pint of pure water weighs a pound and a quarter".

== History ==
The pint is traditionally one eighth of a gallon. In the Latin of the apothecaries' system, the symbol O (octarius or octavius; plural octarii or octavii – reflecting the "eighth" concept in its octa- syllable) was used for the pint. Because of the many historical definitions of a gallon, there have been many definitions of the pint.

Britain's North American colonies adopted the British wine gallon, defined in 1707 as exactly 231 cubic inches (3 in × 7 in × 11 in) as their basic liquid measure, from which the US wet pint is derived, and the British corn gallon (1/8 of a standard "Winchester" bushel of corn, or exactly 268.8025 cubic inches) as its dry measure, from which the US dry pint is derived.

In 1824, the British parliament replaced all the various gallons with a new imperial gallon based on ten pounds of distilled water at 62 °F (16.7 °C) (≈ 277.41943 cubic inches), from which the current imperial pint is derived.

The various Canadian provinces continued to use the wine gallon as a basis for their pint until 1873, well after Britain adopted the imperial system in 1824, while the traditional French pinte used in Lower Canada (Quebec) was twice the size of the traditional English pint used in Upper Canada (Ontario). After four of the British provinces united in the Canadian Confederation in 1867, Canada legally adopted the British imperial system of measure in 1873.

In 1873, the French Canadian pinte was defined as being one imperial quart or two imperial pints, while the imperial pint was legally called a chopine in French Canada. While the imperial pint, quart, and gallon are still legal units of measure in Canada, they are 20.095% larger than their American counterparts.

Historically, units called a pint (or the equivalent in the local language) were used across much of Europe, with values varying between countries from less than half a litre to over one litre. Within continental Europe, these pints were replaced with liquid measures based on the metric system during the 19th century. The term is still in limited use in parts of France and Central Europe, notably some areas of Germany and Switzerland, where ein Schoppen is colloquially used for half a litre. In Spanish holiday resorts frequented by British tourists, 'pint' is often taken to mean a beer glass (especially a dimple mug). Half-pint 285 mL, and pint mugs, 570 mL, may therefore be referred to as media jarra ('half jar/jug') and jarra (grande)('large jar/jug').

=== Effects of metrication ===
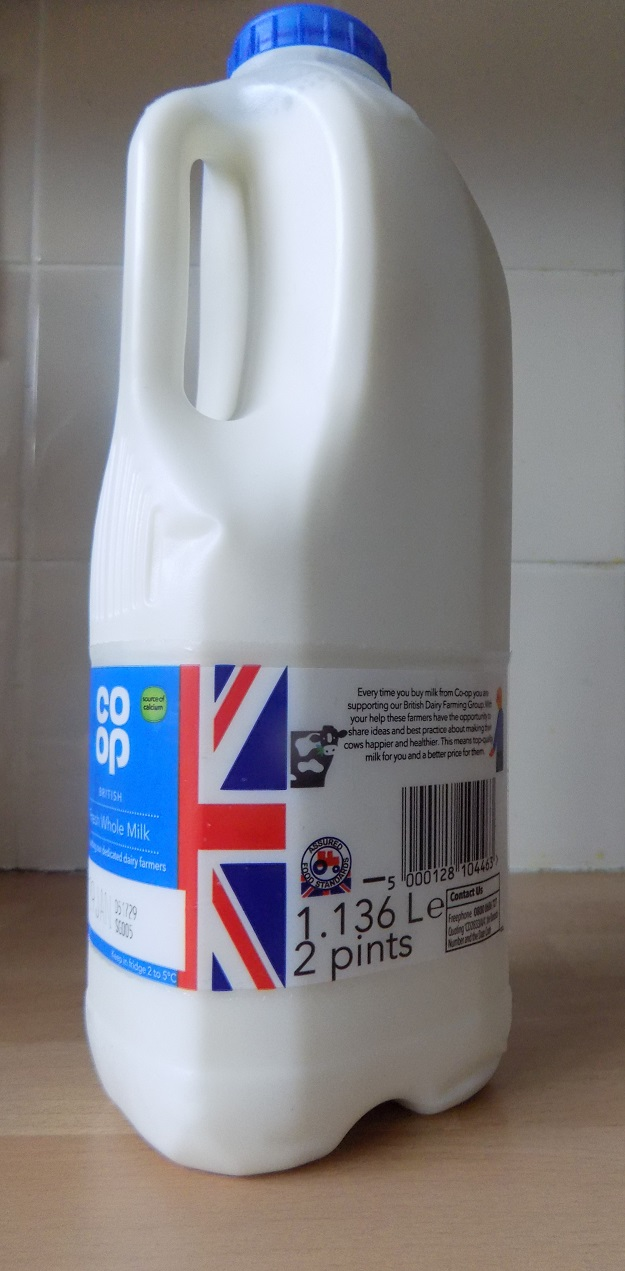
Pints are commonly used for the sale of milk in the United Kingdom. The label gives both the metric and the imperial volume.

In the British and Irish metrication processes, the pint was replaced by metric units as the legally defined primary unit of measure for trading by volume or capacity, except for the sale of draught beer and cider, and milk in returnable containers. As a supplementary unit, the pint can still be used in those countries in all circumstances. UK legislation mandates that draught beer and cider must be sold in one-third of a pint, two-thirds of a pint, or multiples of half a pint, which must be served in stamped, measured glasses or from government-stamped meters. Milk, in returnable containers, may come in pints without the metric equivalent stated. However, all other goods apart from the aforementioned exceptions must be sold or labelled in metric units. Milk in plastic containers mostly comes in multiples of 1 pint, but they are required to display the metric equivalent on packaging. Filtered milk and UHT milk sold in the UK is commonly sold in multiples of 1 litre bottles or containers. Recipes published in the UK and Ireland would have given ingredient quantities in imperial, where the pint is used as a unit for larger liquid quantities, as well as the metric measure – though recipes written now are more likely to use metric units.

In Australia and New Zealand, a subtle change was made to one pint milk bottles during the conversion from imperial to metric in the 1970s: the height and diameter of the milk bottle remained unchanged, so that existing equipment for handling and storing the bottles was unaffected, but the shape was adjusted to increase the capacity from 568 mL to 600 mL, a conveniently rounded metric measure. Such milk bottles are no longer officially referred to as pints. However, the "pint glass" in pubs in Australia remains closer to the standard imperial pint, at 570 mL. It holds about 500 mL of beer and about 70 mL of froth, except in South Australia, where a pint is served in a 425 mL glass and a 570 mL glass is called an "imperial pint".

In New Zealand, there is no longer any legal requirement for beer to be served in standard measures: in pubs, the largest size of glass, which is referred to as a pint, varies, but usually contains 425 mL.

After metrication in Canada, milk and other liquids in pre-packaged containers came in metric sizes so conversion issues could no longer arise. Draft beer in Canada, when advertised as a "pint", is legally required to be an imperial pint (568 mL). With the allowed margin of error of 0.5 fluid ounces, a "pint" that is less than 554 mL of beer is an offence, though this regulation is often violated and rarely enforced. To avoid legal issues, many drinking establishments are moving away from using the term "pint" and are selling "glasses" or "sleeves" of beer, neither of which has a legal definition.

A 375 mL bottle of liquor in the US and the Canadian maritime provinces is sometimes referred to as a "pint" and a 200 mL bottle is called a "half-pint", harking back to the days when liquor came in US pints, fifths, quarts, and half-gallons. Liquor in the US has been sold in metric sized bottles since 1980, although beer is still sold in US traditional units.

In France, a standard 250 mL measure of beer is known as un demi ("a half"), originally meaning a half-pint.
