= Dan (mass) =

Traditional Chinese unit for weight

Dan (simplified Chinese: 担; traditional Chinese: 擔; pinyin: dàn), (Note: Formerly, the Chinese measure word 擔/担 was also written as 石 (pronounced "shi" or "dan")) or Daam in Cantonese, Tan in Japanese and Taiwanese, also called "Chinese hundredweight" or "picul", (Note: "Picul" is an English translation of Chinese word "擔" (dàn) according to its sounds in Malay "pikul", before Pinyin and Jyutping were available.) is a traditional Chinese unit for weight measurement in East Asia. It originated in China before being introduced to neighboring countries. Nowaday, the mass of 1 dan equals 100 jin or 50 kg in mainland China, 60 kg in Taiwan and Japan, and 60.478982 kg in Hong Kong, Singapore and Malaysia. Dan is mostly used in the traditional markets.

== China Mainland ==
On June 25, 1959, the State Council of the People's Republic of China issued the Order on the Unified Measurement System, with minor amendment to the market system. "

Table of mass units in the People's Republic of China since 1959
Pinyin	Character	Relative value	Metric value	Imperial value	Notes
lí	市厘	1/10000	50 mg	0.001764 oz	cash
fēn	市分	1/1000	500 mg	0.01764 oz	candareen
qián	市錢	1/100	5 g	0.1764 oz	mace or Chinese dram
liǎng	市兩	1/10	50 g	1.764 oz	tael or Chinese ounce
jīn	市斤	1	500 g	1.102 lb	catty or Chinese pound formerly 16 liang = 1 jin
dàn	市擔	100	50 kg	110.2 lb	picul or Chinese hundredweight

Legally, 1 dan equals 100 jins, 50 kg, or 110.2 lb.

== Taiwan ==
The so-called Taiwan dan is actually the dan used throughout China during the Qing Dynasty. 1 Taiwan dan is 60 kg, equal to 100 Taiwan jin.

Table of units of mass in Taiwan
Unit				Relative value	Metric		US & Imperial		Notes
Taiwanese Hokkien	Hakka	Mandarin	Character	Relative value	Legal	Decimal	Exact	Approx.	Notes
Lî	Lî	Lí	釐	1/1000	3/80,000 kg	37.5 mg	3750/45,359,237 lb	0.5787 gr	Cash; Same as Japanese Rin
Hun	Fûn	Fēn	分	1/100	3/8000 kg	375 mg	37,500/45,359,237 lb	5.787 gr	Candareen; Same as Japanese Fun
Chîⁿ	Chhièn	Qián	錢	1/10	3/800 kg	3.75 g	375,000/45,359,237 lb	2.116 dr	Mace; Same as Japanese Momme (匁)
Niú	Liông	Liǎng	兩	1	3/80 kg	37.5 g	3,750,000/45,359,237 lb	21.16 dr	Tael
Kin/Kun	Kîn	Jīn	斤	16	3/5 kg	600 g	60,000,000/45,359,237 lb	1.323 lb	Catty; Same as Japanese Kin
Tàⁿ	Tâm	Dàn	擔	1600	60 kg		6,000,000,000/45,359,237 lb	132.3 lb	Picul; Same as Japanese Tan

== Hong Kong and Macau ==
Hong Kong law stipulates that one dan is equal to one hundred jin , which is 60.478982 kg.

Table of Chinese mass units in Hong Kong and Macau
Jyutping	Character	English	Portuguese	Relative value	Relation to the Traditional Chinese Units (Macau)	Metric value	Imperial value	Notes
lei4	厘	li, cash	liz	1/16000	1/10 condorim	37.79931 mg	0.02133 dr	
fan1	分	fen, candareen (fan)	condorim	1/1600	1/10 maz	377.9936375 mg	0.2133 dr	
cin4	錢	qian, mace (tsin)	maz	1/160	1/10 tael	3.779936375 g	2.1333 dr	
loeng2	兩	liang, leung, tael	tael	1/16	1/16 cate	37.79936375 g	1.3333 oz	604.78982/16=37.79936375
gan1	斤	jin, kan, catty	cate	1	1/100 pico	604.78982 g	1.3333 lb	Hong Kong and Macau share the definition.
daam3	擔	dan, tam, picul	pico	100	None	60.478982 kg	133.3333 lb	Hong Kong and Macau share the definition.

Singapore and Malaysia have similar regulations as Hong Kong, as they are all former British colonies.

== Japan ==
In Japan, 1 dan, or tan in Japanese pronunciation, is equal to 60 kg.

Table of units of mass
Unit		Kan	Metric		US & Imperial	
Romanised	Kanji	Kan	Legal	Decimal	Exact	Approx.
Mō	毛 or 毫	1/1,000,000	3/800,000 kg	3.75 mg	375/45,359,237 lb	8.267 μlb
Rin	厘	1/100,000	3/80,000 kg	37.5 mg	3750/45,359,237 lb	0.5787 gr
Fun	分	1/10,000	3/8000 kg	375 mg	37,500/45,359,237 lb	5.787 gr
Momme; Monme	匁	1/1000	3/800 kg	3.75 g	375,000/45,359,237 lb	2.116 dr
Hyakume	百目	1/10	3/8 kg	375 g	37,500,000/45,359,237 lb	13.23 oz
Kin	斤	4/25	3/5 kg	600 g	60,000,000/45,359,237 lb	1.323 lb
Kan(me) (Note: The kan is also sometimes known in English as the kwan.)	貫(目)	1	15/4 kg	3.75 kg	375,000,000/45,359,237 lb	8.267 lb
Maru	丸	8	30 kg		3,000,000,000/45,359,237 lb	66.14 lb
Tan	担 or 擔	16	60 kg		6,000,000,000/45,359,237 lb	132.3 lb
Notes: Exact figures follow the 1891 Law of Weights & Measures and 1959 International Yard and Pound Agreement.; Metric values are exact. US & imperial approximations are rounded to four significant figures.

== See also ==
- Chinese units of measurement
- Hong Kong units of measurement
- Taiwanese units of measurement
- Japanese units of measurement

== Sources ==
- Nagase-Reimer, Keiko (2016), Copper in the Early Modern Sino-Japanese Trade, Monies, Markets, and Finance in East Asia, 1600–1900, Vol. VII, Leiden: Brill, ISBN 9789004304512
- "Japanese Weights, Measures, and Moneys", Handbook on Japanese Military Forces, Technical Manual E 30–480, Washington: US War Department, 1944, p. 400–1, ISBN 9780807164464, reprinted by the Louisiana State University Press at Baton Rouge in 1991.
