= Qian (mass) =

Traditional Chinese unit for weight

Qian (simplified Chinese: 钱; traditional Chinese: 錢; pinyin: qián), called tsin (cin4) in Cantonese, tiền or đồng in Vietnamese, or "Chinese ounce" or "mace" (Note: "mace" is either (i) a borrowing from Dutch, or (ii) a borrowing from Malay, both were translation of the Chinese measure word "兩" before Pinyin and Jyutping were available for direct transcription.) in English, is a traditional Chinese unit for weight measurement. It originated in China before being introduced to neighboring countries in East Asia. Nowaday, the mass of 1 qian equals 5 grams in mainland China, 3.75 grams in Taiwan, 3.7799 grams in Hong Kong, Singapore and Malaysia, and 3.78 grams in Vietnam.

Qian is mostly used in the traditional markets, and famous for measuring gold, silver and Chinese medicines.

In Japan, the equivalent mass unit to the qian is the momme.

== China Mainland ==
On June 25, 1959, the State Council of the People's Republic of China issued the "Order on the Unified Measurement System", retaining the market measure system, with minor amendment.

Table of mass units in the People's Republic of China since 1959
Pinyin	Character	Relative value	Metric value	Imperial value	Notes
lí	市厘	1/10000	50 mg	0.001764 oz	cash
fēn	市分	1/1000	500 mg	0.01764 oz	candareen
qián	市錢	1/100	5 g	0.1764 oz	mace or Chinese dram
liǎng	市兩	1/10	50 g	1.764 oz	tael or Chinese ounce
jīn	市斤	1	500 g	1.102 lb	catty or Chinese pound formerly 16 liang = 1 jin
dàn	市擔	100	50 kg	110.2 lb	picul or Chinese hundredweight

where 1 qian equals 5 grams, and 10 qiags equals 1 liang. The traditional Chinese medicine measurement system remains unchanged.

== Taiwan ==
In 1895, Taiwan was ceded to Japan from China. The Japanese implemented the metric system, but the Taiwanese still followed their own habits and continued to use the old weights and measures of the Qing Dynasty. 1 Taiwan qian is equal to 3.75 grams, or 1/10 Taiwan liang.

Table of units of mass in Taiwan
Unit				Relative value	Metric		US & Imperial		Notes
Taiwanese Hokkien	Hakka	Mandarin	Character	Relative value	Legal	Decimal	Exact	Approx.	Notes
Lî	Lî	Lí	釐	1/1000	3/80,000 kg	37.5 mg	3750/45,359,237 lb	0.5787 gr	Cash; Same as Japanese Rin
Hun	Fûn	Fēn	分	1/100	3/8000 kg	375 mg	37,500/45,359,237 lb	5.787 gr	Candareen; Same as Japanese Fun
Chîⁿ	Chhièn	Qián	錢	1/10	3/800 kg	3.75 g	375,000/45,359,237 lb	2.116 dr	Mace; Same as Japanese Momme (匁)
Niú	Liông	Liǎng	兩	1	3/80 kg	37.5 g	3,750,000/45,359,237 lb	21.16 dr	Tael
Kin/Kun	Kîn	Jīn	斤	16	3/5 kg	600 g	60,000,000/45,359,237 lb	1.323 lb	Catty; Same as Japanese Kin
Tàⁿ	Tâm	Dàn	擔	1600	60 kg		6,000,000,000/45,359,237 lb	132.3 lb	Picul; Same as Japanese Tan

== Hong Kong and Macau ==
=== Hong Kong and Macau mass units ===
Currently, Hong Kong law stipulates that one qian is equal to 1/10 liang, which is 3.779936375 grams.

Table of Chinese mass units in Hong Kong and Macau
Jyutping	Character	English	Portuguese	Relative value	Relation to the Traditional Chinese Units (Macau)	Metric value	Imperial value	Notes
lei4	厘	li (cash)	liz	1/16000	1/10 condorim	37.79931 mg	0.02133 dr	
fan1	分	fen (candareen, fan)	condorim	1/1600	1/10 maz	377.9936375 mg	0.2133 dr	
cin4	錢	qian (mace, tsin)	maz	1/160	1/10 tael	3.779936375 g	2.1333 dr	
loeng2	兩	liang (leung, tael)	tael	1/16	1/16 cate	37.79936375 g	1.3333 oz	604.78982/16=37.79936375
gan1	斤	jin (gan, catty)	cate	1	1/100 pico	604.78982 g	1.3333 lb	Hong Kong and Macau share the definition.
daam3	擔	dan (tam, dan)	pico	100	None	60.478982 kg	133.3333 lb	Hong Kong and Macau share the definition.

Similarly, Singapore law stipulates that one qian equals 3.7799 g. Malaysia has the same regulations as it is a former British colony as well.

=== Hong Kong troy units ===
These are used for trading precious metals such as gold and silver.

Table of mass (Hong Kong troy) units
English	Character	Relative value	Metric value	Imperial value	Notes
fen (candareen) troy	金衡分	1/100	374.29 mg	0.096 drt	
qian (mace) troy	金衡錢	1/10	3.7429 g	0.96 drt	
liang (tael) troy	金衡兩	1	37.429 g	1.2 ozt	

== Vietnam ==
In Vietnam, the unit of qian is called "đồng or tiền": 1 đồng is equal to 3.78 grams or 10 phân by traditional value.

Early 20th-century units of weight
Name in Chữ Quốc ngữ	Hán/Nôm name	Traditional value	Traditional conversion	Modern value	Modern conversion
tấn	擯	604.5 kg	10 tạ	1 000 kg	10 tạ
quân		302.25 kg	5 tạ	500 kg	obsolete
tạ	榭	60.45 kg	10 yến	100 kg	10 yến
bình		30.225 kg	5 yến	50 kg	obsolete
yến		6.045 kg	10 cân	10 kg	10 cân
cân	斤	604.5 g	16 lạng	1 kg	10 lạng
nén		378 g	10 lạng		
lạng	兩	37.8 g	10 đồng	100 g	
đồng or tiền	錢	3.78 g	10 phân		
phân	分	0.38 g	10 ly		
ly or li	厘	37.8 mg	10 hào		
hào	毫	3.8 mg	10 ti		
ti	絲	0.4 mg	10 hốt		
hốt	忽	0.04 mg	10 vi		
vi	微	0.004 mg			

For more information on the Chinese mass measurement system, please see article Jin (mass).

== See also ==
- Chinese units of measurement
- Hong Kong units of measurement
- Taiwanese units of measurement
- Vietnamese units of measurement
