= Jin (mass) =

Traditional Chinese unit of weight

Catty
- Unit system: Chinese
- Unit of: Mass
- Symbol: 斤

Conversions
1 斤 in ...	... is equal to ...
- Mainland China: 0.5 kg
- Japan, Korea, Taiwan: 0.6 kg
- Vietnam: 0.6045 kg
- Hong Kong: 0.60478982 kg
- Malaysia: 0.60479 kg
- Singapore: 0.6048 kg

Conversions (imperial)
1 imp 斤 in ...	... is equal to ...
- Hong Kong, Malaysia, Singapore: 1 1/3 lb

Jin

Chinese name
- Chinese: 斤
Transcriptions
Standard Mandarin
- Hanyu Pinyin: jīn
- Wade–Giles: chin
Yue: Cantonese
- Yale Romanization: gàn
- Jyutping: gan1
Southern Min
- Hokkien POJ: kin; kun

Vietnamese name
- Vietnamese: cân

Korean name
- Hangul: 근
- Hanja: 斤
Transcriptions
- Revised Romanization: geun

Mongolian name
- Mongolian Cyrillic: жин
- Mongolian script: ᠵᠢᠩ
Transcriptions
- SASM/GNC: jing

Japanese name
- Kanji: 斤
- Hiragana: きん
Transcriptions
- Romanization: kin

Malay name
- Malay: kati

Manchu name
- Manchu script: ᡤᡳᠩᡤᡝᠨ
- Möllendorff: ginggen

The jin (Chinese: 斤; pinyin: jīn) (Note: Alternatively romanized as gan in Cantonese, kin in Taiwanese Hokkian and Japanese, and geun in Korean.) or catty (from Malay kati) is a traditional Chinese unit of mass used across East and Southeast Asia, notably for weighing food and other groceries. Related units include the picul (dan or shi), equal to 100 catties, and the tael (liang), which is 1/16 of a catty. The stone (also dan or shi) is a former unit used in Hong Kong equal to 120 catties, and a gwan (鈞) is 30 jin. The catty is still used in Southeast Asia as a unit of measurement in some contexts, especially by the significant Overseas Chinese populations across the region, particularly in Malaysia and Singapore.

The catty is traditionally equivalent to 1 1/3 pound avoirdupois, formalised as 604.78982 grams (g) in Hong Kong, 604.5 g (historically) in Vietnam, 604.79 g in Malaysia and 604.8 g in Singapore. In Taiwan, Japan and Korea, the unit is rounded to 600 g. In China, the jin is rounded to 500 g and called the market jin (市斤; shìjīn), to distinguish it from the kilogram (called the common jin; 公斤; gōngjīn), and is subdivided into 10 taels rather than 16.

== History ==
In ancient China, the office of Sima (司馬) was in charge of military affairs. Because the management of military grain and fodder involved frequent weighing, mass units (such as jin and liang) were also called sima jin (司馬斤), sima liang, and so on. The measuring tools used were called sima scales (司馬秤). This is still true in Hong Kong. One sima jin is equal to sixteen sima liang, which is where the idiom "half a jin vs eight liang" (Note: Idiom, 半斤八兩, (chiefly derogatory) six of one, half a dozen of the other; not much to choose between the two) comes from.

Jin size throughout Chinese history
Dynasty	Mass in grams
Pre-Qin	250
Qin	253
Western Han	248
Eastern Han, Three Kingdoms, Jin	220
Northern and Southern dynasties	Liang, Chen, West Liang: 220; Southern Qi: 330; Northern Wei, Northern Qi: 440; Northern Zhou: 660
Sui dynasty	661 (large system), 220 (small system)
Tang dynasty	661
Song dynasty, Yuan dynasty	633
Ming dynasty, Qing dynasty	590

The mass of the jin varies between different eras and regions, but its ratio to contemporaneous units is generally unchanged: one jin is equal to sixteen liang, or 1/120 of a dan. Starting from the late Qing dynasty, the jin was also written in English as catty or kan based on the Malay name for the unit.

Before the Qing dynasty, various regions and industries in China had their own weight standards for jin and liang. During the Qing, unified weights and measures were implemented. One late-Qing jin was 596.816 g according to the Beiyang government, and equal to 16 liang.

== China ==
=== 1915 measurement law ===
On 7 January 1915, the Beiyang government promulgated a measurement law to use the metric system as the standard but also a system based directly on Qing definitions (营造尺库平制), with the liang as the base unit.

Chinese mass units promulgated in 1915
Pinyin	Character	Relative value	Metric value	Imperial value	Notes
háo	毫	1/10000	3.7301 mg	0.0001316 oz	
lí	釐	1/1000	37.301 mg	0.001316 oz	cash
fēn	分	1/100	373.01 mg	0.01316 oz	candareen
qián	錢	1/10	3.7301 g	0.1316 oz	mace or Chinese dram
liǎng	兩	1	37.301 g	1.316 oz	tael or Chinese ounce
jīn	斤	16	596.816 g	1.316 lb	catty or Chinese pound

=== Mass units in the Republic of China (1930–1959) ===
Market-unit system
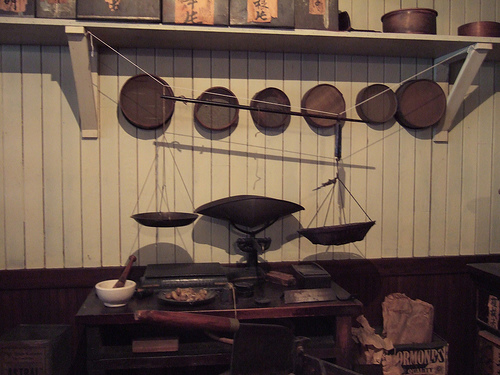
- A traditional Chinese scale
- Chinese: 市制
- Literal meaning: market system
Transcriptions
Standard Mandarin
- Hanyu Pinyin: shìzhì
- Wade–Giles: shih-chih

Alternative Chinese name
- Chinese: 市用制
- Literal meaning: market-use system
Transcriptions
Standard Mandarin
- Hanyu Pinyin: shìyòngzhì
- Wade–Giles: shih-yung-chih

On 16 February 1929, the Nationalist government adopted and promulgated The Weights and Measures Act to adopt the metric system and limit the updated Chinese units of measurement to private sales and trade, effective 1 January 1930. The updated market units are based on rounded metric numbers, and jin is the base unit.

Mass units in the Republic of China (1930–1959)
Pinyin	Character	Relative value	Metric value	Imperial value	Notes
sī	絲	1/1600000	312.5 μg	0.00001102 oz	
háo	毫	1/160000	3.125 mg	0.0001102 oz	
lí	市釐	1/16000	31.25 mg	0.001102 oz	cash
fēn	市分	1/1600	312.5 mg	0.01102 oz	candareen
qián	市錢	1/160	3.125 g	0.1102 oz	mace or Chinese dram
liǎng	市兩	1/16	31.25 g	1.102 oz	tael or Chinese ounce
jīn	市斤	1	500 g	1.102 lb	catty or Chinese pound
dàn	擔	100	50 kg	110.2 lb	picul or Chinese hundredweight

=== Mass units since 1959 ===
On June 25, 1959, the State Council of the People's Republic of China issued the Order on the Unified Measurement System, retaining the market system, with the statement of "the market system originally stated that sixteen liang is equal to one jin. Due to the trouble of conversion, it should be changed to ten liang per jin."

Chinese mass units since 1959
Pinyin	Hanzi	Relative value	Metric value	Imperial value	Notes
lí	市厘	1/10000	50 mg	0.001764 oz	cash
fēn	市分	1/1000	500 mg	0.01764 oz	candareen
qián	市錢	1/100	5 g	0.1764 oz	mace or Chinese dram
liǎng	市兩	1/10	50 g	1.764 oz	tael or Chinese ounce
jīn	市斤	1	500 g	1.102 lb	catty or Chinese pound
dàn	市擔	100	50 kg	110.2 lb	picul or Chinese hundredweight

Legally, 1 jin equals 500 grams, and 10 liang equals 1 jin (that is, 1 liang is 50 g). The traditional Chinese medicine measurement system was unchanged.

==== Mass units in traditional Chinese medicine ====
Until 1979, traditional Chinese medicine (TCM) generally kept the division of 16 liang to 1 (500-g) jin. In 1979, the State Council of China issued an order for the TCM trade to switch to metric units. The previously used qian was to be treated as exactly 3 g, with other units derived from the liang scaled accordingly. Mass units in ancient TCM prescriptions should be interpreted using the metric (gram) conversions appropriate for the era, not the modern versions of these units.

== Taiwan ==
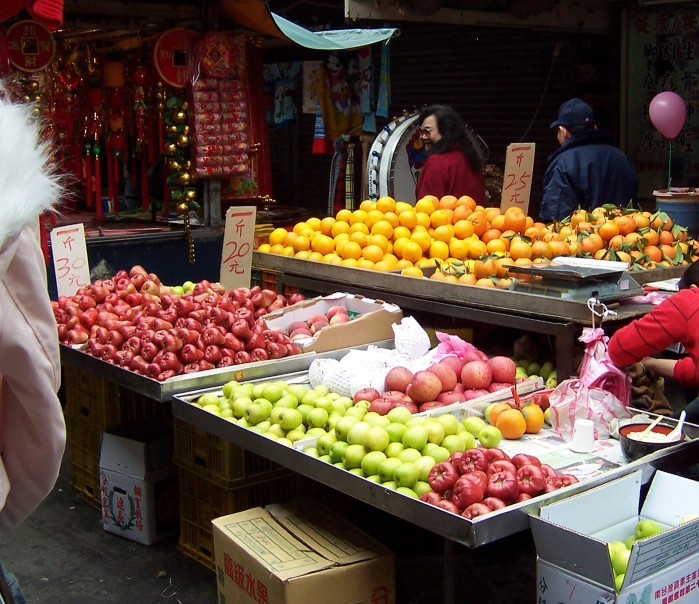
Fruits sold in jīn (斤) in a Taiwanese market

The jin, or kin, in Taiwan is called the Taiwan jin or taijin (台斤). The taijin is equivalent to the Qing-era Chinese jin. In 1895 Taiwan was ceded to Japan, which implemented the metric system, but Taiwan continued to use the old weights and measures. Thus, after China stopped using the Qing system, it came to be known as the Taiwan system. 1 taijin is 600 grams, or 16 Taiwan liang, and 1 Taiwan liang is equal to 37.5 g.

Taiwanese units of mass
Unit				Relative value	Metric		US & Imperial		Notes
Taiwanese Hokkien	Hakka	Mandarin	Character	Relative value	Legal	Decimal	Exact	Approx.	Notes
Lî	Lî	Lí	釐	1/1000	3/80,000 kg	37.5 mg	3750/45,359,237 lb	0.5787 gr	Cash; same as Japanese rin
Hun	Fûn	Fēn	分	1/100	3/8000 kg	375 mg	37,500/45,359,237 lb	5.787 gr	Candareen; same as Japanese fun
Chîⁿ	Chhièn	Qián	錢	1/10	3/800 kg	3.75 g	375,000/45,359,237 lb	2.116 dr	Mace; same as Japanese momme (匁)
Niú	Liông	Liǎng	兩	1	3/80 kg	37.5 g	3,750,000/45,359,237 lb	21.16 dr	Tael
Kin or chin	Kîn	Jīn	斤	16	3/5 kg	600 g	60,000,000/45,359,237 lb	1.323 lb	Catty; same as Japanese kin
Tàⁿ	Tâm	Dàn	擔	1600	60 kg		6,000,000,000/45,359,237 lb	132.3 lb	Picul; same as Japanese tan

== Hong Kong and Macau ==
=== Hong Kong and Macau mass units ===
According to the original Hong Kong law, Article 22 of 1884, one jīn is 1 1/3 British pounds (that is, 3 jīn is equal to 4 pounds). Currently, Hong Kong law stipulates that one jīn is equal to one hundredth of a dan or sixteen liang, which is 0.604 789 82 kilograms (0.604 789 82 kg divided by 4/3 is 0.453 592 65 kg, the 1878 definition of the British Avoirdupois pound).

Mass units in Hong Kong and Macau
Jyutping	Character	English	Portuguese	Relative value	Relation to next largest Chinese unit (Macau)	Metric value	Imperial value	Notes
lei4	厘	li, cash	liz	1/16000	1/10 condorim	37.79931 mg	0.02133 dr	
fan1	分	fen, candareen (fan)	condorim	1/1600	1/10 maz	377.9936375 mg	0.2133 dr	
cin4	錢	qian, mace (tsin)	maz	1/160	1/10 tael	3.779936375 g	2.1333 dr	
loeng2	兩	liang, leung, tael	tael	1/16	1/16 cate	37.79936375 g	1.3333 oz	604.78982 / 16 = 37.79936375
gan1	斤	jin, kan, catty	cate	1	1/100 pico	604.78982 g	1.3333 lb	Hong Kong and Macau share the definition
daam3	擔	dan, tam, picul	pico	100	None	60.478982 kg	133.3333 lb	Hong Kong and Macau share the definition

=== Hong Kong troy units ===
These are used for trading precious metals such as gold and silver, defined around the British troy weight system.

Hong Kong troy mass units
English name	Chinese name	Relative value	Metric value	Imperial value	Notes
fen (candareen) troy	金衡分	1/100	374.29 mg	0.096 drt	
qian (mace) troy	金衡錢	1/10	3.7429 g	0.96 drt	
liang (tael) troy	金衡兩	1	37.429 g	1.2 ozt	

== Malaysia and Singapore ==
Malaysia has similar regulations as Hong Kong, as it was also a former British colony. The rounding is slightly different, a catty (or jin) is 0.604 79 kg. Similarly, Singapore law stipulates that one catty is also equal to 1 1/3 pounds, or 0.6048 kg.

== Japan ==
Japanese units of mass
Unit		Kanji	Metric		US & Imperial	
Romanised	Kanji	Kanji	Legal	Decimal	Exact	Approx.
Mō	毛 or 毫	1/1,000,000	3/800,000 kg	3.75 mg	375/45,359,237 lb	8.267 μlb
Rin	厘	1/100,000	3/80,000 kg	37.5 mg	3750/45,359,237 lb	0.5787 gr
Fun	分	1/10,000	3/8000 kg	375 mg	37,500/45,359,237 lb	5.787 gr
Momme; Monme	匁	1/1000	3/800 kg	3.75 g	375,000/45,359,237 lb	2.116 dr
Hyakume	百目	1/10	3/8 kg	375 g	37,500,000/45,359,237 lb	13.23 oz
Kin	斤	4/25	3/5 kg	600 g	60,000,000/45,359,237 lb	1.323 lb
Kan(me)	貫(目)	1	15/4 kg	3.75 kg	375,000,000/45,359,237 lb	8.267 lb
Maru	丸	8	30 kg		3,000,000,000/45,359,237 lb	66.14 lb
Tan	担 or 擔	16	60 kg		6,000,000,000/45,359,237 lb	132.3 lb
Notes: Exact figures follow the 1891 Law of Weights & Measures and 1959 International Yard and Pound Agreement.; Metric values are exact. US and Imperial approximations are rounded to four significant figures.

In Japan, 1 jin, or kin in Japanese, is equal to 600 grams, but is rarely used. An exception is the jin used for slices of bread. According to the fair competition regulations of the Japanese Bread Fair Trade Council, a jin only needs to be more than 340 g.

== Korea ==
The base unit of Korean mass is the gwan. At the time of Korea's metrication, however, the geun (or Korean pound) was in more common use. The gwan is usually considered equivalent to 600 g. The nyang also sees some use among Korean traditional Chinese medicine vendors.

Korean romanization			Korean	English	Equivalents		
RR	MR	Other	Korean	English	Gwan	Other names	Metric (customary)
Ho	Ho		호(毫)		1/1,000,000		3.75 mg (0.0579 gr)
Mo	Mo		모(毛)		1/1,000,000		3.75 mg (0.0579 gr)
Ri	Ri		리(釐/厘)		1/100,000		0.0375 g (0.00132 oz)
Pun	P'un		푼		1/10,000		0.375 g (0.0132 oz)
Bun	Pun		분(分)		1/10,000		0.375 g (0.0132 oz)
Don	Ton		돈		1/1,000	Momme	3.75 g (0.132 oz)
Nyang	Nyang	Ryang Yang	냥(兩)	Korean ounce	1/100	Tael	37.5 g (1.32 oz)
Geun	Kŭn	Keun Kon	근(斤)	Korean pound	4/25 (meat), 1/10 (other)	Jin, catty	600 g (21 oz) (meat), 375 g (13.2 oz) (other)
Gwan	Kwan		관(貫)		1		3.75 kg (8.3 lb)

== Vietnam ==
In Vietnam, the jin is called the cân ta (lit. 'our scale'), and is equal to 604.6 grams. The following table lists common units of mass in Vietnam in the early 20th century:

Early 20th-century Vietnamese units of mass
Name in Chữ Quốc ngữ	Hán/Nôm name	Traditional value in kg	Traditional equivalent	Modern value	Modern equivalent
tấn	擯	604.5 kg	10 tạ	1,000 kg	10 tạ
quân		302.25 kg	5 tạ	500 kg	obsolete
tạ	榭	60.45 kg	10 yến	100 kg	10 yến
bình		30.225 kg	5 yến	50 kg	obsolete
yến		6.045 kg	10 cân	10 kg	10 cân
cân	斤	604.5 g	16 lạng	1 kg	10 lạng
nén		378 g	10 lạng		
lạng	兩	37.8 g	10 đồng	100 g	
đồng or tiền	錢	3.78 g	10 phân		
phân	分	0.38 g	10 ly		
ly or li	厘	37.8 mg	10 hào		
hào	毫	3.8 mg	10 ti		
ti	絲	0.4 mg	10 hốt		
hốt	忽	0.04 mg	10 vi		
vi	微	0.004 mg			

Notes:

- The cân ('scale') is also called cân ta ('our scale') to distinguish it from the kilogram (cân tây, 'Western scale').

== Jin, pound and kilogram ==
The jin, pound and kilogram are all currently used in China. Their meanings and conversions in China are as follows:

- 市斤 (Chinese jin; lit. 'market jin'): Or simply called jin, also called Chinese pound. In the market system (市制) in use since 1930, 1 jin equals 500 g, equivalent to 1.1023 pounds.
- 公斤 (kilogram, lit. 'common jin'): A metric unit, equivalent to 1000 g.
- 磅 (pound): A British Imperial unit, about 453.6 g.

== Society and culture ==
=== Etymology ===
The word catty comes from Malay kati, meaning 'the weight'. It has also been borrowed into English as caddy, meaning a container for storing tea.

=== Chinese idioms ===
- wikt:幾斤幾兩 (jǐjīnjǐliǎng)
- wikt:半斤八兩 (bànjīnbāliǎng)
- wikt:缺斤少兩 (quējīnshǎoliǎng)
- wikt:斤斤計較 (jīnjīnjìjiào)

== Gallery ==
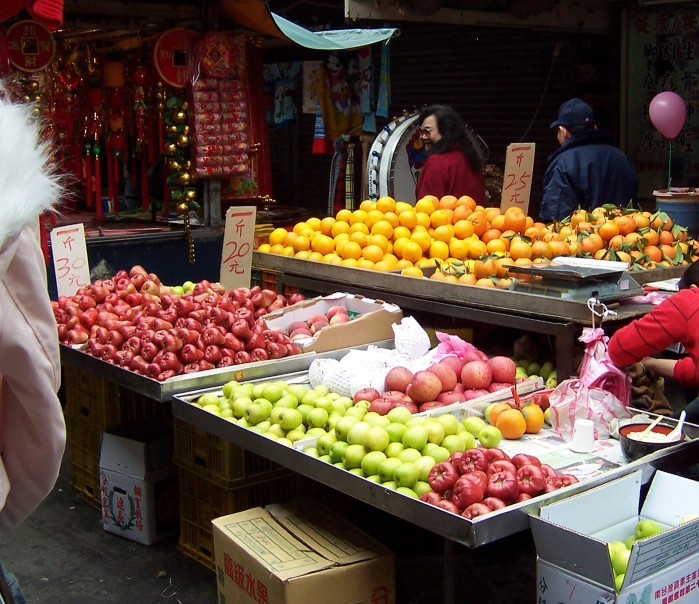
Fruit sold in catties in a market in Sanchong, New Taipei, Taiwan

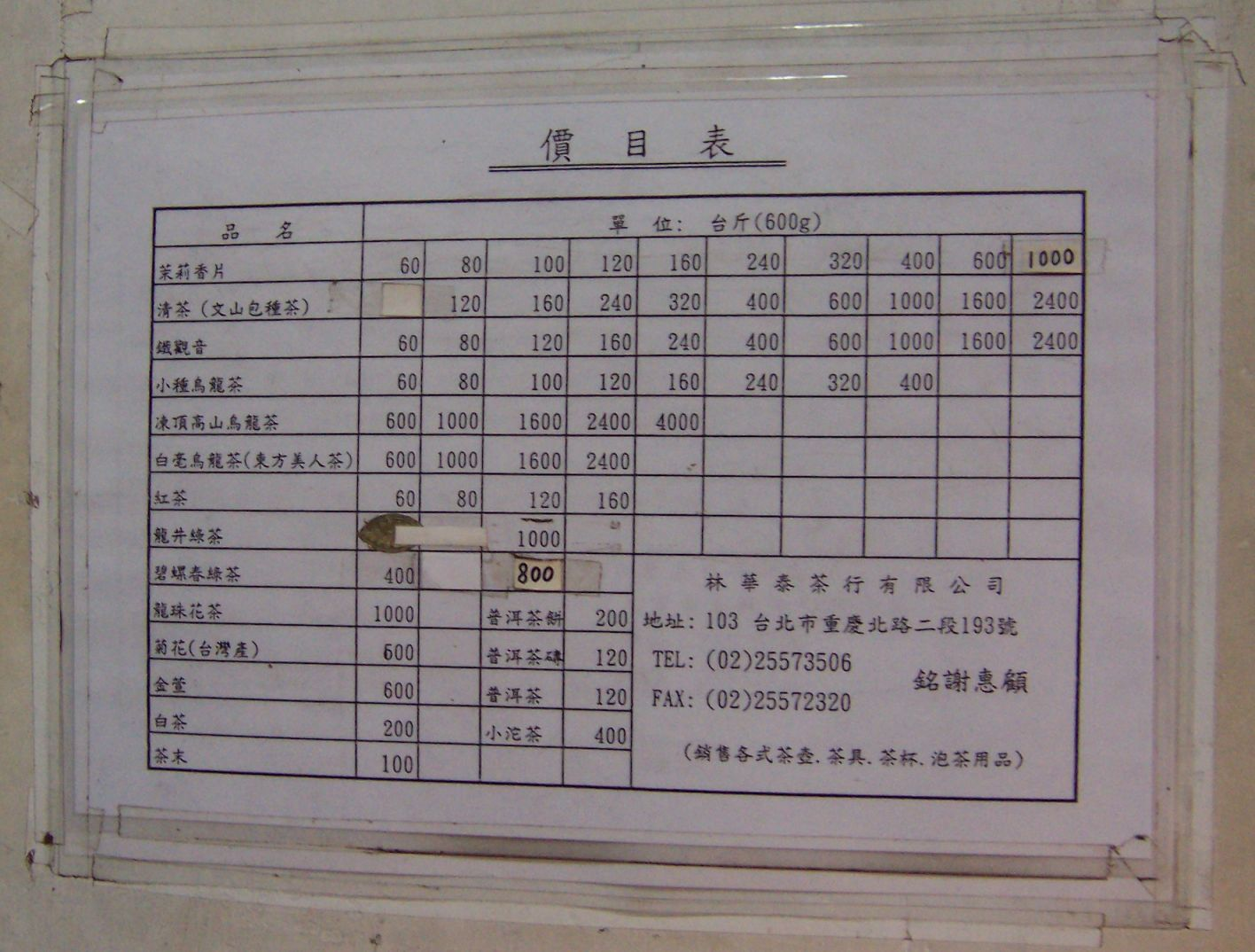
Tea priced by the catty in Dadaocheng, Taipei, Taiwan

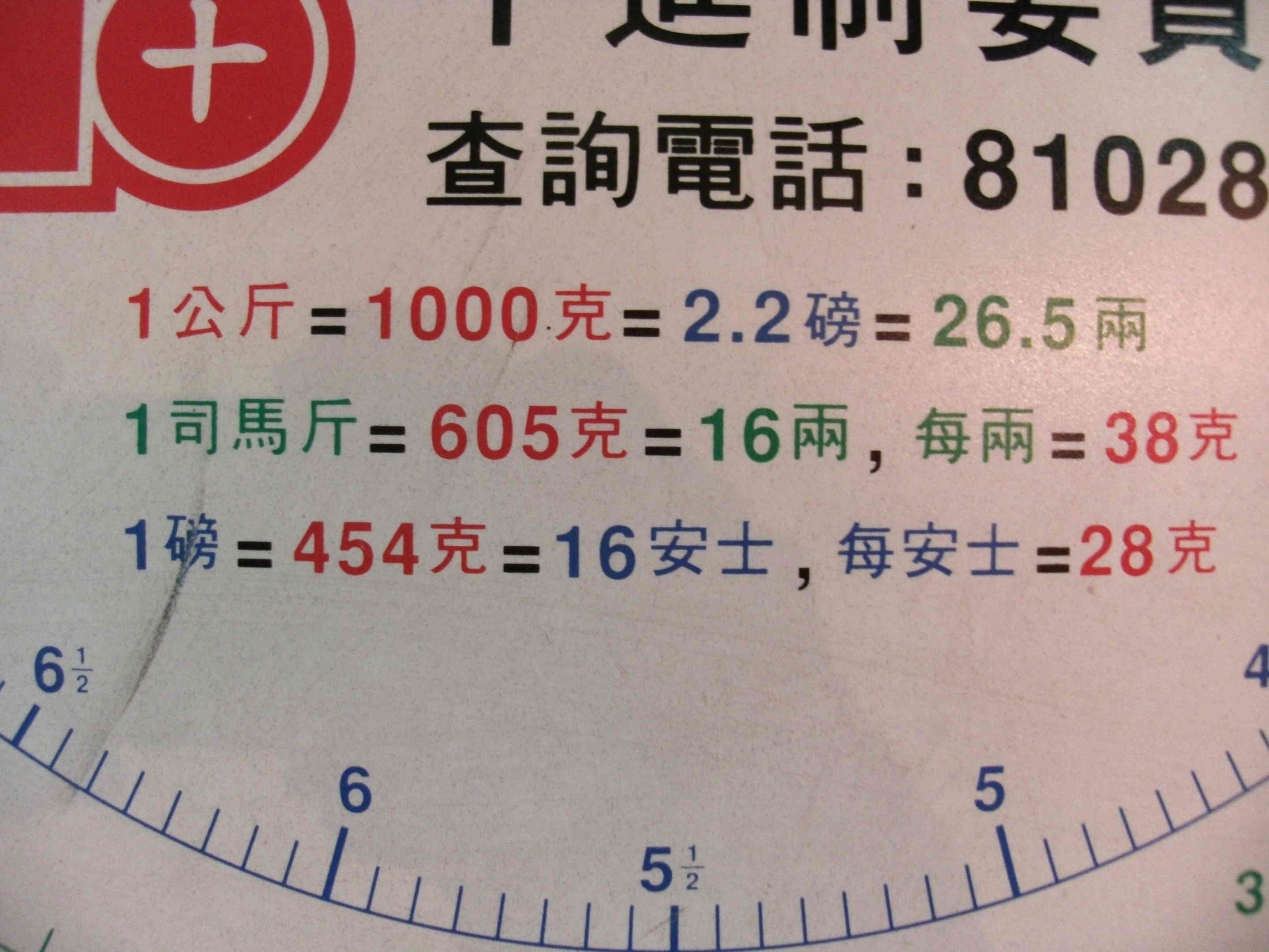
A spring scale in Hong Kong with conversions between the metric system (red), traditional Chinese units (green) and Imperial units (in blue)

== See also ==
- Chinese units of measurement
- Japanese units of measurement
- Korean units of measurement
- Taiwanese units of measurement
- Vietnamese units of measurement
