= Sycee =

Former Chinese ingot currency

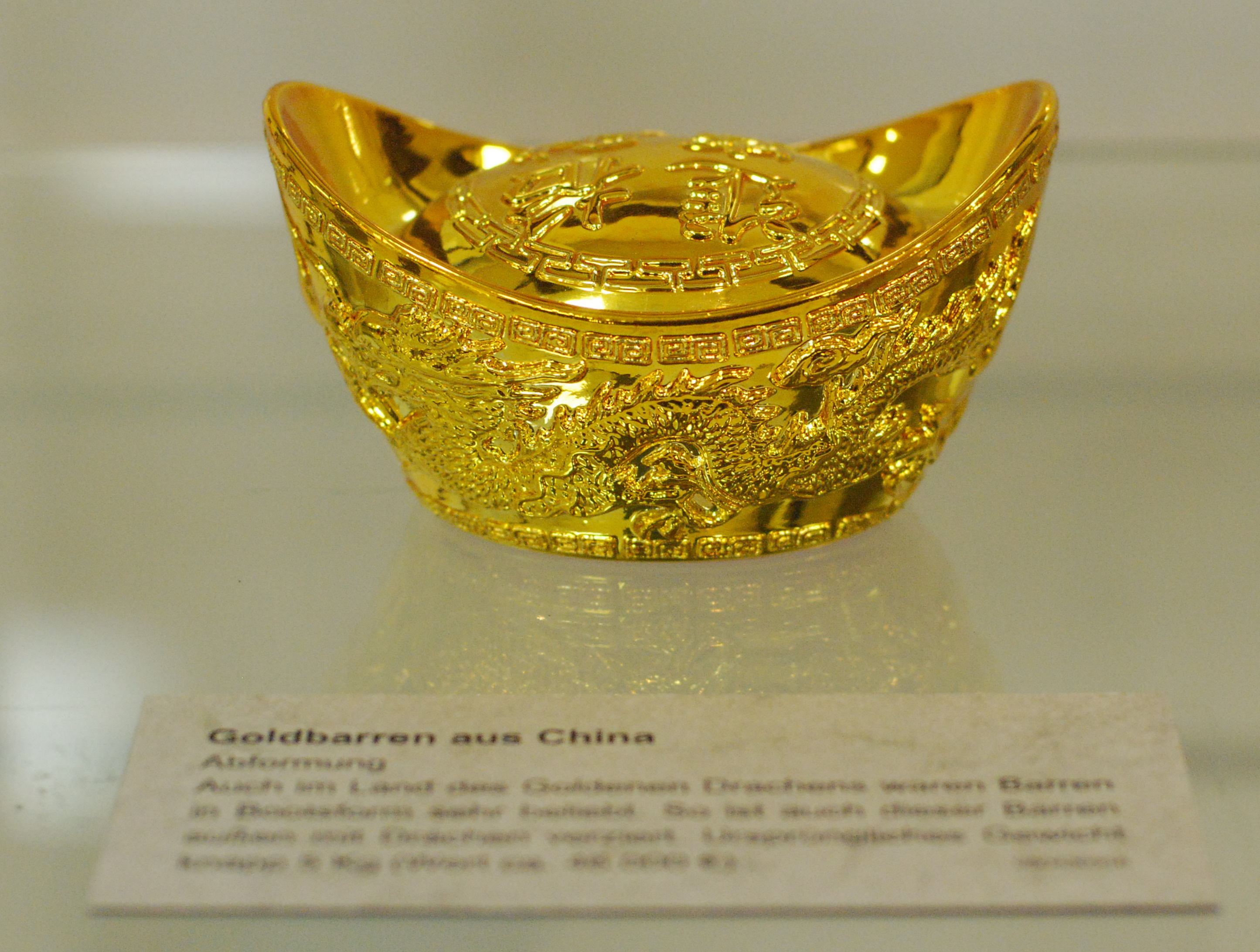
Imperial gold sycee

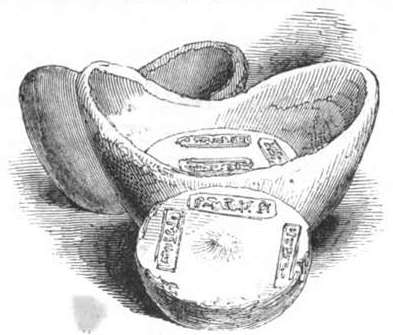
Silver sycee

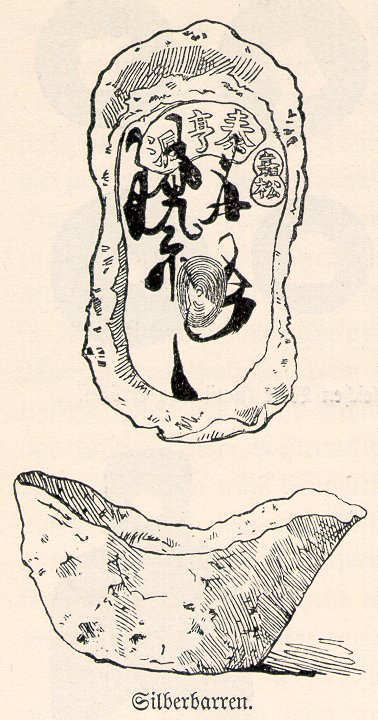
Drawing of a boat-shaped silver sycee

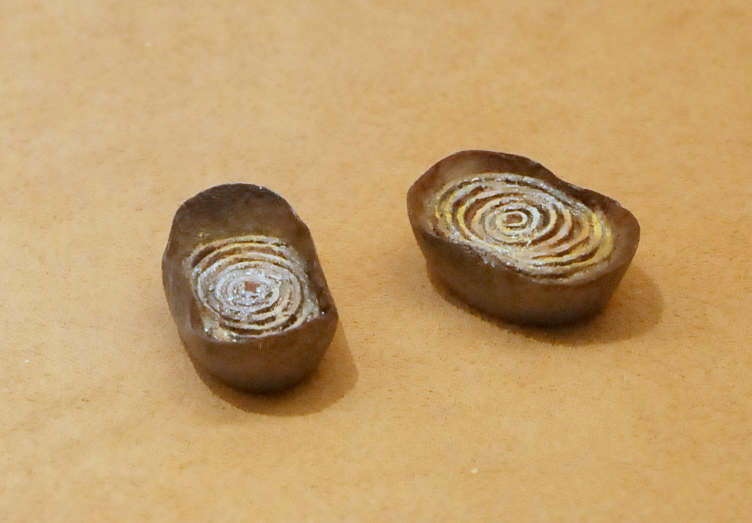
Silver sycee

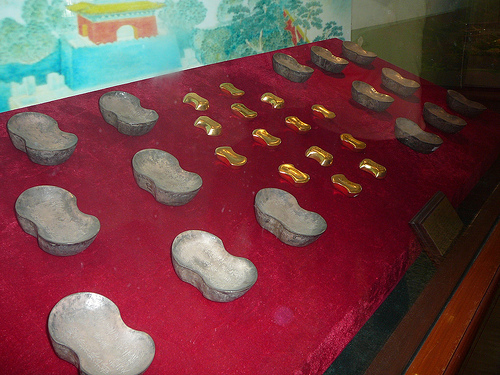
Gold sycee and molds

A sycee (Note: Uncommon variant spellings include sisee and seze.) (/ˈsaɪsiː, saɪˈsiː/; from Cantonese 細絲, Jyutping: Sai3 Si1, lit. 'fine silk') or yuanbao (traditional Chinese: 元寶; simplified Chinese: 元宝; pinyin: yuánbǎo; Jyutping: jyun4 bou2; Pe̍h-ōe-jī: Goân-pó; lit. 'primary treasure') was a type of gold and silver ingot currency used in imperial China from its founding under the Qin dynasty until the fall of the Qing in the 20th century. Sycee were not made by a central bank or mint but by individual goldsmiths or silversmiths for local exchange; consequently, the shape and amount of extra detail on each ingot were highly variable. Square and oval shapes were common, but boat, flower, tortoise and others are known. Their value—like the value of the various silver coins and little pieces of silver in circulation at the end of the Qing dynasty—was determined by experienced moneyhandlers, who estimated the appropriate discount based on the purity of the silver and evaluated the weight in taels and the progressive decimal subdivisions of the tael (mace, candareen, and cash).

In present-day China, gold sycees remain a symbol of wealth and prosperity and are commonly depicted during the Chinese New Year festivities. Paper imitations of gold- or silver-colored sycees are burned along with hell money as a part of Chinese ancestral veneration for Tomb Sweeping Day and the Ghost Festival.

== Name ==
The name "sycee" is an irregular romanization of the Cantonese pronunciation of the characters for "fine silk". This is variously explained as deriving from the ability to draw pure gold or silver out into fine threads or from the silky sheen of quality silver.

The name "yuanbao" is the pinyin romanization of the Mandarin pronunciation of the characters for "inaugural treasures". Under China's Tang dynasty, coins were inscribed Kaiyuan tongbao (開元通寶, "Circulating Treasure of the Beginning of an Era"), later abbreviated to yuanbao. The name was also applied to other non-coin forms of currency. Yuanbao was spelt mambo and yambu in the 19th-century English-language literature on Xinjiang and the trade between Xinjiang and British India.

A yuanbao was also called a dìng (Chinese: 鋌; pinyin: dìng; Wade–Giles: ting) or "silver dìng" (銀鋌; yíndìng; yin-ting).

== History ==
Sycees were first used as a medium for exchange as early as the Qin dynasty (3rd century BC). During the Western Han dynasty (206 BC – 9 AD), the Wu Zhu bronze coins became the main currency in circulation, while hoof-shaped gold ingots known as "Horse Hoof Gold" (Chinese: 馬蹄金) served as an adjunct currency for high-value transactions. During the Tang dynasty, a standard bi-metallic system of silver and copper coinage was codified with 10 silver coins equal to 1,000 copper cash coins.

Paper money and bonds started to be used in China in the 9th century. However, due to monetary problems such as enormous local variations in monetary supply and exchange rates, rapid changes in the relative value of silver and copper, coin fraud, inflation, and political uncertainty with changing regimes, until the time of the Republic payment by weight of silver was the standard practice, and merchants carried their own scales with them. Most of the so-called "opium scales" seen in museums were actually for weighing payments in silver. The tael was still the basis of the silver currency and sycees remained in use until the end of the Qing dynasty. Common weights: 50 taels, 10 taels, 5 taels, 1 tael.

When foreign silver coins began to circulate in China in the later 16th century, they were initially considered a type of "quasi-sycee" and imprinted with seals just as sycees were.

== Contemporary uses ==
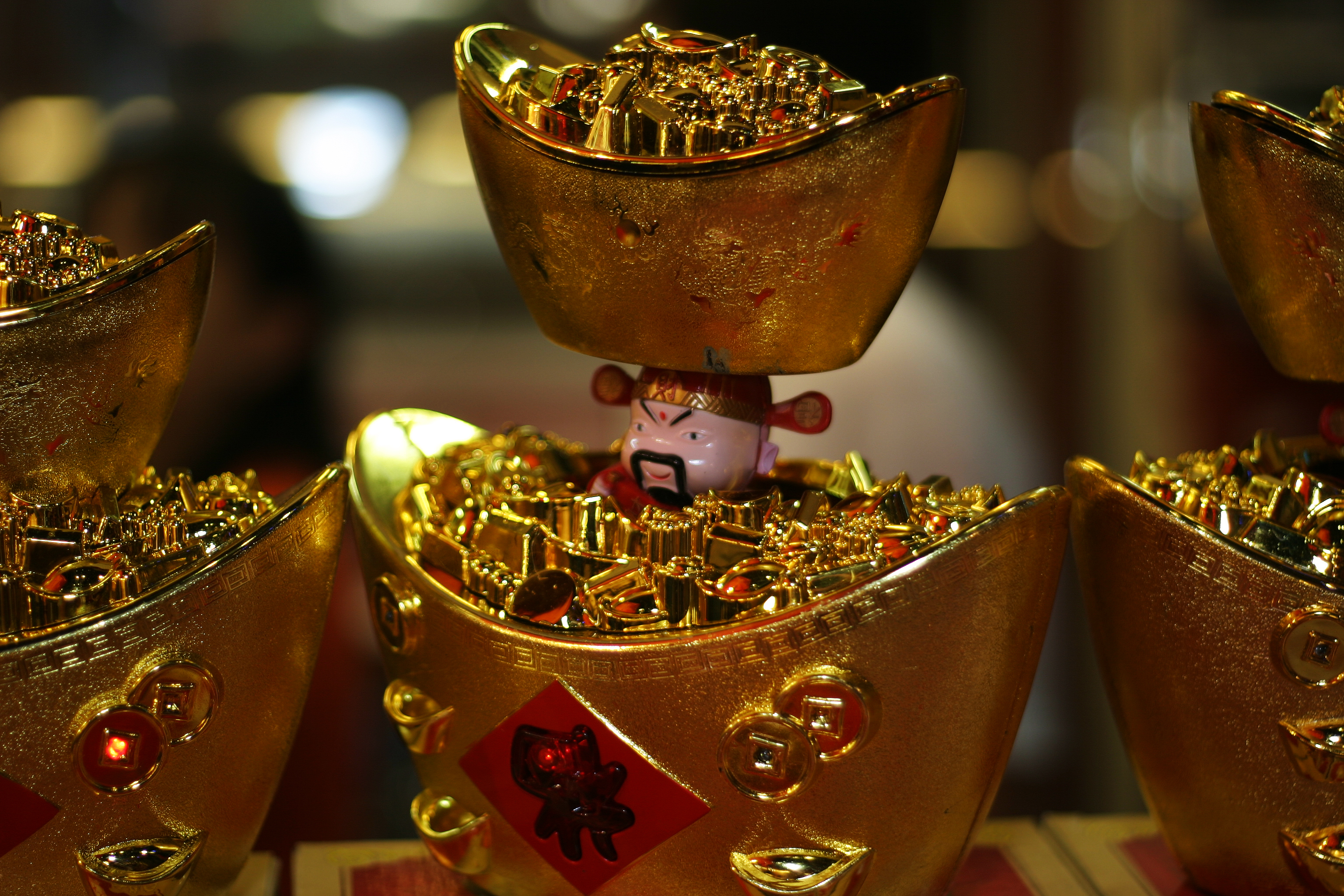
Chinese New Year sycee decoration

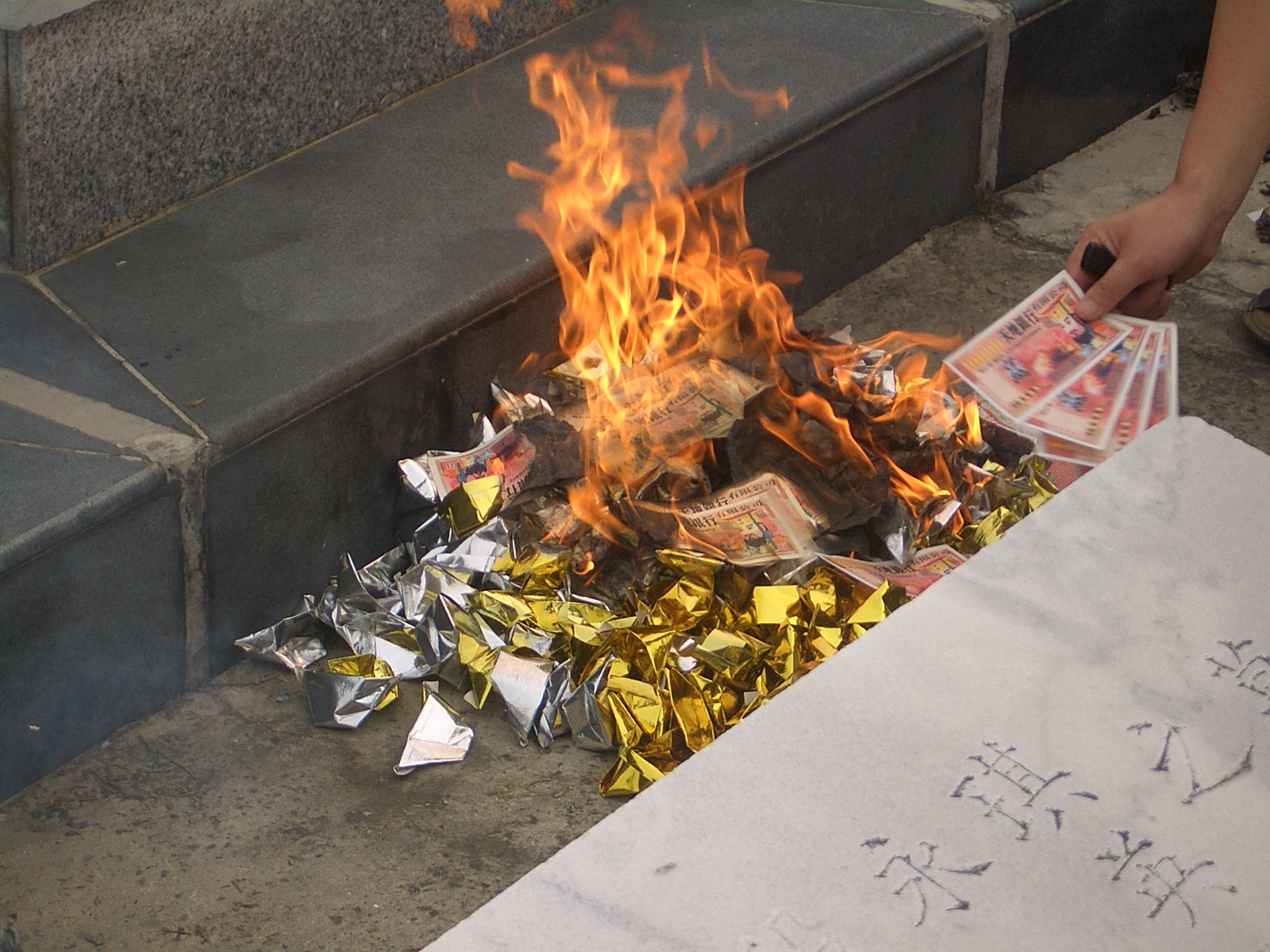
Paper yuanbao burned at a grave

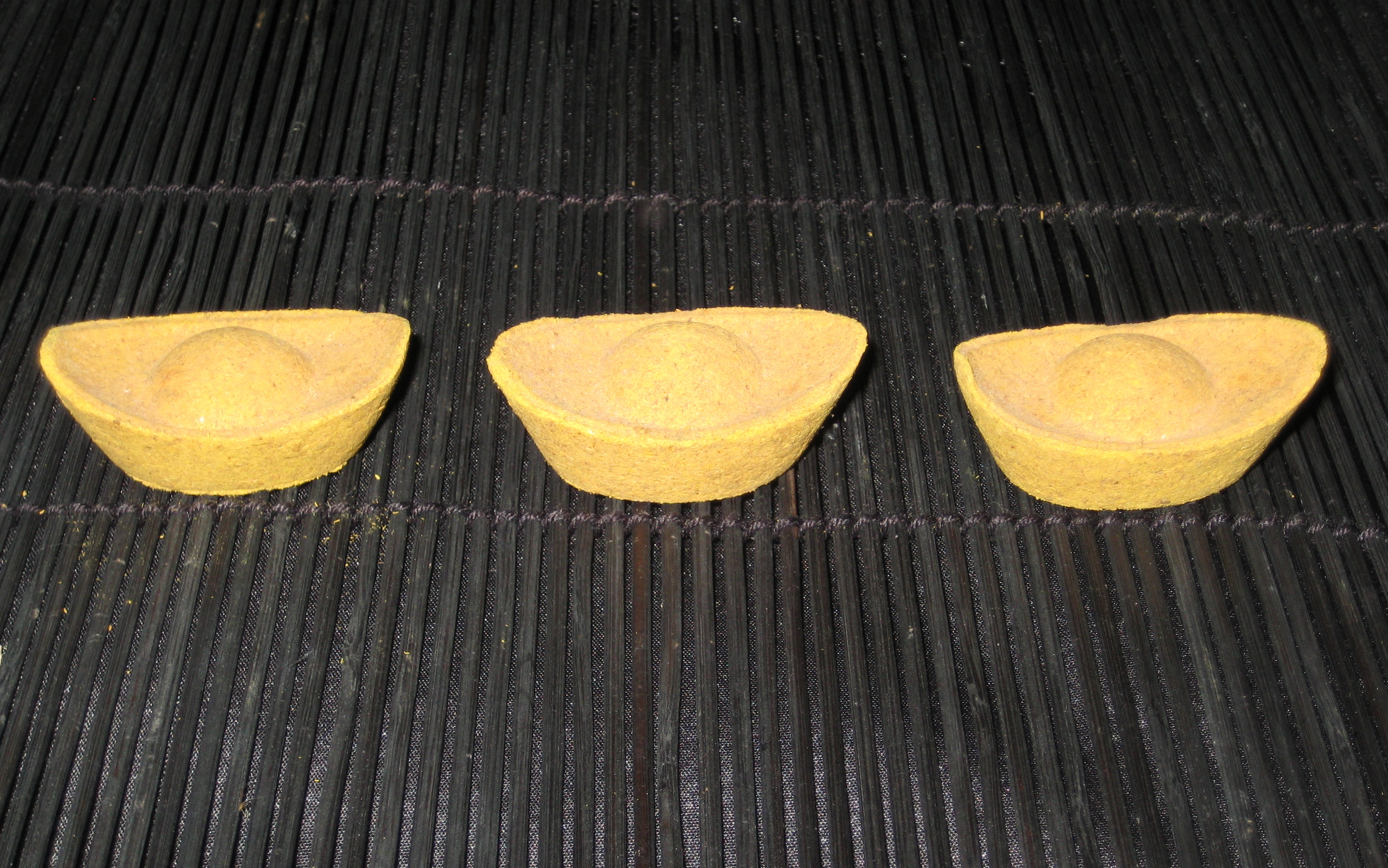
Sycee-shaped incense used in feng shui

Today, imitation gold sycees are used as a symbol of prosperity among Chinese people. They are frequently displayed during Chinese New Year, representing a fortunate year to come. Reproduction or commemorative gold sycees continue to be minted as collectibles.

Another form of imitation yuanbao – made by folding gold- or silver-colored paper – can be burned at ancestors' graves during the Ghost Festival, along with imitation paper money.

Even after currency standard changed in Republican times, the old usage of denominating value by equivalent standard weight of silver survived in Cantonese slang in the common term for a ten-cent and a five-cent piece, e.g., chat fan yi (七分二 "seven candareens, two cash") or saam fan luk (三分六 "three candareens and six cash").

== Notable hoards ==
- The Xinhua News Agency reported on 17 November 2015 that at the tomb of the Marquis of Haihun in Xinjian, Jiangxi a number of gold coins had been found. Excavations of the tomb have been conducted since 2011. The gold objects unearthed included some 25 gold hoofs (a type of sycee) with varying weights from 40 to 250 grams and 50 very large gold coins weighing about 250 grams each. The gold coinages were packed inside of three different boxes that were placed under a bed that was located inside of the main chamber of the tomb. According to Yang Jie, who leads the excavation team, the gold objects were likely awarded to the Marquis of Haihun by the emperor himself.
- It was reported on 24 September 2015 that a number of cash coins had been found in tombs during excavation work undertaken by the Jinan City Archaeological Research Institute nearby the Zhaojiazhuang Cemetery, Shandong. The tombs yielded cash coins produced during the Song, Tang, and Qing dynasties with the latest examples being Xianfeng era cash coins. A tomb identified as "Grave M1" also contained silver sycees issued under the Jin dynasty.
- In March 2017 a large number of cultural relics were discovered at the Minjiang River in Meishan, Sichuan. The findings at the river included over 10,000 individual items of gold and silver including a number of golden and silver sycees. Furthermore a Xiwang Shanggong (西王賞功) cash coin issued by Zhang Xianzhong was unearthed at the Jiangkou stretch of the Minjiang River.

== See also ==
- Economic history of China
- Gold bar
- Silver standard
