= Mongolian units =

Traditional system of measurement used by the Mongolians

Mongolian units are the traditional units of measurement of the Mongolian people.

== Length ==
Mongolian	Latin transliteration	Equivalent to	In metric system (approximate)
хумсны толио	humsny tolio	width of index finger nail	1.1 cm
хуруу	huruu	index finger width	2 cm
ямх	yamh	length of index finger distal phalanx	3.5 cm
барим	barim	fist width	8.5 cm
мухар сөөм	muhar sööm	distance between stretched thumb and proximal phalanx of index finger	13.5 cm
үзүүр сөөм	üzür sööm	distance between stretched thumb and index finger	18 cm
төө	töö	distance between stretched thumb and middle finger	19.5 cm
мухар тохой	muhar tohoi	distance between elbow and fist	33 cm
үзүүр тохой	üzür tohoi	distance between elbow and middle finger, = 20 huruu	40 cm
алхам	alham	distance of one step	50 cm
дэлэм	delem	distance between outstretched arm and opposite shoulder	95 cm
эгэм	egem	= 1 1/2 delem	1.425 m
алд	ald	distance between outstretched arms, = 4 üzür tohoi	1.6 m
гөрөм	göröm	= 2,000 ald	3.2 km
бээр	beer	= 4 göröm	12.8 km
өртөө	örtöö		30 km
хагас өдрийн газар	hagas ödriin gazar	half-day horse ride distance, = 1 1/2 örtöö	45 km
өдрийн газар	ödriin gazar	one-day horse ride distance, = 3 örtöö	90 km
хоногийн газар	honogiin gazar	a day and night horse ride distance, = 4 örtöö	120 km

== Weight ==
Mongolian	English transliteration	In metric system
пүү	püü	16.5 kg
жин	jin	596.816 g
лан	lan	37.301 g
цэн	tsen	3.7301 g

== See also ==
- Chinese, Taiwanese, Hong Kong, Korean, Japanese, & Vietnamese units of measure
