= Ald (unit) =

Obsolete Mongolian unit of measurement

Ald is an obsolete Mongolian measure equal to the average human male's armspan (length between a male's outstretched arms). An ald is therefore approximately equal to 160 cm (63 in).

== See also ==
- Fathom
