= Taiwanese units of measurement =

System of measurement used in Taiwan

Taiwanese units of measurement (Chinese: 臺制; pinyin: Táizhì; Pe̍h-ōe-jī: Tâi-chè; Hakka: Thòi-chṳ) are the customary and traditional units of measure used in Taiwan. The Taiwanese units formed in the 1900s when Taiwan was under Japanese rule. The system mainly refers to Japanese system. The measurement refers to the traditional size of a tatami, a Japanese mat made of woven dried grass, which were positioned to completely cover the floor of traditional Japanese homes, therefore it became a convenient measurement tool as mat area was standardised hundreds of years ago. In Taiwan the measurement units were pronounced in Taiwanese Hokkien and Hakka before World War II and adopted by the Mandarin-speaking immigrants from China in 1949. Today, the Taiwanese units are used exclusively, in some cases alongside official SI units, and in other cases they have been replaced by SI.

Although the Taiwanese units have similar names to those in Chinese units of measurement and Hong Kong units of measurement, the standards are different from those used in China and Hong Kong due to them being Japanese in origin.

The Taiwanese units are not used in the Chinese territories of Kinmen and Matsu, as although they are under the control of the Republic of China, these places have never been under Japanese rule. Instead, they retain the use of Chinese units in the Republican era, which are based on metric values and still mostly the same as People's Republic of China.

== Length ==
Linear measure in Taiwan is largely metric but some units derived from traditional Japanese units of measurement remain in use as a legacy of Japanese rule.

Table of Lengths
| Unit | | | | Taiwanese feet | Metric | | US & Imperial | | Notes |
| Taiwanese Hokkien | Hakka | Mandarin | Character | Taiwanese feet | Exact | Approx. | Exact | Approx. | Notes |
|---|---|---|---|---|---|---|---|---|---|
| Hun | Fûn | Fēn | 分 | 1/100 | 1/330 m | 3.030 mm | 125/37,719 yd | 0.1193 in | Same as Japanese Bu |
| Chhùn | Chhun | Cùn | 寸 | 1/10 | 1/33 m | 3.030 cm | 1250/37,719 yd | 1.193 in | Taiwanese inch; Same as Japanese Sun |
| Chhioh | Chhak | Chǐ | 尺 | 1 | 10/33 m | 30.30 cm | 12,500/37,719 yd | 11.93 in | Taiwanese foot; Same as Japanese Shaku |
| Tn̄g | Chhong | Zhàng | 丈 | 10 | 100/33 m | 3.030 m | 125,000/37,719 yd | 9 ft 11.3 in | Taiwanese fathom; Same as Japanese Jō |

Taiwanese length units and the translation of length units in metric system (SI) shares the same character. The adjective Taiwanese (台) can be added to address the Taiwanese unis system. For example, 台尺 means Taiwanese foot and 公尺 means meter.

== Area ==
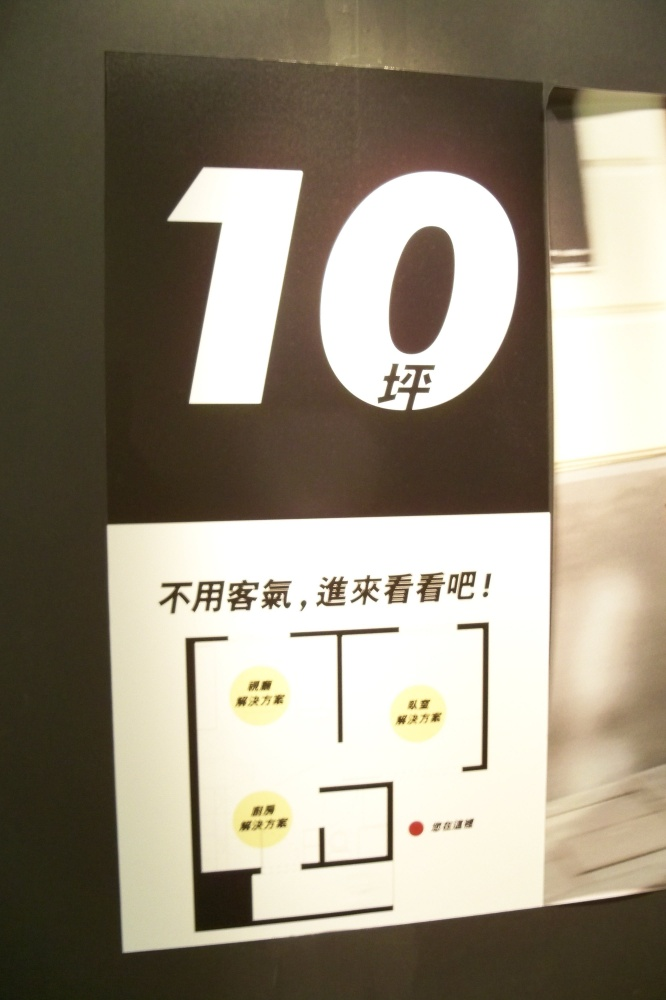
An advertisement from IKEA for a 10-pêⁿ apartment

Unlike with other measures, area continues to be almost commonly measured with traditional units. Taiwanese units of area are derived from both traditional Dutch and Japanese measurements. The principal unit for measuring the floor space of an office or apartment is 坪 (Taiwanese Hokkien: pêⁿ, Hakka: phiàng, Mandarin: píng). The unit is derived from the Japanese tsubo, the base unit of the Japanese area. The principal unit of land measure is 甲 (Taiwanese Hokkien: kah, Hakka: kap, Mandarin: jiǎ). The unit is derived from the obsolete Dutch morgen, which was introduced during Taiwan's Dutch era. In the later era Kingdom of Tungning, 犁 (Taiwanese Hokkien: lê, Hakka: lài, Mandarin: lí) is defined to represent the area that could be farmed by one man with one ox and one plow in one day. Today, the rule for converting the two major units from two different sources is

1 甲 (Taiwanese Hokkien: kah, Hakka: kap, Mandarin: jiǎ, Dutch morgen) = 2,934 坪 (Taiwanese Hokkien: pêⁿ, Hakka: phiàng, Mandarin: píng, Japanese tsubo)

Table of area units
| Unit | | | | Pêⁿ | Kah | Metric | | US & Imperial | | Notes |
| Taiwanese Hokkien | Hakka | Mandarin | Character | Pêⁿ | Kah | Exact | Approx. | Exact | Approx. | Notes |
|---|---|---|---|---|---|---|---|---|---|---|
| Pêⁿ | Phiàng | Píng | 坪 | 1 | | 400/121 m^{2} | 3.306 m^{2} | 625,000,000/158,080,329 sq yd | 35.58 sq ft | Same as Japanese Tsubo |
| Bó͘ | Méu | Mǔ | 畝 | 30 | | 12,000/121 m^{2} | 99.17 m^{2} | 6,250,000,000/52,693,443 sq yd | 1,067 sq ft | Same as Japanese Se |
| Hun | Fûn | Fēn | 分 | 293.4 | 1/10 | 117360/121 m^{2} | 969.92 m^{2} | — | 10,440 sq ft | |
| Kah | Kap | Jiǎ | 甲 | 2,934 | 1 | 1173600/121 m^{2} | 0.9699 ha | — | 2.3967 acres | Derived from Dutch Morgen |
| Lê | Lài | Lí | 犁 | 14,670 | 5 | 5868000/121 m^{2} | 4.8496 ha | — | 11.984 acres | Used from Kingdom of Tungning |

Officially, land area is measured in square metres.

== Volume ==
Volume measure in Taiwan is largely metric, with common units such as liter and milliliter (often abbreviated as "CC" for cubic centimeter).

== Mass ==
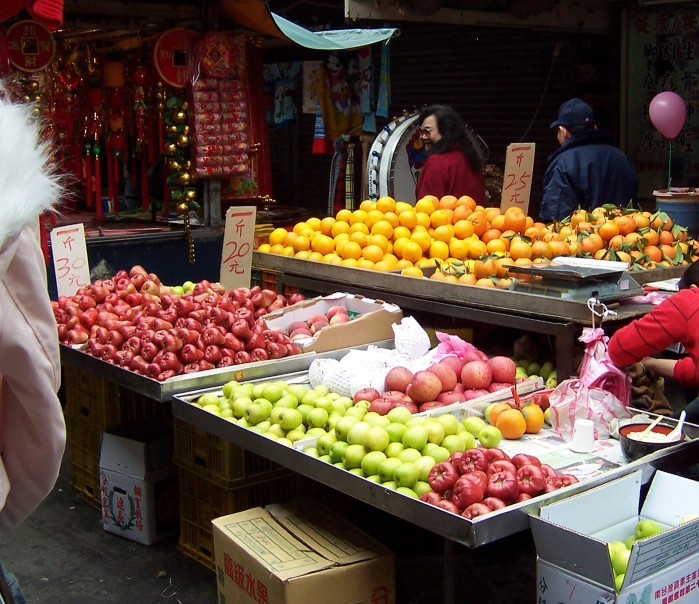
Fruit sold in catties (斤) in a Taiwanese market

Packaged goods in Taiwan largely use metric measurements but bulk foodstuffs sold in wet markets and supermarkets are typically measured with units derived from traditional Japanese units of mass, which are similar but not equivalent to corresponding Chinese units of mass. Imported goods from the US also retains its weight in ounces, although most such packages also lists the weight in grams.

Table of units of mass
| Unit | | | | Niú | Metric | | US & Imperial | | Notes |
| Taiwanese Hokkien | Hakka | Mandarin | Character | Niú | Legal | Decimal | Exact | Approx. | Notes |
|---|---|---|---|---|---|---|---|---|---|
| Lî | Lî | Lí | 釐 | 1/1000 | 3/80,000 kg | 37.5 mg | 3750/45,359,237 lb | 0.5787 gr | Cash; Same as Japanese Rin |
| Hun | Fûn | Fēn | 分 | 1/100 | 3/8000 kg | 375 mg | 37,500/45,359,237 lb | 5.787 gr | Candareen; Same as Japanese Fun |
| Chîⁿ | Chhièn | Qián | 錢 | 1/10 | 3/800 kg | 3.75 g | 375,000/45,359,237 lb | 2.116 dr | Mace; Same as Japanese Momme (匁) |
| Niú | Liông | Liǎng | 兩 | 1 | 3/80 kg | 37.5 g | 3,750,000/45,359,237 lb | 21.16 dr | Tael |
| Kin/Kun | Kîn | Jīn | 斤 | 16 | 3/5 kg | 600 g | 60,000,000/45,359,237 lb | 1.323 lb | Catty; Same as Japanese Kin |
| Tàⁿ | Tâm | Dàn | 擔 | 1600 | 60 kg | | 6,000,000,000/45,359,237 lb | 132.3 lb | Picul; Same as Japanese Tan |

Note the tael and catty are widely used.

== See also ==
- Units, Systems, & History of measurement
- Chinese & Hong Kong units of measurement
- Japanese, Korean, Mongolian & Vietnamese units of measurement
