= Micropound =

Unit of Weight

The micropound (abbreviation μlb) is a small unit of avoirdupois weight and mass in the US and imperial systems of measurement, equal to one one-millionth (1/1,000,000) pound. It is equal to exactly 453.59237/1,000,000,000 kg or about 453.6 μg.

== See also ==
- English, US, & imperial units of measurement
- Avoirdupois pound
