= Momme (unit) =

Japanese unit of mass and currency

匁

Unit
- Symbol: 匁 (Momme)

Denominations
- Subunit
- 1/10000: Fun (分)
- Banknotes: 1匁
- Coins: 4.6匁, (Note: Some of these coins were also valued in units of Fun (分) example: "4 Momme 6 Fun".) 5匁, 8匁, 9.2匁 10匁

Demographics
- User(s): Japan

Issuance
- Central bank: Ginza
- This infobox shows the latest status before this currency was rendered obsolete.

Momme (匁, monme) is both a Japanese unit of mass and former unit of currency. As a measurement, Momme is part of a table of Japanese units where during the Edo period it was equal to 1/10 ryō (aka Tael). Since the Meiji era 1 momme has been reformed to equal exactly 3.75 grams in SI units. The latter term for Momme refers to when it was used as a unit of currency during the Edo period in the form of silver coins. As a term, the word "Momme" and its symbol "匁" are unique to Japan. The Chinese equivalent to Momme is qián (Chinese: 錢), which is also a generic word for "money". While the term Momme is no longer used for currency, it survives as a standard unit of measure used by pearl dealers to communicate with pearl producers and wholesalers.

== Origin ==
The Japanese word Momme first appeared in a family book by the Ōuchi clan during the Bunmei era in 1484. In the English language the word first appears in the early 1700s per the Oxford English Dictionary, which first traces its usage to Johann Jakob Scheuchzer in 1727.

== Historical Use ==
Momme was originally introduced as a unit of weight for measuring precious metals, especially during the Edo period, when Japan was under the rule of the Tokugawa Shogunate. It was primarily used in the context of trade involving gold, silver, and other metals, with its role in the silver market being particularly significant. The ryō, the main unit of currency during the Edo period, was subdivided into 10 momme. This system helped regulate both currency and precious metal trade in a highly controlled economic environment.

The reform of Momme during the Meiji era aligned the unit with the international metric system, standardizing it to 3.75 grams. This reform was part of broader efforts to modernize Japan and integrate it more closely into global trade networks.

== See also ==
- Tokugawa coinage
- 1 rin coin
- 5 rin coin
