= Mace (unit) =

Unit of weight and currency

Chinese name
- Chinese: 錢
Transcriptions
Standard Mandarin
- Hanyu Pinyin: qián
- Wade–Giles: ch'ien^{2}
Hakka
- Romanization: tshièn
Yue: Cantonese
- Yale Romanization: chìhn
- Jyutping: cin4
Southern Min
- Hokkien POJ: chîⁿ

Vietnamese name
- Vietnamese alphabet: tiền, chỉ
- Chữ Hán: 錢

Korean name
- Hangul: 돈, 전
- Hanja: 錢
Transcriptions
- Revised Romanization: don, jeon
- McCune–Reischauer: ton, chŏn

Mongolian name
- Mongolian Cyrillic: цэн

Japanese name
- Kanji: 錢 (匁)
- Hiragana: せん (もんめ)
Transcriptions
- Romanization: sen (monme)

Malay name
- Malay: mas

Manchu name
- Manchu script: ᠵᡳᡥᠠ
- Möllendorff: jiha

A mace (Chinese: 錢; pinyin: qián; Hong Kong English usage: tsin; Southeast Asian English usage: chee) is a traditional Chinese measurement of weight in East Asia that was also used as a currency denomination. It is equal to 10 candareens and is 1/10 of a tael or approximately 3.78 grams. A troy mace is approximately 3.7429 grams. In Hong Kong, one mace is 3.779936375 grams. and in Ordinance 22 of 1884, it is 2/15 ounces avoirdupois. In Singapore, one mace (referred to as chee) is 3.77994 grams.

In imperial China, 10 candareens equaled 1 mace which was 1/10 of a tael and, like the other units, was used in weight-denominated silver currency system. A common denomination was 7 mace and 2 candareens, equal to one silver Chinese yuan.

== Name ==
Like other similar measures such as tael and catty, the English word "mace" derives from Malay, in this case through Dutch maes, plural masen, from Malay mas which, in turn, derived from Sanskrit māṣa (माष), a word related to "mash," another name for the urad bean, and masha, a traditional Indian unit of weight equal to 0.97 gram. This word is unrelated to other uses of "mace" in English.

The Chinese word for mace is qián (Chinese: 錢), which is also a generic word for "money" in Mandarin Chinese. The same Chinese character (kanji) was used for the Japanese sen, the former unit equal to 1/100 of a Japanese yen, the Korean chŏn (revised: jeon), the former unit equal to 1/100 of a Korean won, and for the Vietnamese tiền, a currency used in late imperial Vietnam, although none of these has ever been known as "mace" in English. Besides in precious metal measurements (gold, silver) in Vietnam, mace is chỉ which is equivalent to 37.5 grams.

== See also ==
- Chinese units of measurement
- Economic history of China (Pre-1911)
- Economic history of China (1912–1949)
- Economy of China
- Hong Kong units of measurement
- Taiwanese units of measurement
