= Vietnamese units of measurement =

Traditional system of measurement used in Vietnam

Vietnamese units of measurement (Vietnamese: hệ đo lường Việt Nam) are the largely decimal units of measurement traditionally used in Vietnam until metrication. The base unit of length is the thước (chữ Nôm: 𡱩; lit. "ruler") or xích (chữ Hán: 尺). Some of the traditional unit names have been repurposed for metric units, such as thước for the metre, while other traditional names remain in translations of imperial units, such as dặm Anh (English "dặm") for the mile.

== History ==
Originally, many thước of varying lengths were in use in Vietnam, each used for different purposes. According to Hoàng Phê (1988), the traditional system of units had at least two thước of different lengths before 1890, the thước ta (lit. "our ruler") or thước mộc ("wooden ruler"), equal to 0.425 metres (1 ft 4.7 in), and the thước đo vải ("ruler for measuring cloth"), equal to 0.645 metres (2 ft 1.4 in). According to historian Nguyễn Đình Đầu, the trường xích and điền xích were both equal to 0.4664 metres (1 ft 6.36 in), while according to Phan Thanh Hải, there were three main thước: the thước đo vải, from 0.6 to 0.65 metres (2 ft 0 in to 2 ft 2 in); the thước đo đất ("ruler for measuring land"), at 0.47 metres (1 ft 7 in); and the thước mộc, from 0.28 to 0.5 metres (11 in to 1 ft 8 in).

With French colonization, Cochinchina converted to the metric system, the French standard, while Annam and Tonkin continued to use a thước đo đất or điền xích equal to 0.47 metres (1 ft 7 in). On June 2, 1897, Indochinese Governor-General Paul Doumer decreed that all the variations of thước (such as thước ta, thước mộc, and điền xích) would be unified at one thước ta to 0.40 metres (1 ft 4 in), effective January 1, 1898, in Tonkin. Annam retained the old standard for measuring land, so distance and area (such as sào) in Annam were 4.7/4 and (4.7/4)^{2} times the equivalent units in Tonkin, respectively.

== Length ==
The following table lists common units of length in Vietnam in the early 20th century, according to a United Nations Statistical Commission handbook:

Early 20th-century units of length
Name in chữ Quốc ngữ	Hán/Nôm name	Traditional value	Traditional conversion	Modern value	Modern conversion
trượng	丈	4 m	2 ngũ = 10 thước		
ngũ	五	2 m	5 thước		
thước or xích	𡱩 / 尺	40 cm	10 tấc	1 m	10 tấc
tấc	𡬷	4 cm	10 phân	10 cm	10 phân
phân	分	4 mm	10 ly	1 cm	10 ly
ly or li	釐	0.4 mm	10 hào	1 mm	
hào	毫	0.04 mm	10 ti		
ti	絲	4 μm	10 hốt		
hốt	忽	0.4 μm	10 vi		
vi	微	0.04 μm			

Notes:

- The thước is also called thước ta to distinguish it from the metre (thước tây, lit. "Western ruler"). Other than for measuring length, the thước is also used for measuring land area (see below).
- According to the UN handbook, some areas unofficially use 1 trượng = 4.7 metres (15 ft). According to Hoàng Phê (1988), the trượng has two definitions: 10 Chinese chi (about 3.33 m) or 4 thước mộc (about 1.70 m).
- The tấc is also given as túc. According to the UN handbook, some areas unofficially use 1 tấc = 4.7 centimetres (1.9 in).

Miscellaneous units:

chai vai
1 chai vai = 14.63 metres (48.0 ft)
dặm
According to Hoàng Phê (1988), 1 dặm = 444.44 metres (1,458.1 ft). According to Vĩnh Cao and Nguyễn Phố (2001), 1 dặm = 1 800 xích (Chinese chi) = 576 metres (1,890 ft)
lý or lí
According to Vĩnh Cao and Nguyễn Phố (2001), there are two kinds of lý: 1 công lý = 1 km = 3 125 xích, while thị lý is a traditional unit equal to 1 562.55 xích.
sải

== Area ==
The following table lists common units of area in Vietnam in the early 20th century, according to the UN handbook:

Early 20th-century units of area
Name in chữ Quốc ngữ	Hán/Nôm name	Traditional value	Traditional conversion	Dimensions	Annamite value
mẫu	畝	3 600 m^{2}	10 sào		4 970 m^{2}
sào	巢	360 m^{2}	10 miếng		497 m^{2}
miếng		36 m^{2}		3 ngũ × 3 ngũ	
xích or thước	尺 / 𡱩	24 m^{2}	10 tấc		33 m^{2}
than		4 m^{2}		1 ngũ × 1 ngũ	
tấc or thốn	𡬷 / 寸	2.4 m^{2}	10 phân		3.313 5 m^{2}
phân		0.24 m^{2}			
ô or ghế		0.16 m^{2}	10 khấu	1 thước × 1 thước	
khấu		0.016 m^{2}			

Notes:

- Annamite units of area were (4.7/4)^{2} times those of other areas, due to units of length (trượng, tấc, etc.) being 4.7/4 times those of other areas, as explained above.
- According to the UN handbook, the phân is also written phấn.
- The sào is also given as cao. Tonkin and Annam had different definitions of the sào.

Miscellaneous units:

công or công đất
The công, used for surveying forested areas, typically in southwestern Vietnam, was equivalent to 1,000 square metres (11,000 sq ft).
dặm vuông
The dặm vuông measures 1 dặm × 1 dặm.

== Volume ==
The following table lists common units of volume in Vietnam in the early 20th century, according to the UN handbook and Thiều Chửu:

Early 20th-century units of volume
Name in chữ Quốc ngữ	Hán/Nôm name	Traditional value	Traditional conversion	Dimensions	Notes
hộc	斛	16 m^{3}	10 lẻ	10 ngũ × 1 ngũ × 1 thước	1 hộc of unhusked rice ≈ 60 L
miếng		14.4 m^{3}		3 ngũ × 3 ngũ × 1 thước	For buying and selling land
lẻ or than		1.6 m^{3}		1 ngũ × 1 ngũ × 1 thước	1 lẻ of husked rice ≈ 0.1 L
thưng or thăng		2 L	1 000 sao		
đấu	斗	1 L	2 bát = 5 cáp		
bát		0.5 L			
cáp		0.2 L	100 sao		
sao or (colloquially) nhắm	抄	2 mL	10 toát		Grain
toát or (colloquially) nhón	撮	0.2 mL			Grain

Additionally:

- 1 phương of husked rice = 13 thăng or 30 bát (bowls) in 1804
- 1 vuông of husked rice = 604 gr 50
- 1 phương or vuông or commonly giạ = 38.5 litres (8.5 imp gal; 10.2 US gal), though it is sometimes given as 1 phương = ½ hộc or about 30 L
- During French administration, 1 giạ was defined as 40 litres (8.8 imp gal; 11 US gal) for husked rice but only 20 litres (4.4 imp gal; 5.3 US gal) for some other goods. It was commonly used for measuring rice and salt.
- 1 túc = 3 1/3 microlitres (0.00020 cu in)
- 1 uyên = 1 litre (0.22 imp gal; 0.26 US gal)

The following table lists units of volume in use during French administration in Cochinchina:

Units of volume in Cochinchina
Name in quốc ngữ	Traditional conversion	Traditional value	Usage	Weight
hộc	26 thăng	71.905 L	unhusked rice	1 tạ of unhusked rice = 68 kg
vuông	13 thăng	35.953 L, later 40 L	husked rice	
thăng		2.766 L		
hiệp	0.1 thăng	0.276 L		
thược	0.01 thăng	0.0276 L		

Notes:

- Unhusked rice was measured in hộc while husked rice was measured in vuông because a hộc of unhusked rice becomes 1 vuông after husking.
- 1 hộc of unhusked rice weighs 1 tạ.

Miscellaneous units:

thùng
In Cochinchina and Cambodia, 1 thùng (lit. "bucket") = 20 litres (4.4 imp gal; 5.3 US gal). The thùng is also given as tau.

== Weight ==
The following table lists common units of mass or weight in Vietnam in the early 20th century:

Early 20th-century units of weight
Name in Chữ Quốc ngữ	Hán/Nôm name	Traditional value	Traditional conversion	Modern value	Modern conversion
tấn	擯	604.5 kg	10 tạ	1 000 kg	10 tạ
quân		302.25 kg	5 tạ	500 kg	obsolete
tạ	榭	60.45 kg	10 yến	100 kg	10 yến
bình		30.225 kg	5 yến	50 kg	obsolete
yến		6.045 kg	10 cân	10 kg	10 cân
cân	斤	604.5 g	16 lạng	1 kg	10 lạng
nén		378 g	10 lạng		
lạng	兩	37.8 g	10 đồng	100 g	
đồng or tiền	錢	3.78 g	10 phân		
phân	分	0.38 g	10 ly		
ly or li	厘	37.8 mg	10 hào		
hào	毫	3.8 mg	10 ti		
ti	絲	0.4 mg	10 hốt		
hốt	忽	0.04 mg	10 vi		
vi	微	0.004 mg			

Notes:

- The tấn in the context of ship capacity is equal to 2.8317 or 1.1327 cubic metres (100.00 or 40.00 cu ft).
- The cân (lit. "scale") is also called cân ta ("our scale") to distinguish it from the kilogram (cân tây, "Western scale").
- The nén is also given in one source as 375 grams (13.2 oz), but this value conflicts with the lạng from the same source at 37.8 grams (1.33 oz). The 375-gram value is consistent with the system of units for measuring precious metals.
- The đồng is also called đồng cân, to distinguish it from monetary uses.
- The French colonial administration defined some additional units for use in trade: nén = 2 thoi = 10 đính = 10 lượng

Units for measuring precious metals:

- The lạng, also called cây or lượng, is equal to 10 chỉ. 1 cây = 37.50 grams (1.323 oz)
- 1 chỉ = 3.75 grams (0.132 oz)

Miscellaneous units:

binh

- The binh was equivalent to 69 pounds (31 kg) in Annam.

== Time ==
canh (更)
The canh or trống canh is equal to 2 hours (7,200 s).
giờ
The giờ, giờ đồng hồ, or tiếng đồng hồ is equal to 1 hour (3,600 s).

== Currency ==
Traditionally, the basic units of Vietnamese currency were quan (貫, quán), tiền, and đồng. One quan was 10 tiền, and one tiền was between 50 and 100 đồng, depending on the time period.

- From the reign of Emperor Trần Thái Tông onward, 1 tiền was 69 đồng in ordinary commercial transactions but 1 tiền was 70 đồng for official transactions.
- From the reign of Emperor Lê Lợi, 1 tiền was decreed to be 50 đồng.
- During the Northern and Southern dynasties period, beginning in 1528, coins were reduced from 24 millimetres (0.94 in) to 23 millimetres (0.91 in) in diameter and diluted with zinc and iron. The smaller coinage was called tiền gián or sử tiền, in contrast to the larger tiền quý (literally, "valuable cash") or cổ tiền. One quan tiền quý was equivalent to 600 đồng, while 1 quan tiền gián was only 360 đồng.
- During the Later Lê dynasty, 1 tiền was 60 đồng; therefore, 600 đồng was 1 quan.
- During the Yuan dynasty, Vietnamese traders at the border with China used the rate 1 tiền to 67 đồng.
- Zinc coins began to appear in Dai Viet during the 18th century. One copper (đồng) coin was worth 3 zinc (kẽm) coins.
- Beginning with the reign of Emperor Gia Long, both copper and zinc coins were in use. Originally the two coins had equal value, but eventually a copper coin rose to double the worth of a zinc coin, then triple, then sixfold, until the reign of Emperor Thành Thái, it was worth ten times a zinc coin.

Under French colonial rule, Vietnam used the units hào, xu, chinh, and cắc. After independence, Vietnam used đồng, hào, and xu, with 1 đồng equaling 10 hào or 100 xu. After the Vietnam War, chronic inflation caused both subdivisions to fall out of use, leaving đồng as the only unit of currency. However, Overseas Vietnamese communities continue to use hào and xu to refer to the tenth and hundredth denominations, respectively, of a foreign currency, such as xu for the American cent.

== See also ==
- Heavenly Stems & Earthly Branches
- Units, Systems, & History of measurement
- Chinese, Taiwanese, Hong Kong, Japanese, Mongolian & Korean units of measurement
