= Cash (mass) =

Traditional Chinese unit of mass

Chinese name
- Traditional Chinese: 釐
- Simplified Chinese: 厘
Transcriptions
Standard Mandarin
- Hanyu Pinyin: lí
- Wade–Giles: li^{2}
Yue: Cantonese
- Yale Romanization: lèih
- Jyutping: lei^{4}
Southern Min
- Hokkien POJ: lî

Korean name
- Hangul: 고칠 이
- Hanja: 錢
Transcriptions
- Revised Romanization: gochil i
- McCune–Reischauer: koch'il i

Japanese name
- Kanji: 釐
- Hiragana: り
Transcriptions
- Romanization: ri

Cash or li (simplified Chinese: 厘; traditional Chinese: 釐 or 厘; pinyin: lí) is a traditional Chinese unit of weight.

The terms "cash" or "le" were documented to have been used by British explorers in the 1830s when trading in Qing territories of China.

Under the Hong Kong statute of the Weights and Measures Ordinance, 1 cash is about 0.0013 ounces (0.037 g). Currently, it is 1/10 candareen or 1/16000 catty, namely 37.79936375 milligrams (0.5833333269 gr).

== See also ==
- Chinese units of measurement
