= Picul =

Traditional Asian unit of mass

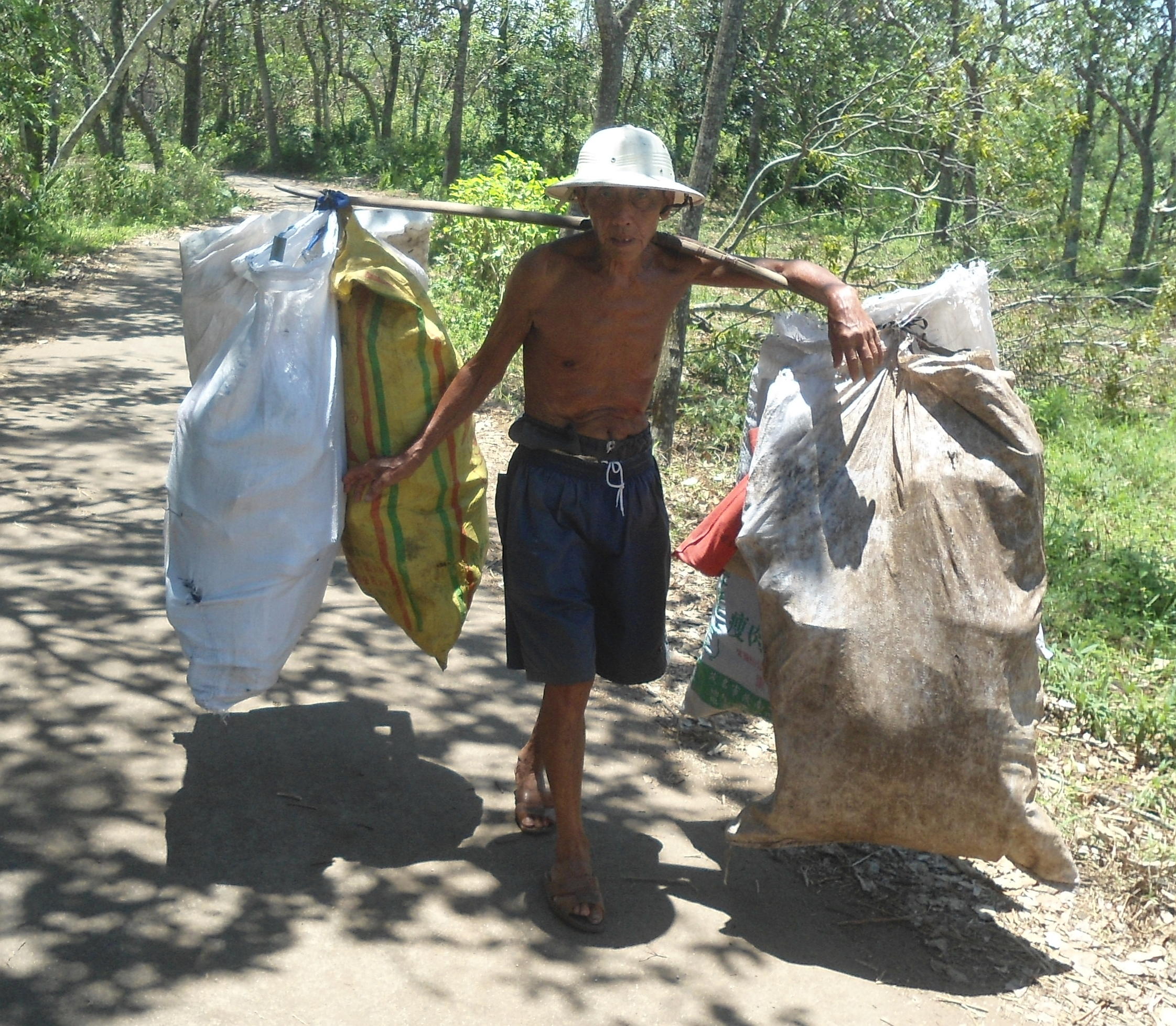

Chinese name
- Traditional Chinese: 擔
- Simplified Chinese: 担
Transcriptions
Standard Mandarin
- Hanyu Pinyin: dàn
- Wade–Giles: tan
Hakka
- Romanization: tâm
Yue: Cantonese
- Yale Romanization: daam
- Jyutping: daam1
Southern Min
- Hokkien POJ: tàⁿ

Vietnamese name
- Vietnamese: đảm

Korean name
- Hangul: 담
- Hanja: 擔
Transcriptions
- Revised Romanization: dam

Mongolian name
- Mongolian Cyrillic: дан
- Mongolian script: ᠳ᠋ᠠᠨ
Transcriptions
- SASM/GNC: dan

Japanese name
- Kanji: 担
- Hiragana: たん / ピクル, ㌯
Transcriptions
- Romanization: tan / pikuru

Malay name
- Malay: pikul (ڤيكول)

The picul /ˈpɪkəl/, shi (Chinese: 石; lit. 'stone'), dan or tam, is a traditional Asian unit of weight, defined as "as much as a man can carry on a shoulder-pole". Throughout most of Chinese history, it was defined as equivalent to 120 catties. Some later definitions (British Hong Kong, Chinese market-use system) define it as 100 catties. It is most commonly used in southern China and Maritime Southeast Asia.

== History ==
The unit originated in China during the Qin dynasty (221–206 BC), where it was known as the shi (石 "stone"). During the Han dynasty, one stone was equal to 120 catties. Government officials were paid in grain, counted in stones, with top ranked ministers being paid 2000 stones.

As a unit of measurement, the word shi (石) can also be pronounced dan. To avoid confusion, the character is sometimes changed to 擔 (dàn), meaning "burden" or "load". Likewise, in Cantonese the word is pronounced sek (石) or daam (擔), and in Hakka it is pronounced tam (擔).

The word picul appeared as early as the mid 9th century in Javanese. In modern Malay, pikul is also a verb meaning 'to carry on the shoulder'.

In the early days of Hong Kong as a British colony, the stone (石, with a Cantonese pronunciation given as shik) was used as a measurement of weight equal to 120 catties or 160 pounds (72.6 kg), alongside the picul of 100 catties. It was made obsolete by subsequent overriding legislation in 1885, which included the picul but not the stone, to avoid confusion with European-origin measures that are similarly called stone.

Following Spanish, Portuguese, British and most especially the Dutch colonial maritime trade, the term picul was both a convenient unit, and a lingua franca unit that was widely understood and employed by other Austronesians (in modern Malaysia and the Philippines) and their centuries-old trading relations with Indians, Chinese and Arabs. It remained a convenient reference unit for many commercial trade journals in the 19th century. One example is Hunts Merchant Magazine of 1859 giving detailed tables of expected prices of various commodities, such as coffee, e.g. one picul of Javanese coffee could be expected to be bought from 8 to 8.50 Spanish dollars in Batavia and Singapore.

== Definitions ==
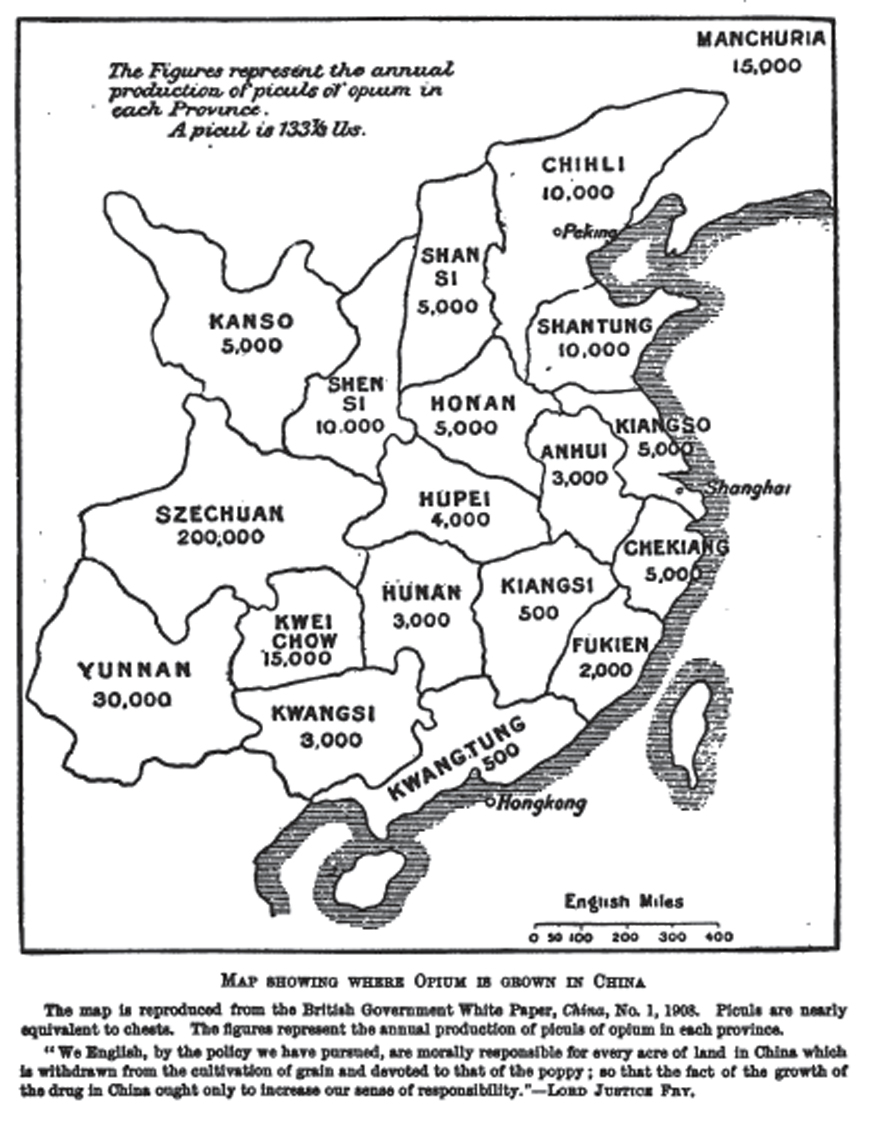
A 1903 map showing opium production in China measured in piculs

As for any traditional measurement unit, the exact definition of the picul varied historically and regionally. In imperial China and later, the unit shi/dan (picul) was used for a measure equivalent to 120 catties. This conversion was kept until the 1930 Chinese unit reform, which defined a market-catty of exactly 0.5 kilograms and a market-picul of exactly 50 kilograms. See Chinese units of measurement.

In 1831, the Dutch East Indies authorities acknowledged local variances in the definition of the pikul.

In Hong Kong, one picul was defined in Ordinance No. 22 of 1844 as 133 1/3 avoirdupois pounds, exactly 100 catties. The modern definition is exactly 60.478982 kilograms.

The measure was and remains used on occasion in Taiwan where it is defined as 60 kg. The last, a measure of rice, was 20 picul, or 1,200 kg.

== See also ==
- Dan (volume)
