= Hong Kong units of measurement =

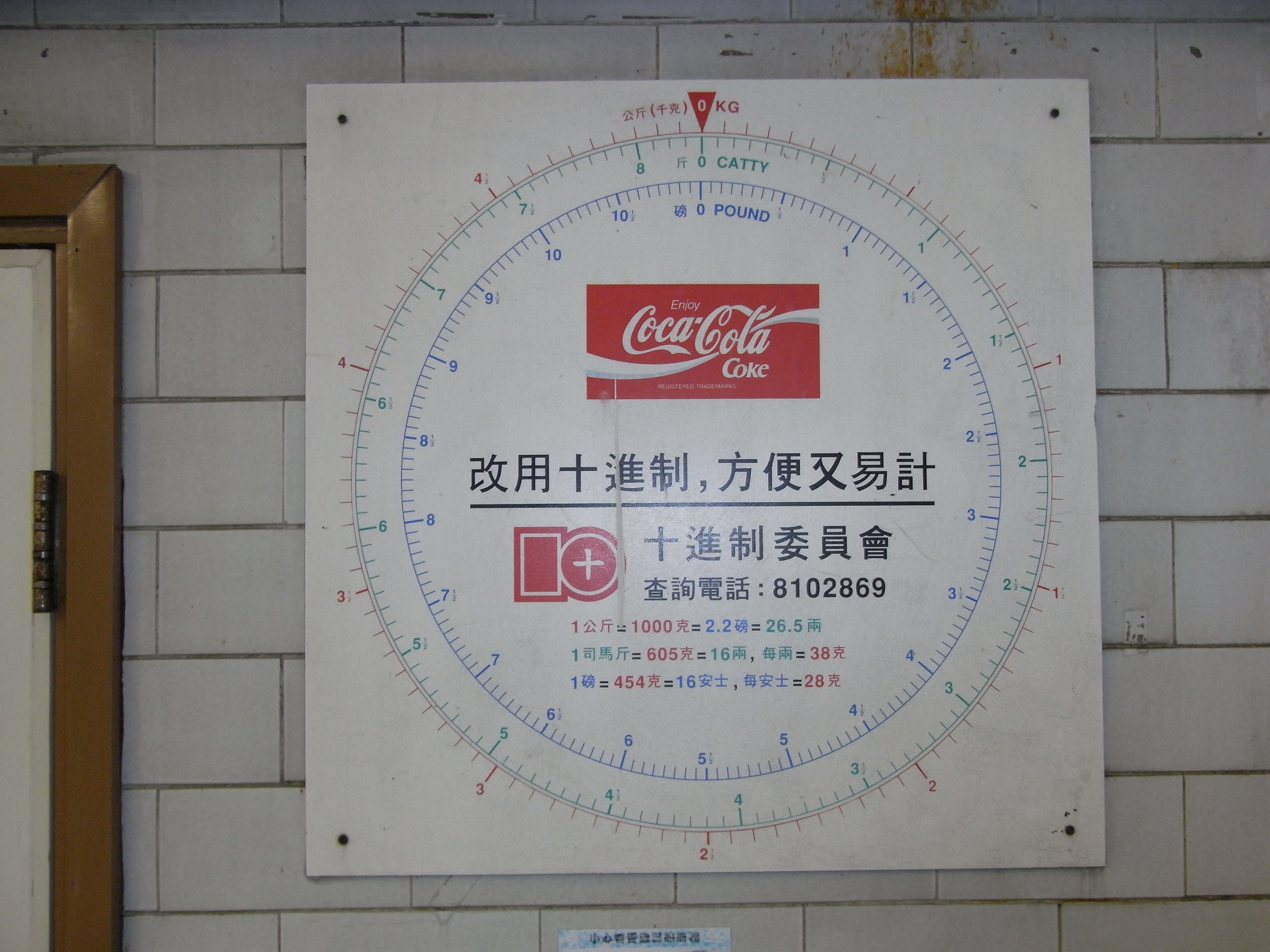
A Metrication Committee poster in Sheung Wan

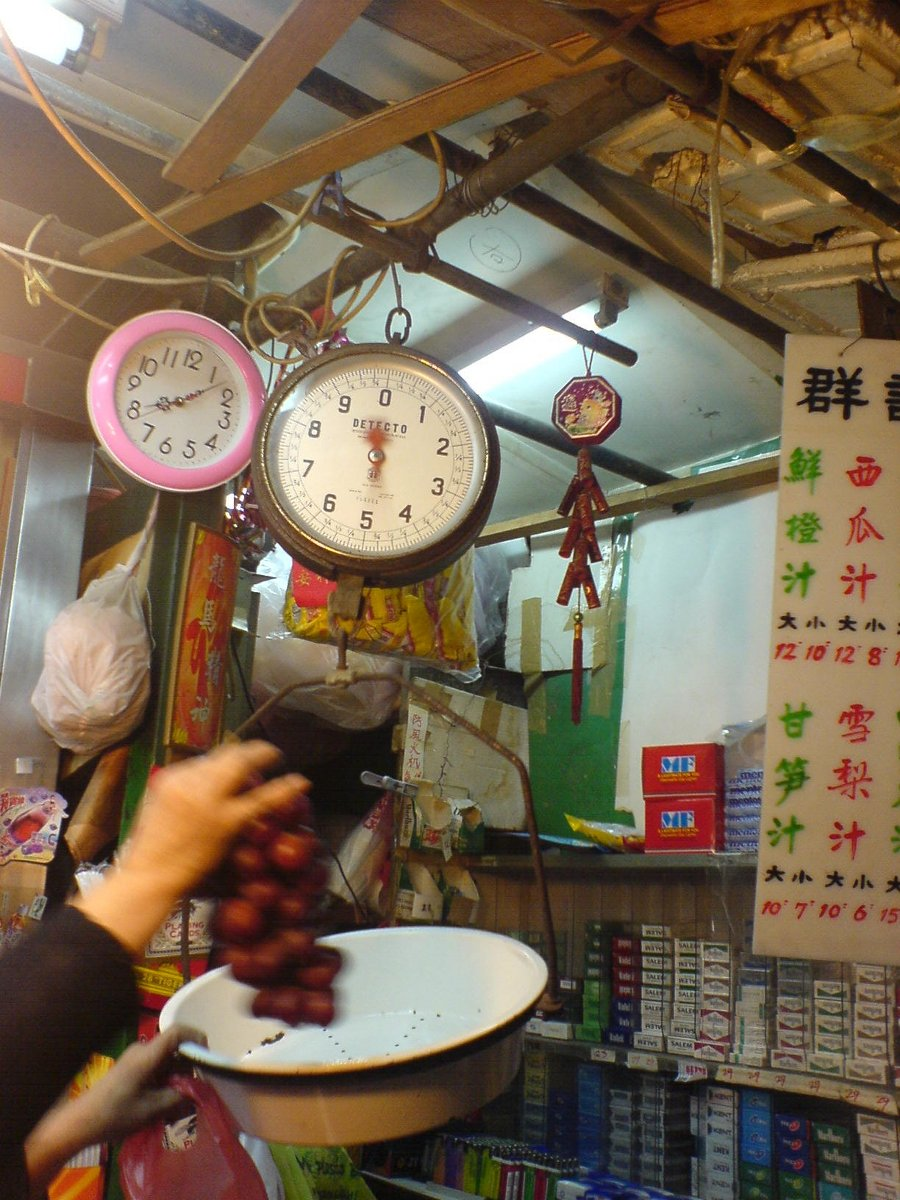
Imperial units being used to weigh fruit in a stall in Hong Kong, 2008

Hong Kong has three main systems of units of measurement in current use:

- The Chinese units of measurement of the Qing Empire (no longer in widespread use in mainland China);
- British Imperial units; and
- The metric system.

In 1976 the Hong Kong Government started the conversion to the metric system, and as of 2012 measurements for government purposes, such as road signs, are almost always in metric units. However, all three systems are officially permitted for trade, and in the wider society a mixture of all three systems prevails.

== Length ==
The metric system is used for all official purposes in Hong Kong, however, the imperial system is sometimes used in informal situations.

The Chinese system's most commonly used units were 里 (li), 丈 (tseung/cheung), 尺 (tsek/chek), 寸 (tsun/chun), 分 (fen/fan) in descending scale order. The legal units for trade include 尺, 寸 and 分 only, but they are no longer in daily use, with the words 尺 and 寸 commonly understood as the imperial measure foot (呎) and inch (吋) which are pronounced the same.

The Imperial system's units are written with the same basic Chinese characters as the Chinese system. In order to distinguish between the units of the two systems, the units can be prefixed with ying (英) for the British Imperial system and wa (華) for the Chinese system. In writing, derived characters are often used, with an additional 口 radical to the left of the original Chinese character, for writing Imperial units. The most commonly used units are the mile or li (哩), the yard or ma (碼), the foot or chek (呎), and the inch or tsun (吋).

Rulers and tapes on the market normally have dual markings in centimetres and feet and inches, which are both commonly used for body measurements.

=== Transport ===
All modern roads and railways are measured, built and signposted in the metric system.

All the imperial speed limit signs were replaced within 3 days in 25 August 1984 to 27 August 1984 upon enactment of new traffic law, with a temporary territory-wide speed limit of 50 km/h in force within that 3 days, while all remaining road signs were gradually replaced within the following 3 years.

Starting in 2001, speed limit signs showing the word km/h were gradually replaced with signs showing number only, to improve readability as drivers had already accustomed to the metric system. As a result, speed limit signs in Hong Kong now look identical to those in the UK, but with different meanings.

However, some old signs showing dual measures still exists, for example, the height restriction at the entrance of old buildings.

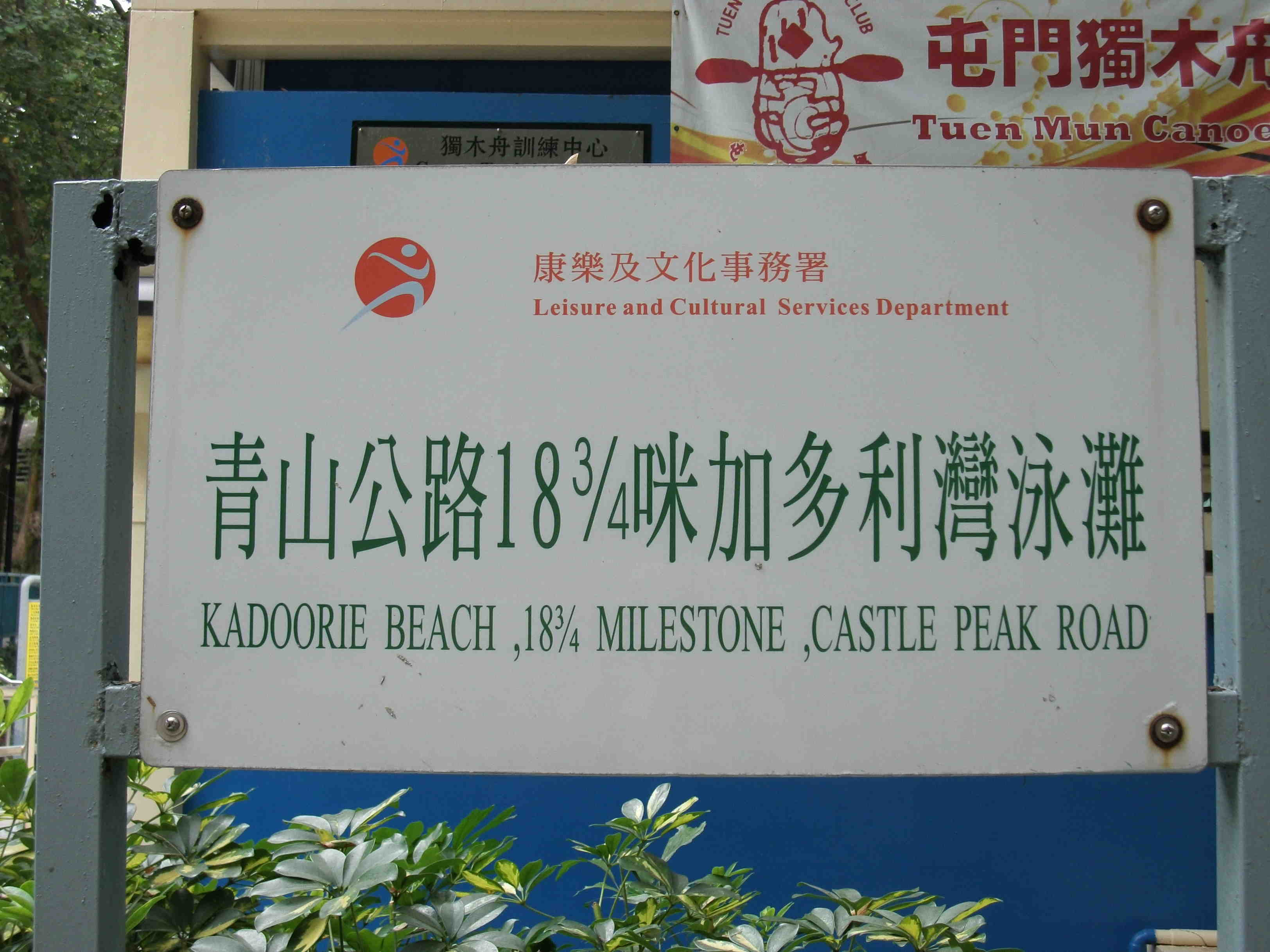
Name plate of Kadoorie Beach, showing address in miles

The old trunk roads built in the early 20th century connecting Kowloon and New Territories, including Castle Peak Road, Tai Po Road, Clear Water Bay Road, were traditionally measured in miles from Tsim Sha Tsui Star Ferry. Stone mileposts were erected along the way but they are gradually lost to time. Although this system is no longer in official use today, they are still commonly used for describing locations on the Castle Peak Road, with the Chinese character 咪, being a phonetic transcription of "mile", used instead of 哩 or 英里, and sometimes form the official address of establishments en-route (for example, the address of Kadoorie Beach is 18¾ milestone, Castle Peak Road (青山公路18¾咪)). The shopping mall of CDW Building was renamed 8½ 8咪半 after refurbishment in 2016 based on the old milestones.

When the KCR British Section was modernised and electrified in 1982, milestones were erected every approximately 500 m showing the distance from Hung Hom station in kilometres, and similarly the labels on the overhead wire masts are in kilometres as well. The signalling and signs are identical to those used in Great Britain at that time, with the speed limit signs in yellow numbers, but in km/h instead of mph used in Great Britain. All the chainage on the railways are in kilometres and metres as well.

Flight levels within Hong Kong FIR are in feet like most Western countries, in contrast to mainland China where metres are used, while on land elevations on maps are in metres.

=== Sports facilities ===
All public running tracks and swimming pools are built in metric, with running tracks having international-standard 400 m laps, and most swimming pools in international-standard 50 m length, and the smaller pools 25 m length.

The two racecourses, Happy Valley Racecourse and Sha Tin Racecourse, are marked in metres and races run in metres.

Topological maps published by the government uses the Military Grid Reference System, with squares being 1 km x 1 km in size.

== Weight ==
Chinese, Imperial and metric weight units are all used in Hong Kong. The choice of system depends on the type of goods and their origins. Metric is used for all official purposes, for example the Post Office and Road signs. Packaged food weights and volumes may be given using any of the three systems of units.

Public scales in wet markets are in all three units. These are provided to deter dishonesty by wet market merchants.

Traditional weights are still de facto standard in certain areas. For example, vegetables, meats, and Chinese medicines are usually measured in Chinese units, while some fruits are normally measured using the Imperial system.

Precious metals (gold, silver and platinum) are traded in the Chinese troy weight system, which differs from other goods.

Bathroom scales on the market are normally dual-scaled with kg and lb, while electronic ones can be switched between kg and lb. Like in the US, if imperial units are used, only lb is used in reporting body weight while stones are not used.

== Area ==
The standard commercial measure of real estate area is in square feet (方呎, 平方呎; fōng chek, pìhng fōng chek) of the Imperial system. Apartment or office size is generally still given in square feet. However, square metres are used for official purposes.

The traditional units of agricultural land area are the mau (畝, a unit used throughout China) and the local dau chung (斗種). Notionally the two units are defined differently, with the dau chung being the amount of land which could be planted by one dau (斗) of rice; in practice that area of land is roughly equal to one mau, though the exact area of a dau chung traditionally could vary based on soil quality. In Hong Kong, neither the mau nor the dau chung is a statutory unit allowed for use in trade; however, the Agriculture, Fisheries and Conservation Department continues to use the dau chung for some administrative purposes, defining it as equivalent to 7,260 square feet (674 m^{2}).

== Volume ==
In Chinese system, the measurement of volume of rice is 斗 (dau) but it is replaced by packaged rice in weight. The volume of water and fuel is the litre. The gallon (加侖, ga-lun) of the Imperial system is still occasionally used.

== Time ==
Time measurement follows the international system. Gregorian calendar is usually used, but the Chinese calendar also plays a very important role in everyday life and in telling the dates of traditional festivals.

In the following table, multiple Chinese names are listed in the order of usage frequency.

English name	Chinese name	Cantonese pronunciation	Equivalent in other units	Notes
Year (Gregorian)	年	nin4	365 or 366 days	Roughly follows a solar cycle. Historically, the Chinese refer to the return of the Sun in the winter solstice as "歲" (seoi3).
Year (Chinese)	年	nin4	12 or 13 Chinese months	In Chinese years with 13 months, the 13th month is known as the intercalary month.
Month (Gregorian)	月	jyut6	28, 29, 30 or 31 days	The Gregorian month lost the meaning of the lunar cycle.
Month (Chinese)	月	jyut6	29 or 30 days	Roughly in sync with the lunar cycle
Day	日	jat6	24 hours	
Hour	鐘 / 鐘頭 / 小時	zung1 / zung1 tau4 / siu2 si4	4 quarters or 60 minutes	"鐘" also means "clock" or "bell", which usually chimes every hour.
Quarter	骨	gwat1	15 minutes	"骨" is a loanword from English "quarter".
	字	zi6	5 minutes	"字" is very commonly used in colloquial speech, more so than "分鐘".
Minute	分鐘 / 分	fan1 zung1 / fan1	60 seconds	
Second	秒	miu5		

== Energy ==
The kilojoule or kilocalorie is the unit used for the measurement of energy in food. The British thermal unit (BTU) is still used to measure the output of air conditioners.

== Power ==
Horsepower (馬力) is still the dominant measurement for the power of cars. The Chinese counting word 匹 (pat) is the measure word in Chinese, carried over from the measure word of horses.

== See also ==
- Units, Systems, & History of measurement
- Chinese & Taiwanese units of measurement
- Japanese, Korean, & Vietnamese units of measurement
- English, Imperial, & US units of measurement
