= Dram (unit) =

Unit of mass or volume in some measurement systems

The dram (alternative British spelling drachm; apothecary symbol ʒ (Note: In Unicode, the dram symbol is represented with the same character as the lowercase letter ezh (ʒ) and the Unicode table entry for ezh has the annotation "LATIN SMALL LETTER EZH = dram sign".. That character also represented the letter yogh which has its own distinct character since Unicode version 3.0: ȝ. However, the dram symbol has had several forms, including the form of ezh with a flat top similar to a tailed z (for example, half dram, in Jean Fernel, Therapeutices Universalis, 1574), the form with a round top similar to a yogh (for example, 1 dram, in Salernitanus Nicolaus, Antidotarium, 1471) or that of the lower or upper-case letter z in Blackletter/Fraktur hand, 𝔷 or ℨ (for example, half dram, in Paracelsus, Der grossenn Wundartzney, 1537).) abbreviated dr) is a unit of mass in the avoirdupois system, and both a unit of mass and a unit of volume in the apothecaries' system. It was originally both a coin and a weight in ancient Greece. The unit of volume is more correctly called a fluid dram, fluid drachm, fluidram or fluidrachm (abbreviated fl dr, ƒ 3, or fʒ).

== Ancient unit of mass ==
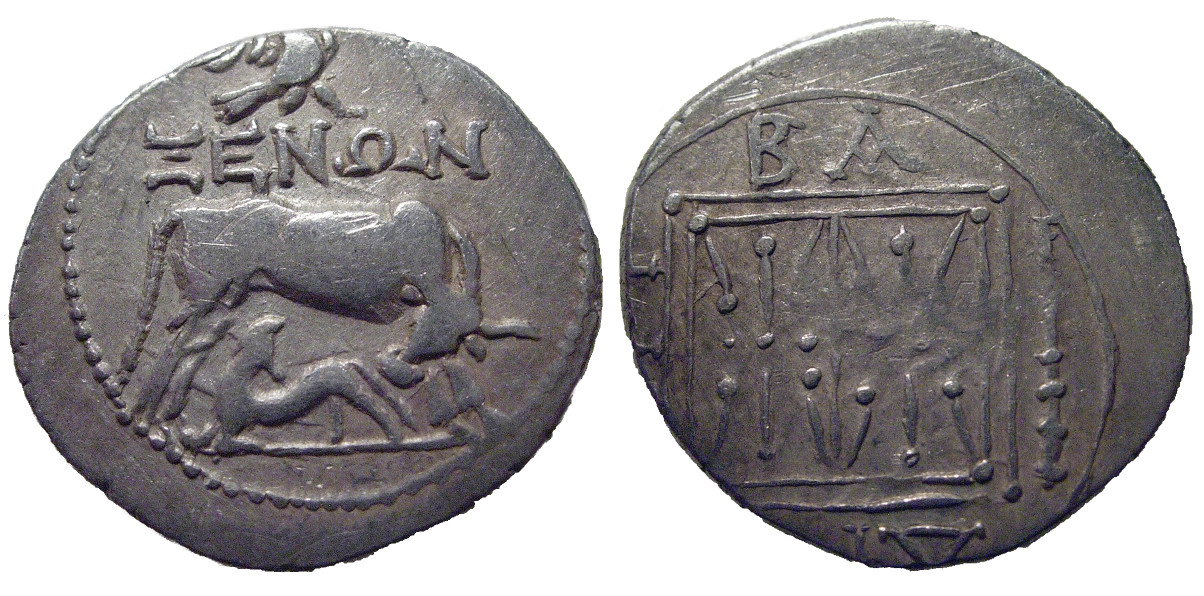
Silver Drachm from Dyrrhachium, Illyria dated c. 229 BC. Obverse: ΞΕΝΩΝ (Xenon) cow standing right, looking back at calf which it suckles, eagle standing right above; Reverse: DUR PURBA, square containing double stellate pattern, club to left. Size: 20mm; Reference: Ceka 360

- The Attic Greek drachma (δραχμή) was a weight of 6 obols, 1/100 Greek mina, or about 4.37 grams.
- The Roman drachma was a weight of 1/96 Roman pounds, or about 3.41 grams.

A coin weighing one drachma is known as a stater, drachm, or drachma. The Ottoman dirhem (Ottoman Turkish: درهم) was based on the Sassanian drachm, which was itself based on the Roman dram/drachm.

== British unit of mass ==
The British Weights and Measures Act 1878 introduced verification and consequent stamping of apothecary weights, making them officially recognized units of measurement. By 1900, Britain had enforced the distinction between the avoirdupois and apothecaries' versions by making the spelling different:

- dram now meant only avoirdupois drams, which were 1/16 of an avoirdupois ounce. An ounce consisted of 437.5 grains, thus making the dram exactly 27.34375 grains.
- drachm now meant only apothecaries' drachms, which were 1/8 of an apothecaries' ounce of 480 grains, or equal to 60 grains.

== Modern unit of mass ==
In the avoirdupois system, the dram is the mass of 1/256 pound or 1/16 ounce. The dram weighs 27 11/32 grains, or exactly 1.7718451953125 grams.

In the apothecaries' system, which was widely used in the United States until the middle of the 20th century, the dram is the mass of 1/96 pounds apothecaries (lb ap), or 1/8 ounces apothecaries (oz ap or ℥) (the pound apothecaries and ounce apothecaries are equal to the troy pound (lb t), and troy ounce (oz t), respectively). The dram apothecaries is equal to 3 scruples (s ap or ℈) or 60 grains (gr), or exactly 3.8879346 grams.

"Dram" is also used as a measure of the powder charge in a shotgun shell, representing the equivalent of black powder in drams avoirdupois.

== Unit of volume ==
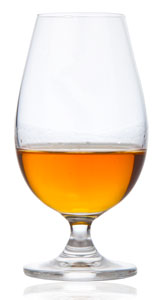
A "wee dram", in Scotland the 35 ml measurement.

The fluid dram (or fluid drachm in British spelling) is defined as 1/8 fluid ounce, and is equal to:

- 3.6966911953125 ml in the U.S. customary system
- 3.5516328125 ml in the British imperial system

In the early 19th century, a teaspoonful had been considered equal to one fluid dram—60 minims—for medical prescriptions. However, by 1876 the teaspoon had grown to 80–85 minims, making the equivalence unsuitable for medicinal dosage. Today's US teaspoon is equivalent to 4.92892159375 ml, which is also 1/6 US fluid ounces, 1 1/3 US fluid drams, or 80 US minims.

Pharmaceuticals are measured nowadays in metric units, but fluid drams are still used to measure the capacity of pill containers.

Dram is used informally to mean a small amount of liquor, especially Scotch whisky. In common usage it is an imprecise measurement of liquor in similar size to a shot with a lot of variance depending on the generosity of server. In the UK it can be more strictly defined, where in English pubs it's equivalent to 25ml, and in Scotland it's 35ml. The unit is used in the phrase dram shop, the U.S. legal term for an establishment that serves alcoholic beverages.

== In popular culture ==
The line "Where'd you get your whiskey, where'd you get your dram?" appears in some versions of the traditional pre–Civil War American song "Cindy". In the Monty Python's song "The Bruces' Philosophers Song", there is the line "Hobbes was fond of his dram". In the old-time music tradition of the United States, there is a tune entitled "Gie the Fiddler a Dram", "gie" being the Scots language word for "give", brought over by immigrants and commonly used by their descendants in Appalachia at the time of writing. "Little Maggie," a traditional song popular in bluegrass music, refers to the title character as having a "dram glass in her hand."
