= Candareen =

Traditional Asian unit of mass

Chinese name
- Chinese: 分
Transcriptions
Standard Mandarin
- Hanyu Pinyin: fēn
- Wade–Giles: fen
Yue: Cantonese
- Yale Romanization: fàn
- Jyutping: fan1
Southern Min
- Hokkien POJ: hun

Vietnamese name
- Vietnamese alphabet: phân
- Chữ Hán: 分

Korean name
- Hangul: 푼
- Hanja: 分
Transcriptions
- Revised Romanization: pun

Mongolian name
- Mongolian Cyrillic: пүн
- Mongolian script: ᠫᠦᠨ

Japanese name
- Kanji: 分
- Hiragana: ふん
Transcriptions
- Romanization: fun

Manchu name
- Manchu script: ᡶᡠᠸᡝᠨ
- Möllendorff: fuwen

A candareen or candarin (/kændəˈriːn/; Chinese: 分; pinyin: fēn; Cantonese Yale: fàn; Singapore English usage: hoon) is a traditional measurement of weight in East Asia. It is equal to 10 cash and is 1/10 of a mace. It is approximately 378 milligrams. A troy candareen is approximately 374 milligrams (5.77 gr).

In Hong Kong, one candareen is 0.3779936375 grams and, in the Weights and Measures Ordinance, it is 2/150 ounces avoirdupois. In Singapore, one candareen is 0.377994 grams.

The word candareen comes from the Malay kandūri. An earlier English form of the name was condrin. The candareen was also formerly used to describe a unit of currency in imperial China equal to 10 li (釐) and is 1/10 of a mace. The Mandarin Chinese word fēn is used to denote 1/100 of a Chinese renminbi yuan but the term candareen for that currency is now obsolete.

== Postal denomination ==
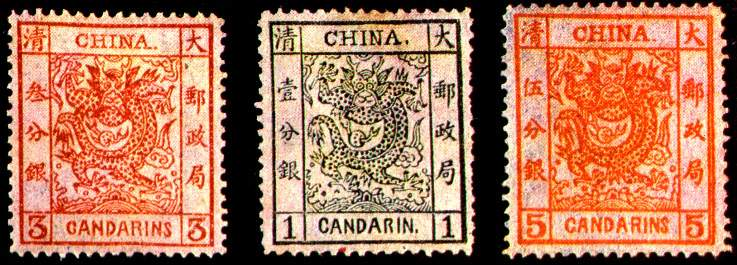
The "Large Dragons", China's first postage stamps, 1878

On 1 May 1878 the Imperial Maritime Customs was opened to the public and China's first postage stamps, the "Large Dragons" (Chinese: 大龍郵票; pinyin: dài lóng yóupiào), were issued to handle payment. The stamps were inscribed "CHINA" in both Latin and Chinese characters, and denominated in candareens.

== See also ==
- Postage stamps and postal history of China#Imperial China
- Chinese units of measurement
- Economy of China
- Economic history of China (Pre-1911)
- Economic history of China (1912–1949)
