= Si (length) =

Chinese unit of length

Si (simplified Chinese: 丝; traditional Chinese: 絲; pinyin: sī) is a traditional Chinese unit of length. One si is equal to 1/10 of a hao, 1/100 000 of a chi, or 3+1/3 μm. In the field of engineering, one si equals 10 μm.

== Present law on Chinese length units ==
Chinese measurement law in 1929, effective 1 January 1930

This law of length measurement was issued by the Chinese government in 1929, and has been effective since 1 January 1930. The base unit chi is defined to be 1/3 meter.

Table of Chinese length units effective since 1930
Pinyin	Character	Relative value	Metric value	Imperial value	Notes
sī	絲 (T) or 丝 (S)	1/(100 000)	3 1/3 μm	0.000131 in	
háo	毫	1/(10 000)	33 1/3 μm	0.00131 in	Chinese mil
lí	釐 (T) or 厘 (S)	1/1000	1/3 mm	0.0131 in	Chinese calibre
fēn	市分	1/100	3 1/3 mm	0.1312 in	Chinese line
cùn	市寸	1/10	3 1/3 cm	1.312 in	Chinese inch
chǐ	市尺	1	33 1/3 cm	13.12 in	Chinese foot
zhàng	市丈	10	3 1/3 m	3.645 yd	Chinese yard
yǐn	引	100	33 1/3 m	36.45 yd	Chinese chain
lǐ	市里	1500	500 m	546.8 yd	Chinese mile.

== Metric length units ==
These units are based on the metric system. The Chinese word for metre is 米 mǐ, which can take the Chinese standard SI prefixes (for "kilo-", "centi-", etc.). In the engineering field, traditional units are rounded up to metric units.

Table of Chinese length units in engineering
Pinyin	Character	Relative value	Metric value	Imperial value	Notes
hū	忽	1/1000000	1 μm		Authorized name: 微米
sī	絲 (T) or 丝 (S)	1/100000	10 μm		Authorized name: 忽米
háo	毫	1/10000	100 μm		Authorized name: 絲米 (T) or 丝米 (S)
lí	釐 (T) or 厘 (S)	1/1000	1 mm		Authorized name: 毫米
fēn	公分	1/100	10 mm		Authorized name: 釐米(T) or 厘米(S)
cùn	公寸	1/10	100 mm		Authorized name: 分米
chǐ	公尺	1	1 m		Authorized name: 米
Zhàng	公丈	10	10 m		Authorized name: 十米
yǐn	公引	100	100 m		Authorized name: 百米
lǐ	公里	1000	1000 m		this li is not the small li above, which has a different character and tone

== Compounds ==
- 絲毫 (sīháo)
- 一絲一毫 (yīsīyīháo)
- 一絲不苟
- 一絲 希望／一丝 希望 ― yī sī xīwàng ― a glimmer of hope.

== See also ==
- Hao (length)
- Chinese units of measurement
