= Korean units of measurement =

Traditional system of measurement used in Korea

- Korean name
- Hangul: 척관법
- Hanja: 尺貫法
- RR: cheokgwanbeop
- MR: ch'ŏkkwanpŏp
- IPA: [tɕʰʌk̚.k͈wan.p͈ʌp̚]

Korean units of measurement, called cheokgwan-beop (Korean: 척관법; Hanja: 尺貫法) or cheokgeun-beop (척근법; 尺斤法) in Korean, is the traditional system of measurement used by the people of the Korean Peninsula. It is largely based on the Chinese system, with influence from Japanese standards imposed following its annexation of the Korean Empire in 1910. Both North and South Korea currently employ the metric system. Since 2007, South Korea has criminalized the use of Korean units in commercial contexts, but informal use continues, especially of the pyeong as a measure of residential and commercial floorspace. North Korea continues to use the traditional units, although their standards are now derived from metric conversions.

== History ==
=== Ancient Korea ===
Customary Korean units are a local adaption of the traditional Chinese system, which was adopted at a very early date. They were imposed and adjusted at various times by royal statutes. The details of the system have varied over time and location in Korea's history. Standardization—to the extent it occurred—was accomplished by officially sanctioned rulers, ropes, odometers, triangulation devices, weights, cups, and basins.

Although most of the measures operate on a decimal system, the standard form was to read out the units of each place (as, e.g., 3 cheok, 1 chon, 4 bun, 1 ri) rather than list them as a single number of the largest unit (as 3.141 cheok).

=== Joseon ===
Taejo of Joseon established a Market Bureau (시사; 市司) or Bureau of Weights and Measures (평시서; 平市署) at the foundation of the Joseon dynasty in 1392. The Joseon Kingdom later attempted a standardization of length based on square brass rulers, which were used by magistrates and the secret police to fight commercial fraud. Under the Joseon, different classes of society were permitted different numbers of kan in their homes, but in its traditional sense—like the Japanese ken—of a bay between two pillars rather than as a set unit of length.

The 1496 Great Codex of State Administration (Kyŏngguk Taejŏn) included a section on approved measures and their verification. It employed a li of 360 paces or 2160 feet but did not explicitly mention that conversion until its 1746 supplement.

The 1897 Law on Weights and Measures uniting Korea's various local systems was the first legislation enacted upon the Joseon's establishment of the Korean Empire.

=== Japanese Korea ===
During the Japanese occupation from 1910 to 1945, Japan imposed its standards on Korea. Two of the most common "traditional" units in Korea—the pyeong of floorspace and the jeweler's don—were among those given their modern value by the Japanese.

=== South Korea ===
South Korea signed the Metre Convention in 1959 and notionally adopted the metric system under Park Chung Hee on 10 May 1961, with a strict law banning the use of the Korean pound, li, gwan, and don effective as of 1 January 1964 and—after metric conversion of the land registries—the pyeong. The metrication was not applied to imported or exported goods and remained so generally spotty as to be considered a failure, with the government abandoning its attempts to enforce the statute by 1970. The traditional units feature in many Korean sayings (Note: See, e.g., the proverbs on the importance of flattery and lying in Lee.) and much of its literature and poetry, including the national anthem, which mentions Korea's "three thousand lis of rivers and mountains". Further attempts to fully metricate occurred in 1983, 2000, and 2001, with publicity campaigns praising the metric system and condemning traditional units through TV and radio ads, brochures, signs, and contests. A common theme was the origin of the present values of the units under Japanese occupation; Yun Byeong-su of the Korea Association of Standards & Testing Organizations noted that "even Japan has forsaken the don for the units of grams and ounces but here we are standing around like idiots still blathering on about don." Nonetheless, strong opposition from the construction and jewelry industries and negative media coverage forced Korean politicians to avoid the topic and regulators to settle for dual use of conventional and metric measures.

A 2006 study found 88% of real estate companies and 71% of jewelers in 7 major markets were still using the pyeong and don, after which the government decided simply to criminalize further commercial use of traditional units. (Another important factor was the European Union regulation mandating the use of metric in all imported goods by 2010.) The sale of rulers marking Korean feet was ended and a Measure Act effective 1 July 2007 empowered the Korean Agency for Technology and Standards of the Ministry of Commerce to begin immediately levying fines of up to ₩500,000 for commercial use of the pyeong and don, with less common units enjoying a longer grace period. The ban also included use of American units, such as describing the display size of televisions and computer monitors in terms of inches. (Note: A particular exception to this policy was made for the continued use of pounds for bowling ball sizes and yards on golf courses, owing to the international conventions of those sports.) The "serving size" used as an informal and variable measure of meat cuts was standardized to 100 g. Knowledge of the fine remained low for years, and it was later increased to a maximum of ₩1,000,000 (about $800) for users of illegal units and ₩3,000,000 for sellers of measuring devices marked with unapproved units. South Korea's measurement standards are now maintained by the Korea Research Institute of Standards and Science.

Despite this strong official discouragement, some use continues in retail, manufacturing, and farming. Even among those who have adopted metric units, informal use of awkward metric fractions equivalent to round amounts of the former units is common, especially with regard to the very common pyeong of floorspace. (Such treatment was avoided in the gold market by laws requiring pricing and denomination in even amounts of grams.) Another dodge has been to treat the traditional units as a nondescript 'unit', such as marketing an air conditioner appropriate for a 20 py home as a "20-Type".

=== North Korea ===
Despite the importance of the Soviet Union in establishing North Korea, Kim Il Sung continued official use of Korean units until the DPRK's notional metrication under National Standard 4077–75 on 14 April 1975. (Note: This standard was subsequently superseded by National Standard 4077–91 in 1991, but that standard continued the use of the metric system as well.) It joined the Meter Treaty in 1982 or 1989, although it was removed from the International Bureau for Weights and Measures and related organizations in 2012 for its years of failure to pay the necessary fees. North Korea has long used the metric system in its state-run media and international publications, but continues to use traditional units alongside the metric system in sectors approved by the government. North Korea's standards are administered by the Central Institute of Metrology under the State Administration of Quality Management in accordance with the Law on Metrology ratified by the Supreme People's Assembly on 3 February 1993. North Korea uses the pyeong in various regulations, such as the 50 py per person allowed for private farming in 1987, despite guides who disparage the unit as a historical relic of the South to foreign tourists visiting the country. The metric system is thought not to have spread to domestic factories or stores prior to Kim Jong Un's metrification initiative, announced in May 2013. The change was part of Kim's policy of stressing the importance of science and technology and its "universal trends". His announcement in the state-run quarterly Cultural Language Study said that increasing use of the metric system would "strengthen international exchange and cooperation... in the fields of industry, science, and technology and even in the area of general social life".

== Length ==
The base unit of Korean length is the foot, with other units changing over time based on its dimensions and multiples. Different ancient Korean kingdoms had different exact measurements; that of Sejong the Great (r. 1418–1450) was 31.22 cm. Under the early Joseon Kingdom, the value of the foot varied by trade, with different lengths used for the carpentry foot and the fabric foot.

The biggest difference between the traditional Korean and Chinese units of length is that the Korean equivalent of the bu uses a different character and its pre-Tang composition of six Korean feet rather than five. (The bu was usually treated as a synonym of this unit within Korea but sometimes distinguished as a length of 4 feet). In 369 CE, during the reign of King Geunchogo of Baekje, his realm seems to have used a foot of about 28.85 cm.

The Korean li previously bore values around 434.16 m (3rd century), 531.18 m (6th–7th), 559.8 m (7th–10th), 552.96 m (10th–14th), and 450 m (19th); it was also reckoned based on travel time and therefore varied in length between the plains and mountains. It was standardized as 1/10 of the Japanese ri of 3 51/55 km in 1905. (Note: Both the 1955 and 1966 editions of the UN's report on national measurement systems report the Korean li as precisely equal to the Japanese ri, but this seems to be in error.)

Romanization			Korean	English	Equivalents		
RR	MR	Other	Korean	English	Korean feet	China/Japan	Metric
Ho	Ho		호(毫)		1/10000		0.0303 mm (0.00119 in)
Mo	Mo		모(毛)		1/10000		0.0303 mm (0.00119 in)
Ri	Ri		리(釐/厘)		1/1000		0.303 mm (0.0119 in)
Pun	P'un	Poun (Note: Bernadou, however, describes his "poun" as 1/10 rather than 1/100 of the Korean foot.)	푼		1/100		0.30 cm (0.12 in)
Bun	Pun		분(分)		1/100		0.30 cm (0.12 in)
Chi	Ch'i		치	Korean inch	1/10	Cun	3.03 cm (1.19 in)
Chon	Ch'on		촌(寸)	Korean inch	1/10	Cun	3.03 cm (1.19 in)
Ja	Cha		자	Korean foot	1	Chi, Shaku	30.3 cm (11.9 in) (Note: Fessley gives the mistaken conversion 11.8 in.)
Cheok	Ch'ŏk	Chok	척(尺)	Korean foot	1	Chi, Shaku	30.3 cm (11.9 in)
Gan	Kan		간(間)	Korean pace	6	Ken	181.8 cm (71.6 in)
Bo	Po		보(步)	Korean pace	6	Ken	181.8 cm (71.6 in)
Jang	Chang		장(丈)	Korean fathom	10	Zhang	3.03 m (9.9 ft)
Jeong	Chŏng	Chung	정(町)		360		109.08 m (357.9 ft)
Ri	Ri	Li	리(里)	Korean mile	1296	Li	0.393 km (0.244 mi) (Note: Although this is very close to 1/4 mile, Fessley gives the mistaken conversion 1/3 mile.)

== Area ==
The base unit of Korean area is the pyeong, equivalent to a square kan or 36 square Korean feet. It comprised about 3.158 m^{2} during Korea's Three Kingdoms Era; the present value derives from the units established by the Japanese. Despite being notionally illegal, the pyeong remains particularly common when discussing residential and commercial floorspace and tiles. A separate pyeong of 0.09 m^{2} was used for selling glass. The floorspace pyeong is still prevalent enough that it continues to be glossed in the government's promotional material for foreign investors.

Farms and large estates were formerly generally measured in majigi, which is notionally not based on multiples of the pyeong but on the amount of land suitable for the planting of one mall of rice or grain seed. In practice, it was standardized to the pyeong system but varied in size from province to province based on the average richness of their soil.

Romanization			Korean	English	Equivalents		
RR	MR	Other	Korean	English	Pyeong	Other countries	Global
Jak	Chak		작(勺)		1/100		0.0330579 m^{2} (0.355832 sq ft)
Hop	Hop		홉		1/10		0.33058 m^{2} (3.5583 sq ft)
Pyeong	P'yŏng	Pyong; Pyung	평(坪)	Py	1		3.3058 m^{2} (35.583 sq ft) (Note: Although this is equivalent to about 1/1224 acre, Fessley gives the mistaken conversion 1/1213.541 acre.)
Gan	Kan		간(間)	Py	1		3.3058 m^{2} (35.583 sq ft)
Bo	Po		보(步)	Py	1		3.3058 m^{2} (35.583 sq ft)
Myo	Myo		묘(畝)		30		99.174 m^{2} (1,067.50 sq ft)
Dan	Tan		단(段)		300		991.74 m^{2} (10,675.0 sq ft)
Danbo	Tanbo		단보(段步)		300		991.74 m^{2} (10,675.0 sq ft)
Jeong	Chŏng		정(町)		3000		9,917.4 m^{2} (106,750 sq ft)
Jeongbo	Chŏngbo	Chungbo	정보(町步)		3000		9,917.4 m^{2} (106,750 sq ft)
Gyeong	Kyŏng		경(頃)		3000		9,917.4 m^{2} (106,750 sq ft)
Romanization			Korean	Explanation	Equivalents		
RR	MR	Other	Korean	Explanation	Majigi	Pyeong	Global
Doejigi	Toejigi		되지기	Land for planting a doe of seeds.	1/10	15‒30 (paddy field), 10 (other field)	49.59–99.17 m^{2} (533.8–1,067.5 sq ft) paddy field 33.06 m^{2} (355.9 sq ft) other field
Majigi	Majigi		마지기	Land for planting a mal of seeds. (Note: At the time of Korea's full metrification, a majigi was reckoned as 495 m^{2} in Gyeonggi Province, 660 m^{2} in Chungcheong and some parts of Gangwon, and 990 m^{2} in other parts of Gangwon. A similarly variable unit was the gyeol or kyŏl (결 or 結), whose size ran 2.2–9 acres (8,903–36,422 m^{2}) depending upon the fertility of the land.)	1	150‒300 (paddy field), 100 (other field)	495.87–991.74 m^{2} (5,337.5–10,675.0 sq ft) paddy field 330.58 m^{2} (3,558.3 sq ft) other field
Durak	Turak		두락(斗落)	Land for planting a mal of seeds.	1	150‒300 (paddy field), 100 (other field)	495.87–991.74 m^{2} (5,337.5–10,675.0 sq ft) paddy field 330.58 m^{2} (3,558.3 sq ft) other field
Seomjigi	Sŏmjigi		섬지기	Land for planting a seom of seeds.	10	2,000 (paddy field), 1,000 (other field)	6,611.57 m^{2} (71,166.3 sq ft) paddy field 3,305.79 m^{2} (35,583.2 sq ft) other field

== Weight ==
The base unit of Korean weight is the gwan. At the time of Korea's metrification, however, the Geun was in more common use. Although it was usually taken as equivalent to 600 g, as with red pepper and meats, a separate pound of 400 g was used for fruits and another of 375 or 200 g was used for vegetables. The nyang also sees some use among Korea's vendors of traditional Chinese medicine.

The "bag" (kama) was a variable unit usually figured as 54 kg of unhusked rice or 60 kg of polished rice, although 90 kg "bags" were also used.

Romanization			Korean	English	Equivalents		
RR	MR	Other	Korean	English	Gwan	Other countries	Global
Ho	Ho		호(毫)		1/1,000,000		3.75 mg (0.0579 gr)
Mo	Mo		모(毛)		1/1,000,000		3.75 mg (0.0579 gr)
Ri	Ri		리(釐/厘)		1/100,000		0.0375 g (0.00132 oz)
Pun	P'un		푼		1/10,000		0.375 g (0.0132 oz)
Bun	Pun		분(分)		1/10,000		0.375 g (0.0132 oz)
Don	Ton		돈		1/1,000	Momme	3.75 g (0.132 oz) (Note: Fessley gives the value 32.8 gr.)
Nyang	Nyang	RyangYang	냥(兩)	Korean ounce	1/100	Tael	37.5 g (1.32 oz) (Note: Fessley gives the value 3/4 oz.) (Note: Grayson gives 37.3 g.)
Geun	Kŭn	Keun Kon	근(斤)	Korean pound	4/25 (meat), 1/10 (others)	Catty	600 g (21 oz) (meat), (Note: Fessley gives the mistaken conversion 1 lb 3.2 oz.)375 g (13.2 oz) (others)
Gwan	Kwan		관(貫)		1		3.75 kg (8.3 lb)

== Volume ==
The base unit of Korean volume or capacity is the doi.

In 3rd-century Gaya, the mal was reckoned at about 2 L, the size of the present-day doe. In the early 17th century, the Joseon picul was reckoned as 15 or 20 mal, but similarly only comprised 89.464 or 119.285 L owing to the smaller size of the mal at that time.

Romanization			Korean	English	Equivalents		
RR	MR	Other	Korean	English	Doe	Other countries	Global
Jak	Chak		작(勺)		1/100		18 mL (0.63 imp fl oz; 0.61 US fl oz)
Hop	Hop		홉		1/10	Ge	180 mL (6.3 imp fl oz; 6.1 US fl oz) (Note: The variant figures in Fessley and the UN reports are based on the imperial measuring system.)
Doe	Toe	Doi; Dwe	되	Korean Peck	1	Sheng	1.8 L (0.40 imp gal; 0.48 US gal) (Note: imp)
Seung	Sŭng		승(升)	Korean Peck	1	Sheng	1.8 L (0.40 imp gal; 0.48 US gal)
Mal	Mal		말	Korean Bushel	10		18 L (4.0 imp gal; 4.8 US gal) (Note: imp)
Du	Tu		두(斗)	Korean Bushel	10		18 L (4.0 imp gal; 4.8 US gal)
Seom	Sŏm		섬	Korean Picul	100	Picul	180 L (40 imp gal; 48 US gal) (Note: imp)
Seok	Sŏk	Suk	석(石)	Korean Picul	100	Picul	180 L (40 imp gal; 48 US gal)
Jeom	Chŏm		점(苫)	Korean Picul	100	Picul	180 L (40 imp gal; 48 US gal)
Sogok	Sogok		소곡(小斛)		150		270 L (59 imp gal; 71 US gal)
Pyeongseok	P'yŏngsŏk		평석(平石)		150		270 L (59 imp gal; 71 US gal)
Daegok	Taegok		대곡(大斛)		200		360 L (79 imp gal; 95 US gal)
Jeonseok	Chŏnsŏk		전석(全石)		200		360 L (79 imp gal; 95 US gal)

The United Nations also reported a "small mal" half the size of the standard mal. In contexts involving volume, two cubic forms of "pyeong" were also formerly used. The pyeong of gravel was a cubic gan (about 6.01 m^{3}); the pyeong of firewood was 1/3 as much (about 2.0035 m^{3}). Palais reports alternate seoks of 15 and 20 mal each.

== See also ==
- Metric system
- Chinese, Taiwanese, Hong Kong, Japanese, Mongolian & Vietnamese units of measurement
- Korean units of currency
- KATS, KSA, KRISS, & KASTO, South Korean standards organizations
- CIM & SAQM, North Korean standards organizations
