= Fen (disambiguation) =

A fen is a type of wetland.

Fen, Fenn, Fens, Fenns, may also refer to:

== People ==
- Fen (name), a Chinese given name and surname
- Fen Cresswell (1915–1966), New Zealand cricketer
- Fen McDonald (1891–1915), Australian rules footballer
- Kees Fens (1920–2008), Dutch writer
- Vitaly Fen (born c. 1947), Uzbekistani diplomat

== Places ==
- Back Bay Fens, a park in Boston, Massachusetts
- The Fens, a low-lying geographical region of eastern England
- Fenns, Indiana, an unincorporated community
- Fen Complex, Norway, an area of unusual igneous rocks
- Fen Prefecture, a region of Imperial China
- Fen River, in China
- Fenn College, predecessor of Cleveland State University
- Fenn Tower, building on the campus of Cleveland State University
- Fenn's Moss, part of a British nature reserve

== Chinese units of measurement ==
- Fen (currency), 分, a unit of the renminbi, the currency of China
- Fen (land), 分, a Chinese unit of land area
- Fen (length), 分, a Chinese unit of length

== Other uses ==
- Fen (band), a British metal band
- Fen (play), a play by the British playwright Caryl Churchill
- Far East Network, a network of American military radio and television stations
- Federation of European Neuroscience Societies (FENS), a scholarly federation
- Fen TV, a Bulgarian television channel
- Fenny Stratford railway station, in England
- Fernando de Noronha Airport, in Brazil
- Festival of New Songs, a Slovenian music festival
- Final Exit Network (FEN), an American right-to-die advocacy group
- Flap endonuclease
- Forsyth–Edwards Notation (FEN) for chess positions
- Fédération des Étudiants Nationalistes (FEN), a defunct French far-right students' association
- Fen or three-legged turtle from Chinese mythology
- FAA Enterprise Network Services (FENS) of the Federal Aviation Administration
