= Yin (length) =

Chinese unit of length

The Yin (Chinese: 引; pinyin: yǐn) in Mandarin, or jan in Cantonese, is a traditional Chinese unit of length. One yin equals 1/15 of a li, 10 zhang, or 33+1/3 m in China.

== Chinese length units promulgated in 1915 ==
Chinese measurement law in 1915

Table of Chinese length units promulgated in 1915
Pinyin	Character	Relative value	Metric value	Imperial value	Notes
háo	毫	1/10000	32 μm	0.00126 in	
lí	釐 (T) or 厘 (S)	1/1000	0.32 mm	0.0126 in	
fēn	分	1/100	3.2 mm	0.126 in	
cùn	寸	1/10	32 mm	1.26 in	Chinese inch
chǐ	尺	1	0.32 m	12.6 in	Chinese foot
bù	步	5	1.6 m	5.2 ft	Chinese pace
zhàng	丈	10	3.2 m	3.50 yd	Chinese yard
yǐn	引	100	32 m	35.0 yd	
lǐ	里	1800	576 m	630 yd	Chinese mile, this li is not the small li above, which has a different character and tone

== Present law on Chinese length units ==
Chinese measurement law in 1929, effective 1 January 1930

This law of length measurement was issued by the Chinese government in 1929, and has been effective since 1 January, 1930. The base unit chi is defined to be 1/3 meter.

Table of Chinese length units effective since 1930
Pinyin	Character	Relative value	Metric value	Imperial value	Notes
háo	毫	1/(10 000)	33 1/3 μm	0.00131 in	Chinese mil
lí	釐 (T) or 厘 (S)	1/1000	1/3 mm	0.0131 in	Chinese calibre
fēn	市分	1/100	3 1/3 mm	0.1312 in	Chinese line
cùn	市寸	1/10	3 1/3 cm	1.312 in	Chinese inch
chǐ	市尺	1	33 1/3 cm	13.12 in	Chinese foot
zhàng	市丈	10	3 1/3 m	3.645 yd	Chinese yard
yǐn	引	100	33 1/3 m	36.45 yd	Chinese chain
lǐ	市里	1500	500 m	546.8 yd	Chinese mile, this li is not the small li above, which has a different character and tone

== Chinese length units in engineering ==
These units are based on the metric system. The Chinese word for metre is 米 mǐ, which can take the Chinese standard SI prefixes (for "kilo-", "centi-", etc.). In the engineering field, traditional units are rounded up to metric units.

Table of Chinese length units in engineering
Pinyin	Character	Relative value	Metric value	Imperial value	Notes
hū	忽	1/1000000	1 μm		Authorized name: 微米
sī	絲 (T) or 丝 (S)	1/100000	10 μm		Authorized name: 忽米
háo	毫	1/10000	100 μm		Authorized name: 絲米 (T) or 丝米 (S)
lí	釐 (T) or 厘 (S)	1/1000	1 mm		Authorized name: 毫米
fēn	公分	1/100	10 mm		Authorized name: 釐米(T) or 厘米(S)
cùn	公寸	1/10	100 mm		Authorized name: 分米
chǐ	公尺	1	1 m		Authorized name: 米
Zhàng	公丈	10	10 m		Authorized name: 十米
yǐn	公引	100	100 m		Authorized name: 百米
lǐ	公里	1000	1000 m		this li is not the small li above, which has a different character and tone

== See also ==
- Zhang (unit)
- Chinese units of measurement
