= Fen (length) =

Chinese unit of length

The fen (Chinese: 分; pinyin: fēn) in Mandarin, fan in Cantonese or hun in Taiwanese, is a traditional Chinese unit of length. One fen equals 1/10 of a cun or 1/100 of a chi. It is 3+1/3 mm in China mainland, 3.71475 mm in Hong Kong and 3.030 mm in Taiwan.

== China mainland ==
Table of Chinese length units effective since 1930
Pinyin	Character	Relative value	Metric value	Imperial value	Notes
háo	毫	1/(10 000)	33 1/3 μm	0.00131 in	Chinese mil
lí	釐 (T) or 厘 (S)	1/1000	1/3 mm	0.0131 in	Chinese calibre
fēn	市分	1/100	3 1/3 mm	0.1312 in	Chinese line
cùn	市寸	1/10	3 1/3 cm	1.312 in	Chinese inch
chǐ	市尺	1	33 1/3 cm	13.12 in	Chinese foot
zhàng	市丈	10	3 1/3 m	3.645 yd	Chinese yard
yǐn	引	100	33 1/3 m	36.45 yd	Chinese chain
lǐ	市里	1500	500 m	546.8 yd	Chinese mile, this li is not the small li above, which has a different character and tone

== Hong Kong and Macau ==
Table of Chinese length units in Hong Kong and Macau
Jyutping	Character	English	Portuguese	Relative value	Metric value	Imperial value	Notes
fan1	分	fen, fan	condorim	1/100	3.71475 mm	0.1463 in	
cyun3	寸	cun, tsun	ponto	1/10	37.1475 mm	1.463 in	Hong Kong and Macau inch
cek3	尺	chi, chek	côvado	1	371.475 mm	1.219 ft	Hong Kong and Macau foot

These correspond to the measures listed simply as "China" in The Measures, Weights, & Moneys of All Nations.

== Taiwan ==
Length measure in Taiwan is largely metric but some units derived from traditional Japanese units of measurement remain in use as a legacy of Japanese rule.

Table of Traditional Chinese Length Units since 1930
Unit				Taiwanese feet	Metric		US & Imperial		Notes
Taiwanese Hokkien	Hakka	Mandarin	Character	Taiwanese feet	Exact	Approx.	Exact	Approx.	Notes
Hun	Fûn	Fēn	分	1/100	1/330 m	3.030 mm	125/37,719 yd	0.1193 in	Same as Japanese Bu
Chhùn	Chhun	Cùn	寸	1/10	1/33 m	3.030 cm	1250/37,719 yd	1.193 in	Taiwanese inch; Same as Japanese Sun
Chhioh	Chhak	Chǐ	尺	1	10/33 m	30.30 cm	12,500/37,719 yd	11.93 in	Taiwanese foot; Same as Japanese Shaku
Tn̄g	Chhong	Zhàng	丈	10	100/33 m	3.030 m	125,000/37,719 yd	9 ft 11.3 in	Taiwanese fathom; Same as Japanese Jō

Taiwanese length units and the translation of length units in metric system (SI) shares the same character. The adjective Taiwanese (台) can be added to address the Taiwanese unis system. For example, 台尺 means Taiwanese foot and 公尺 means meter.

== Compounds ==
- "分寸" is a Chinese word which literally means fen and cun, two traditional Chinese units of length; figuratively, it refers to the sense of propriety, or the proper degree for saying or doing something. For example, "说话要注意分寸。" (Pay attention to the sense of propriety in speaking.)

== See also ==
- Fen (land)
- Chinese units of measurement
- Taiwanese units of measurement
- Hong Kong units of measurement
