= Hao (length) =

Chinese unit of length

The Hao (Chinese: 毫; pinyin: háo) in Mandarin, or hou in Cantonese, is a traditional Chinese unit of length. One hao equals 1/10 of a li, 1/10000 of a chi, or 33+1/3 μm.

== Chinese length units promulgated in 1915 ==
Chinese measurement law in 1915

Table of Chinese length units promulgated in 1915
| Pinyin | Character | Relative value | Metric value | Imperial value | Notes |
|---|---|---|---|---|---|
| háo | 毫 | 1/10000 | 32 μm | 0.00126 in | |
| lí | 釐 (T) or 厘 (S) | 1/1000 | 0.32 mm | 0.0126 in | |
| fēn | 分 | 1/100 | 3.2 mm | 0.126 in | |
| cùn | 寸 | 1/10 | 32 mm | 1.26 in | Chinese inch |
| chǐ | 尺 | 1 | 0.32 m | 12.6 in | Chinese foot |
| bù | 步 | 5 | 1.6 m | 5.2 ft | Chinese pace |
| zhàng | 丈 | 10 | 3.2 m | 3.50 yd | Chinese yard |
| yǐn | 引 | 100 | 32 m | 35.0 yd | |
| lǐ | 里 | 1800 | 576 m | 630 yd | Chinese mile, this li is not the small li above, which has a different character and tone |

== Present law on Chinese length units ==
Chinese measurement law in 1929, effective 1 January 1930

This law of length measurement was issued by the Chinese government in 1929, and has been effective since 1 January 1930. The base unit chi is defined to be 1/3 meter.

Table of Chinese length units effective since 1930
| Pinyin | Character | Relative value | Metric value | Imperial value | Notes |
|---|---|---|---|---|---|
| háo | 毫 | 1/(10 000) | 33 1/3 μm | 0.00131 in | Chinese mil |
| lí | 釐 (T) or 厘 (S) | 1/1000 | 1/3 mm | 0.0131 in | Chinese calibre |
| fēn | 市分 | 1/100 | 3 1/3 mm | 0.1312 in | Chinese line |
| cùn | 市寸 | 1/10 | 3 1/3 cm | 1.312 in | Chinese inch |
| chǐ | 市尺 | 1 | 33 1/3 cm | 13.12 in | Chinese foot |
| zhàng | 市丈 | 10 | 3 1/3 m | 3.645 yd | Chinese yard |
| yǐn | 引 | 100 | 33 1/3 m | 36.45 yd | Chinese chain |
| lǐ | 市里 | 1500 | 500 m | 546.8 yd | Chinese mile, this li is not the small li above, which has a different character and tone |

== Chinese length units in engineering ==
These units are based on the metric system. The Chinese word for metre is 米 mǐ, which can take the Chinese standard SI prefixes (for "kilo-", "centi-", etc.). In the engineering field, traditional units are rounded up to metric units.

Table of Chinese length units in engineering
| Pinyin | Character | Relative value | Metric value | Imperial value | Notes |
|---|---|---|---|---|---|
| hū | 忽 | 1/1000000 | 1 μm | | Authorized name: 微米 |
| sī | 絲 (T) or 丝 (S) | 1/100000 | 10 μm | | Authorized name: 忽米 |
| háo | 毫 | 1/10000 | 100 μm | | Authorized name: 絲米 (T) or 丝米 (S) |
| lí | 釐 (T) or 厘 (S) | 1/1000 | 1 mm | | Authorized name: 毫米 |
| fēn | 公分 | 1/100 | 10 mm | | Authorized name: 釐米(T) or 厘米(S) |
| cùn | 公寸 | 1/10 | 100 mm | | Authorized name: 分米 |
| chǐ | 公尺 | 1 | 1 m | | Authorized name: 米 |
| Zhàng | 公丈 | 10 | 10 m | | Authorized name: 十米 |
| yǐn | 公引 | 100 | 100 m | | Authorized name: 百米 |
| lǐ | 公里 | 1000 | 1000 m | | this li is not the small li above, which has a different character and tone |

== Compounds ==
- 絲毫 (sīháo)
- 一絲一毫 (yīsīyīháo)
- 差之毫釐，謬以千里 (chāzhīháolí, miùyǐqiānlǐ)

== See also ==
- Li (short)
- Chinese units of measurement
