= Red Hare =

Horse of Lu Bu, Chinese Warlord during Three Kingdom period

- Traditional Chinese: 赤兔馬
- Simplified Chinese: 赤兔马
- Literal meaning: Red hare horse
Transcriptions
Standard Mandarin
- Hanyu Pinyin: chì tù mǎ

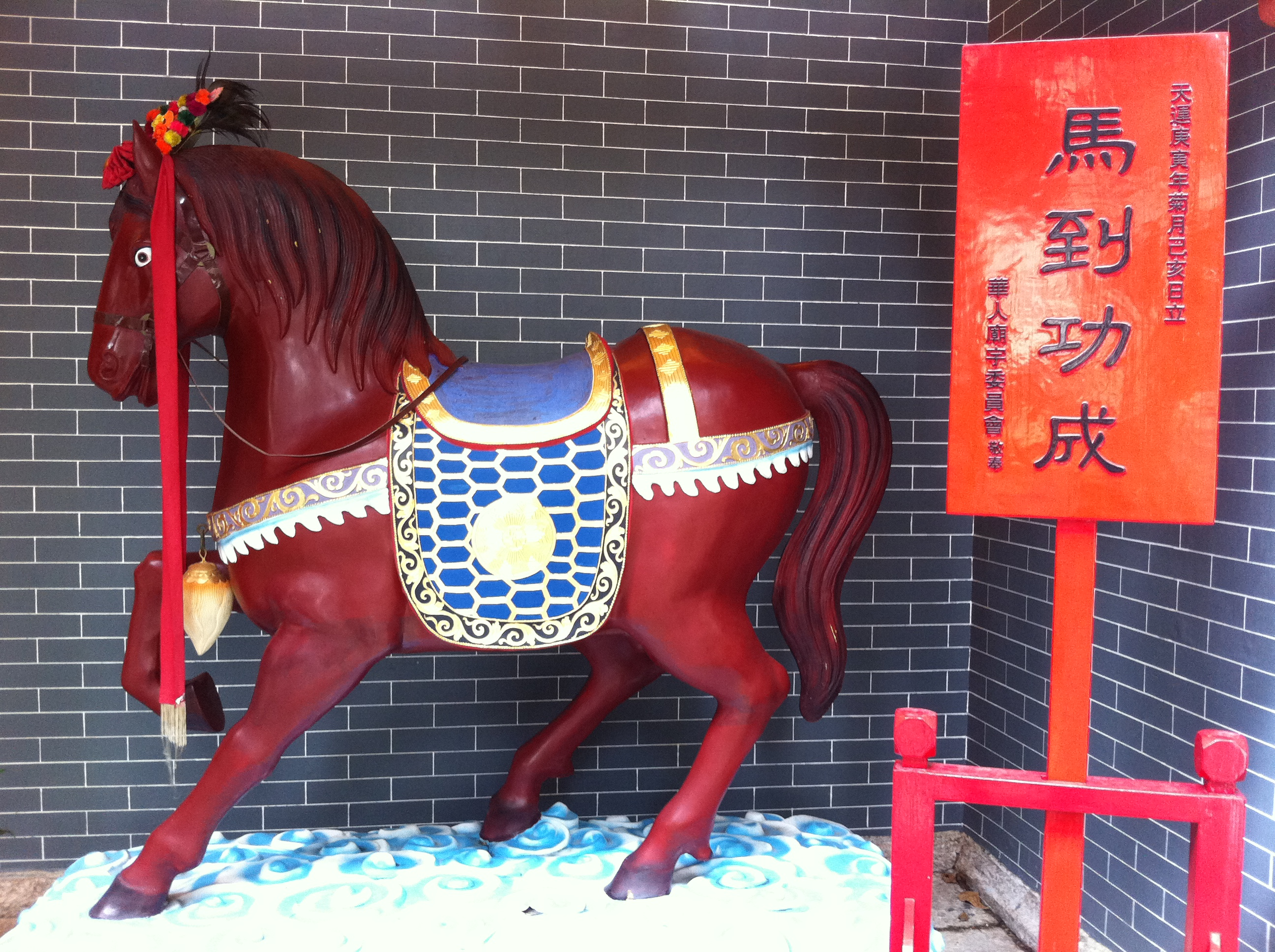
A statue of the Red Hare in front of the Mo Tai Temple in Sham Shui Po, Hong Kong

The Red Hare or Chi Tu (Chinese: 赤兔馬; pinyin: chì tù mǎ) was a famous horse owned by the warlord Lü Bu, who lived during the late Eastern Han dynasty of China.

In Romance of the Three Kingdoms it is later owned by Guan Yu which was gifted by Cao Cao.

== In historical records ==
The Red Hare was mentioned in Lü Bu's biographies in the historical texts Records of the Three Kingdoms and Book of the Later Han. It was described as very powerful and capable of "galloping across cities and leaping over moats". Lü Bu rode this horse in 193 during a battle in Changshan (常山; around present-day Shijiazhuang, Hebei), in which he helped another warlord Yuan Shao defeat his rival Zhang Yan.

The Cao Man Zhuan (曹瞞傳) recorded that there was a saying at the time to describe Lü Bu and his Red Hare: "Among men, Lü Bu; Among steeds, Chì Tù (the Red Hare)".

== In Romance of the Three Kingdoms ==
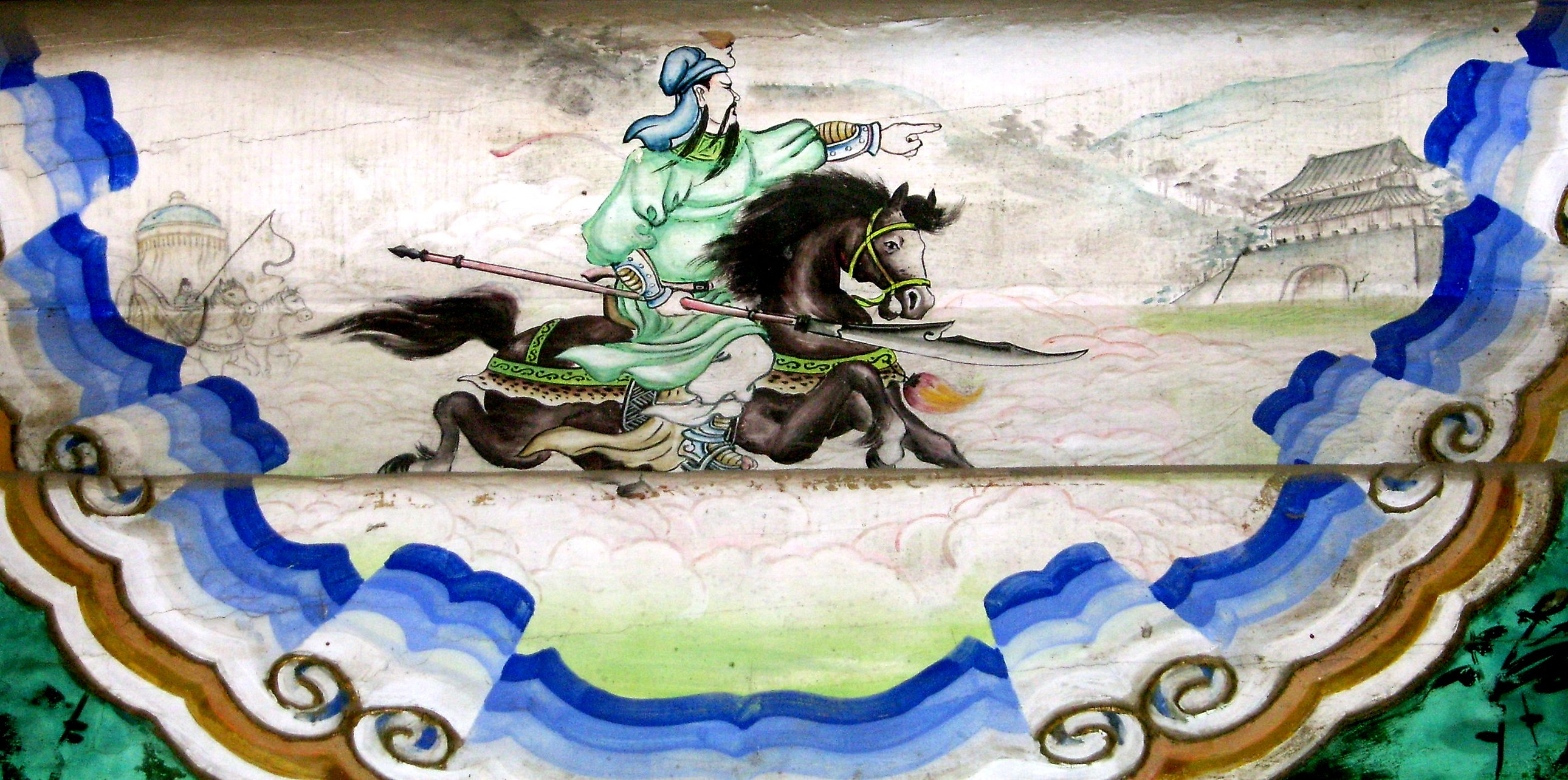
Guan Yu riding the Red Hare, as depicted in a mural in the Summer Palace, Beijing.

The Red Hare has a more prominent role in the 14th-century historical novel Romance of the Three Kingdoms, which romanticises the historical events before and during the Three Kingdoms period. It is originally a prized steed of the warlord Dong Zhuo. After hearing a suggestion from his adviser Li Su, Dong Zhuo sends Li Su to present the Red Hare as a gift to Lü Bu and induce Lü Bu to betray his foster father, Ding Yuan, and defect to his side. Lü Bu is very pleased to receive the Red Hare. After Li Su convinces him to do so, he murders Ding Yuan and defects to Dong Zhuo, whom he pledges allegiance to and acknowledges as his new foster father.

The Red Hare is described in the novel as follows:

"[...] named 'Red Hare', capable of travelling 1,000 li in a day. [...] crosses rivers and climbs mountains as though it is moving on flat land, [...] It is of uniform ashen red, with not a hair of another colour; it measures one zhang from head to tail and eight chi from hoof to head; it neighs as if it has the ambition of soaring into the sky or diving into the sea."

After Lü Bu's downfall and death at the Battle of Xiapi, the Red Hare comes into the possession of the warlord Cao Cao. Cao Cao gives it to Guan Yu later in an attempt to influence Guan Yu to join him. After Guan Yu's death, Ma Zhong (馬忠) takes the Red Hare and presents it to his lord Sun Quan, who immediately gives the horse as a gift to Ma Zhong. The Red Hare starves itself for days and dies.

== See also ==
- List of historical horses
