= Li (area) =

Chinese unit of measurement

Li (simplified Chinese: 厘; traditional Chinese: 釐; pinyin: lí) is a traditional unit of measurement for land area in China mainland. One li is 1/10th of a fen or 1/100 of a mu, equals 6+2/3 square meters or 7.973 square yards.

== Conversions ==
In 1929, the Nationalist government of China promulgated the Weights and Measures Act to adopt the metric system as the official standard and to limit the newer Chinese units of measurement to private sales and trade. These newer "market" units are based on rounded metric numbers, and has been effective on China mainland since 1 January 1930.

Table of Chinese area units effective since 1930
Pinyin	Character	Relative value	Metric value	Imperial value	Notes
háo	毫	1/1000	2/3 m^{2}	7.18 sq ft	
lí	釐 (T) or 厘 (S)	1/100	6 2/3 m^{2}	7.973 sq yd	
fēn	市分	1/10	66 2/3 m^{2}	79.73 sq yd	
mǔ	畝 (T) or 亩 (S)	1	666 2/3 m^{2}	797.3 sq yd 0.1647 acre	one mu (Chinese acre) =6000 square chi =60 square zhang =1/15 of a hectare
qǐng	頃 (T) or 顷 (S)	100	6 2/3 ha	16.47 acre	Chinese hide

For more details, please see article Mu (land).

== See also ==
- Chinese units of measurement
