= Changzhou University of Information Technology =

Educational institution in Changzhou, Jiangsu, China

Coordinates: 31°40′49″N 119°57′00″E

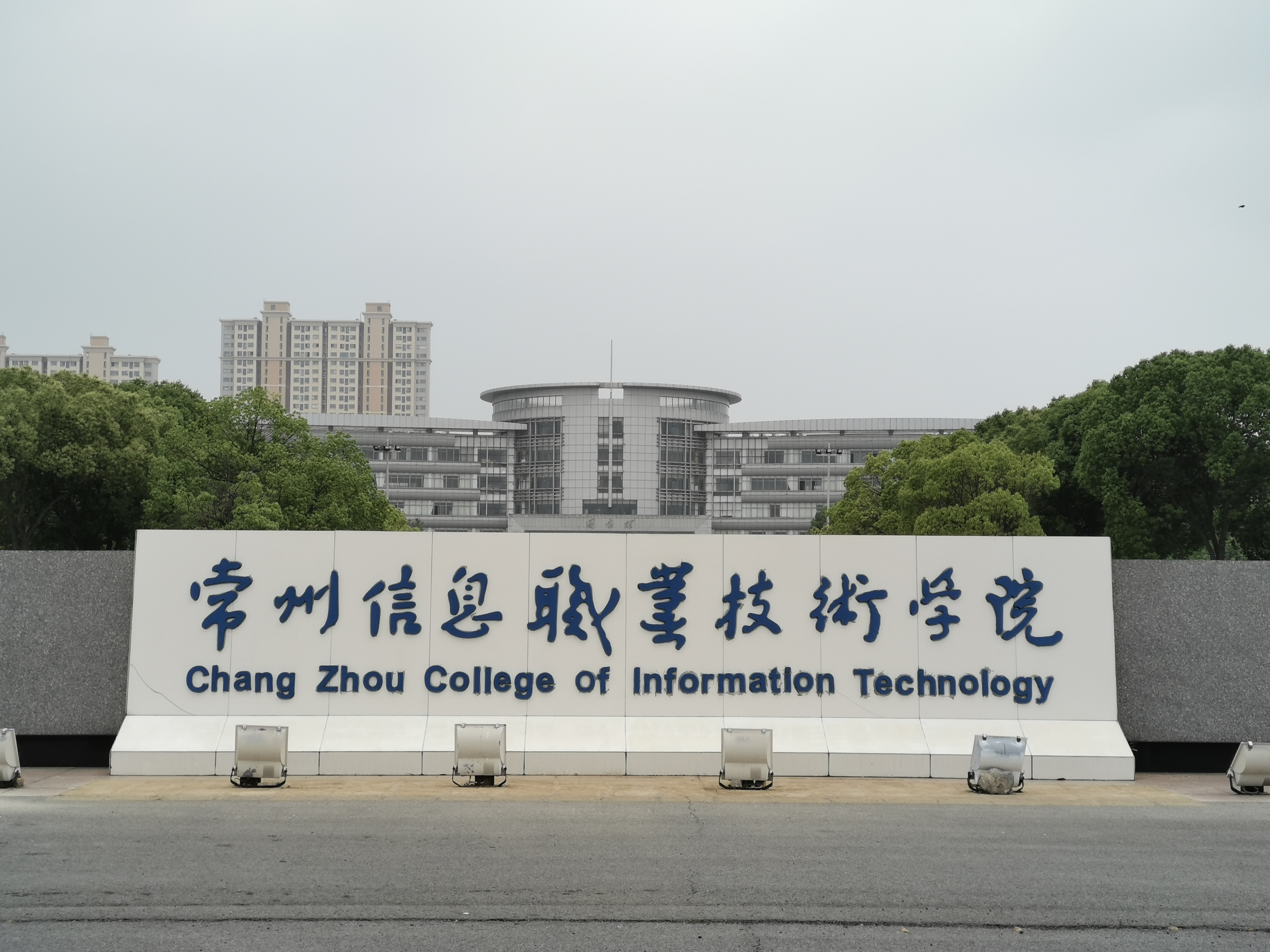
Main Gate

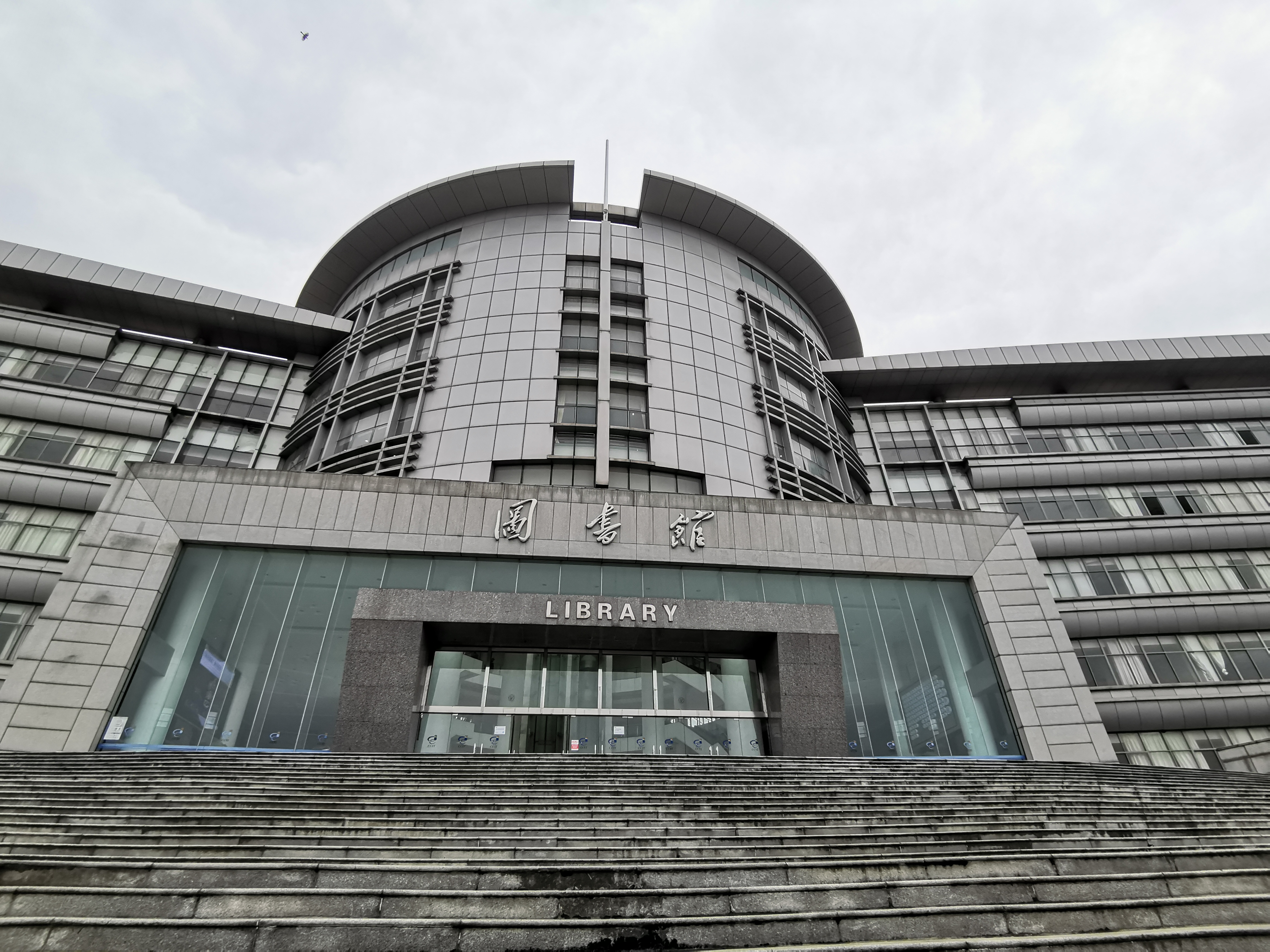
College Library

Changzhou University of Information Technology (CUIT, Chinese: 常州信息职业技术大学), formerly known as Changzhou College of Information Technology (CCIT, Chinese: 常州信息职业技术学院) is a public university in Changzhou in China's province of Jiangsu. The school was founded in October 2000 after the merger of Changzhou Radio Industrial School (Chinese: 常州无线电工业学校) and Changzhou Electronic Workers' University (Chinese: 常州市电子职工大学). It teaches students in information technology. The college occupies 1,036 mu. In 2006, there were 20 majors, 8,800 students, and 366 faculty and staff.
