= Fen (land) =

The fen (Chinese: 分; pinyin: fēn) in Mandarin, fan in Cantonese or hun in Taiwanese, is a traditional Chinese unit of measurement for land area. One fen equals 1/10th of a mu in China mainland, Hong Kong and Taiwan.

== Conversions ==
In China mainland,

- 1915 ~ 1929: 1 fen = 1/10 mu = 61.44 square meters = 73.48 square yards
- 1930 ~ present: 1 fen = 1/10 mu = 66+2/3 square meters = 79.73 square yards.

Table of Chinese area units effective since 1930
Pinyin	Character	Relative value	Metric value	Imperial value	Notes
háo	毫	1/1000	2/3 m^{2}	7.18 sq ft	
lí	釐 (T) or 厘 (S)	1/100	6 2/3 m^{2}	7.973 sq yd	
fēn	市分	1/10	66 2/3 m^{2}	79.73 sq yd	
mǔ	畝 (T) or 亩 (S)	1	666 2/3 m^{2}	797.3 sq yd 0.1647 acre	one mu (Chinese acre) =6000 square chi =60 square zhang =1/15 of a hectare
qǐng	頃 (T) or 顷 (S)	100	6 2/3 ha	16.47 acre	Chinese hide

In Hong Kong and Macau, 1 fen = 1/10 mu = 76.14 square meters = 91.06 square yards.

In Taiwan and Japan, 1 fen = 1/10 jia = 969.92 square meters = 10,440 square feet.

Taiwan used to be ruled by Holand and then by Japan. Its measurement system was influenced by these two countries. And 1 fen has been set to be 1/10 of a Jia instead of a mu.

For details, please see article Mu (land).

== Idioms ==
- One mu and three fen of land, or 1.3 mu of land (simplified Chinese: 一亩三分地; traditional Chinese: 一畝三分地; pinyin: yī mǔ sān fēn dì) is a Chinese idiom that figuratively refers to someone's small personal domain or limited territory, often implying a narrow scope of influence or control.

It is also the name of a Chinese website 1Point3Acres.

== See also ==
- Chinese units of measurement
- Taiwanese units of measurement
- Hong Kong units of measurement
