= Korean Industrial Standards =

Claim of compliance with Korean regulatory requirements

KS symbol

Korean Industrial Standards (KS; ㉿; Korean: 한국산업표준; Hanja: 韓國産業標準) are the standards used for industrial activities in South Korea, coordinated by the Korean Agency for Technology and Standards (KATS).

== Overview ==
Covering 21 sectors, including basic, mechanical, and electrical, they encompass approximately 23,000 items and span over 200,000 pages. Their content is utilized across all industries, including production, construction, testing, and research. They are published by the Director of the Agency for Technology and Standards after deliberation by the Industrial Standards Deliberation Committee in accordance with the Industrial Standardization Act.

== Composition ==
KS is national standards established by the Director of the Korean Agency for Technology and Standards after deliberation by the Industrial Standards Deliberation Committee pursuant to the Industrial Standardization Act. It consists of 21 sectors, from Basic (A) to Information (X).
