= Mu (land) =

Chinese unit of area

The mu (simplified Chinese: 亩; traditional Chinese: 畝; pinyin: mǔ) in Mandarin, mau or mou in Cantonese, or bo in Taiwanese Hokkien, also called Chinese acre, is a traditional Chinese unit of measurement for land area. One mu equals 666.67 square meters in mainland China, 761.4 square meters in Hong Kong and Macau, and 99.17 square meters in Taiwan and Japan. Mu is the only Chinese area unit legally retained by the People's Republic of China.

== Origin ==
The mu was defined in terms of the bu, or more precisely the square bu. Deng Zhan of the Three Kingdoms era wrote that "in the old times 100 bu makes a mu, but now 240 bu makes a mu. Han dynasty fields use Qin dynasty units." Combined with known values of the Han dynasty chi and bu, the "new" mu of the Han Dynasty is therefore 240 bu^{2} = 240 ((6 chi)/bu × (0.231 m)/chi)^{2}= 461 m^{2}.

== Mainland ==
On 7 January 1915, the Beiyang government promulgated a measurement law to use not only the metric system as the standard but also a set of Chinese measurement units based directly on the Qing dynasty definitions (營造尺庫平制).

Chinese area units promulgated in 1915
| Pinyin | Character | Relative value | Metric value | Imperial value | Notes |
|---|---|---|---|---|---|
| háo | 毫 | 1/1000 | 0.6144 m^{2} | 0.7348 sq yd | |
| lí | 釐 (T) or 厘 (S) (Note: T: Traditional Chinese, S: Simplified Chinese) | 1/100 | 6.144 m^{2} | 7.348 sq yd | |
| fēn | 分 | 1/10 | 61.44 m^{2} | 73.48 sq yd | |
| mǔ | 畝 (T) or 亩 (S) | 1 | 614.4 m^{2} | 734.82 sq yd | Chinese acre, or 60 square zhang |
| qǐng | 頃 (T) or 顷 (S) | 100 | 6.144 ha | 15.18 acre | Chinese hide |

where mu is the basic unit of area measurement.

On 16 February 1929, the Nationalist government promulgated The Weights and Measures Act to adopt the metric system as the official standard and to limit the newer Chinese units of measurement to private sales and trade in Article 11, effective on 1 January 1930. These newer "market" units are based on rounded metric numbers.

Chinese area units effective in 1930
| Pinyin | Character | Relative value | Metric value | Imperial value | Notes |
|---|---|---|---|---|---|
| háo | 毫 | 1/1000 | 2/3 m^{2} | 7.18 sq ft | |
| lí | 釐 (T) or 厘 (S) | 1/100 | 6 2/3 m^{2} | 7.973 sq yd | |
| fēn | 市分 | 1/10 | 66 2/3 m^{2} | 79.73 sq yd | |
| mǔ | 畝 (T) or 亩 (S) | 1 | 666 2/3 m^{2} | 797.3 sq yd 0.1647 acre | one mu (Chinese acre) =6000 square chi =60 square zhang =1/15 of a hectare |
| qǐng | 頃 (T) or 顷 (S) | 100 | 6 2/3 ha | 16.47 acre | Chinese hide |

And mu remains the base unit.

In mainland China, mu is the only area unit retained after the traditional Chinese measurement system was discontinued in the "Decree of the State Council Concerning the Use of Uniform Legal Measures in the Country" promulgated in 1959. Now the Chinese measurement system stipulates that 1 mu is equal to 60 square zhang, which is approximately equal to 666.67 square meters; 15 mu is equal to 1 hectare; 1 square kilometer is equal to 1500 mu.

== Macau ==
In Macau, mu is also the basic area unit of Chinese measurement. One mu is defined as 761.4 square meters. On 24 August 1992, Macau published Law No. 14/92/M that Chinese units of measurement similar to those used in Hong Kong, imperial units, and United States customary units would be permissible for five years since the effective date of the law, 1 January 1993, on the condition of indicating the corresponding International System of Units (SI) values, then for three more years thereafter, Chinese, imperial, and US units would be permissible as secondary to the SI.

Chinese area units in Macau
| Jyutping | Portuguese | Character | Relative value | Relation to the traditional Chinese units (Macau) | Metric value | Imperial value |
|---|---|---|---|---|---|---|
| cek3 | côvado | 尺 | 1/6000 | 1/25鋪 | 0.1269 m^{2} | 1.366 sq ft |
| pou3 | | 鋪 | 1/240 | 1/4丈 | 3.1725 m^{2} | 34.15 sq ft 3.794 sq yd |
| zoeng6 | braça | 丈 | 1/60 | 1/6分 | 12.69 m^{2} | 136.6 sq ft 15.18 sq yd |
| fan1 | condorim | 分 | 1/10 | 1/10畝 | 76.14 m^{2} | 91.06 sq yd |
| mau5 | maz | 畝 (T) or 亩 (S) | 1 | None | 761.4 m^{2} | 910.6 sq yd |

== Hong Kong ==
The Chinese units of measurement used in Hong Kong are similar to those used in Macau. In 1976 the Hong Kong Metrication Ordinance allowed a gradual replacement of the system in favor of the SI metric system. The Weights and Measures Ordinance does not recognize Chinese units for area.

The standard commercial measure of real estate area is in square feet of the imperial system. Apartment or office size is generally still given in square feet. However, square metres are used for official purposes.

The traditional units of agricultural land area are the mau or mou (Cantonese for mu) and the local dau chung (斗種). Notionally the two units are defined differently, with the dau chung being the amount of land which could be planted by one dau (斗) of rice; in practice the area of one dau chung is roughly equal to one mau.

== Taiwan ==
In Taiwan, the principal unit for measuring the floor space of an office or apartment is 坪 (Taiwanese Hokkien: pêⁿ, Hakka: phiàng, Mandarin: píng). The unit derives from the Japanese tsubo, the base unit of the Japanese area. The principal unit of land measure is 甲 (Taiwanese Hokkien: kah, Hakka: kap, Mandarin: jiǎ). The unit is derived from the obsolete Dutch morgen, which was introduced during Taiwan's Dutch era.

Taiwanese mu is derived from Japanese se, i.e., equals one Japanese se or 30 ping.

Area units used in Taiwan
| Unit | | | | Pêⁿ | Kah | Metric | | US and imperial | | Notes |
| Taiwanese Hokkien | Hakka | Mandarin | Character | Pêⁿ | Kah | Exact | Approx. | Exact | Approx. | Notes |
|---|---|---|---|---|---|---|---|---|---|---|
| Pêⁿ | Phiàng | Píng | 坪 | 1 | | 400/121 m^{2} | 3.306 m^{2} | 625,000,000/158,080,329 sq yd | 35.58 sq ft | Same as Japanese Tsubo |
| Bó͘ | Méu | Mǔ | 畝 | 30 | | 12,000/121 m^{2} | 99.17 m^{2} | 6,250,000,000/52,693,443 sq yd | 1,067 sq ft | Same as Japanese Se |
| Hun | Fûn | Fēn | 分 | 293.4 | 1/10 | 117360/121 m^{2} | 969.92 m^{2} | — | 10,440 sq ft | |
| Kah | Kap | Jiǎ | 甲 | 2,934 | 1 | 1173600/121 m^{2} | 0.9699 ha | — | 2.3967 acres | Derived from Dutch Morgen |
| Lê | Lài | Lí | 犁 | 14,670 | 5 | 5868000/121 m^{2} | 4.8496 ha | — | 11.984 acres | Used from Kingdom of Tungning |

Officially, land area is measured in square metres.

== "Mu", "acre" and "are" ==
There are three area units whose Chinese names include character 畝: 市畝, 英畝 and 公畝. Their meanings and conversions are as follows:

- 市畝 (Chinese mu; character-by-character translation: "market mu"): Or simply called mu, is a traditional Chinese unit of measure, roughly equals 667 square meters in mainland China.
- 英畝 (acre, "British mu"): A British imperial unit, about 4,047 square meters or 0.405 hectares.
- 公畝 (are, "common mu"): Part of the metric system, equivalent to 100 square meters.

1 Chinese mu =6.667 ares = 0.164 acre.

== Idioms ==
One mu and three fen of land, or 1.3 mu of land (simplified Chinese: 一亩三分地; traditional Chinese: 一畝三分地; pinyin: yī mǔ sān fēn dì) is a Chinese idiom that figuratively refers to someone's small personal domain or limited territory, often implying a narrow scope of influence or control. It is also the name of a Chinese website 1Point3Acres.

== See also ==
- Chinese units of measurement
- Taiwanese units of measurement
- Hong Kong units of measurement
- zh:亩 (the Chinese Wiki article of Mu)
