= State Administration of Quality Management (North Korea) =

The National Quality Management Commission, formerly the State Administration of Quality Management of the Democratic People's Republic of Korea (SAQM) is the North Korean standards organization. It oversees standards and metrology, including application of both the metric system and traditional Korean units, in accordance with the 1993 Law on Metrology. It is located at 1 Inhung-Dong in Moranbong District, Pyongyang.

The commission operates under the Academy of Sciences of the Democratic People's Republic of Korea. Both are cabinet-level institutions. As of January 2020, the commission is led by Ri Chol-jin.

== Purview ==
The commission is charged with elaborating and realizing state metrological regulation and policy; defining, registering, and maintaining measurement standards and devices; accrediting the North Korean institution of self-calibration; organizing and conducting inspections and supervision to ensure proper use of approved measurements; approving guidelines for measurement calibration within North Korea.

== Subsidiary organizations ==
=== Committee for Standardization of the Democratic People's Republic of Korea ===
The Committee for Standardization of the Democratic People's Republic of Korea (CSK) represents the country in international standardization organizations, such as International Organization for Standardization (ISO).

=== Central Institute of Metrology ===
The National Quality Management Commission has supervision over the Central Institute of Metrology (CIM), located at Songsin Dong 1 in Sadong District, Pyongyang. The CIM maintains custody over North Korea's national standards. It also calibrates high-precision reference standards for provincial verification offices and other agencies; performs research on metrology and its application within North Korea; and assists the SAQM with supervision over implementation of North Korean laws related to metrology.

=== IEC National Committee of Democratic People's Republic of Korea ===
The IEC National Committee of Democratic People's Republic of Korea under the National Quality Management Commission is a member of the International Electrotechnical Commission.

=== Territorial Institutions of Calibration ===
The National Quality Management Commission has supervision over Territorial Institutions of Calibration which have similar responsibilities at a provincial level.

== See also ==
- Academy of Sciences of the Democratic People's Republic of Korea
- Korean units
- Metric system
