= Korean Standards Association =

KSA
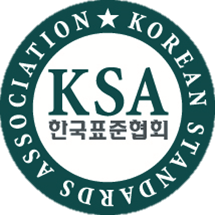
- Formation: March 13, 1962; 64 years ago
- Type: Professional association
- Purpose: To carry out industrial standardization, to disseminate and accelerate quality management. To promote science and technology, and to improve productivity. There by contributing to the national economy of Korea
- Headquarters: Gangnam, Seoul
- Region served: Worldwide
- Services: Standardization, Certification, Quality Promotions, Training, Membership
- Members: 4800 (approximately) (2013)
- Subsidiaries: KSA Media
- Website: ksa.or.kr

The KSA, formerly known as Korean Standards Association (Korean: 한국표준협회; RR: Hangook Pyojoon Hyeobhui,) is a public organization that is under the Ministry of Trade, Industry and Energy (MOTIE).⁣ of the Republic of Korea.

The KSA was established in 1962 pursuant to Article 32 of the Industrial Standardization Act.

The Chairman and CEO is Lee Sang-jin. At the end of the fiscal year 2017, sales profit amounted to ~₩99.6 billion (US$74.31 million).

== See also ==
- Government
- Economy of South Korea
- Ministry of Trade, Industry and Energy
- KATS and KASTO, other Korean standards associations
