= Qiu Guangming =

Qiu Guangming (丘光明, b. 1936) is a researcher best known for her works on the history of Chinese metrology.

Qiu was born in Nanjing in 1936. In 1937, her parents fled the Japanese attack on the city, and resettled in Chongqing. Desiring to be an artist, the young Qiu studied painting, and then taught it for a while. In 1963, she was assigned to work in a factory in Beijing in a job unrelated to her youthful aspirations—the production of measuring equipment for the Chinese National Institute of Metrology (NIM). During the Cultural Revolution, many researchers at the NIM had been fired, and in 1976 Qiu was asked to become part of their staff. Although not formally awarded the title of researcher until the 1990s, Qiu worked in a small group established on her arrival and tasked to survey historical Chinese metrology. Although she officially retired in 1999, Qiu became attached to her historical investigations, and continued to work at the Institute thereafter. According to Robert P. Crease, as the focus of the Institute shifted, no new personnel were hired to continue historical research, making Qiu the last surviving member of this group at NIM.

Up until the 1980s, the reference work in Chinese metrology was a book by Wu Chenglou (吳承洛), Zhongguo dulianghengshi (中國度量衡史), first printed in 1937 and republished/revised a few times since (1957, 1993). It relies however mostly on literary accounts. The subsequently published research, among which Qiu books are prominent, has put more emphasis on archeological discoveries. Her 1992 book Zhongguo lidai duliangheng kao catalogs 1,481 extant metrological instruments spanning Chinese history from the Shang dynasty to modern times. A 2004 bibliographical survey notes that the book "contains many photographs of archeological remains, rubbings of inscriptions and illustrations drawn by Qiu Guangming herself. Archeological remains are described, and each major section is accompanied by a research article, containing tables summarizing the quantitative findings."

== Selected publications ==
- Zhongguo lidai duliangheng kao (中國歷代度量衡考 — Investigations into the length, capacity and weight measures of China through the ages), Beijing: Kexue chubanshe (科学出版社 — Science Press), 1992, 520 p., ISBN 7-03-003283-7
- Jiliangshi (计量史 — A history of metrology), Changsha: Hunan Jiaoyu chubanshe (湖南教育出版社), 2002, 669 p., ISBN 7-5355-3850-9; part of Zhongguo wulixueshi daxi 中國物理學史大系 — The great series of Chinese history of physics
- with translation by Yanming Zhang (张延明), Zhongguo gudai jiliang shi tujian (中国古代计量史图鉴 — A concise history of ancient Chinese measures and weights), Hefei: Hefei gongyedaxue chubanshe (合肥工业大学出版社 — Hefei University Press), 2005, 190p., ISBN 7-81093-284-5; bilingual edition: Chinese-English
