= Kan (unit) =

Korean unit of length; approximately two metres

The kan (Korean: 간; Hanja: 間) is a traditional unit of measurement used in Korean architecture still found in use today primarily to describe palaces, Buddhist temples and shrines, and Confucian school buildings, from the Joseon era. A kan is the distance between two support beams or pillars. 1 kan is defined as being a space of about two meters, or 6–8 feet. Kan is also used to define an area in a traditional building, referring to the square space enclosed by 4 wooden pillars.

== See also ==
- Korean units
- Ken, its Japanese equivalent
