= 1Point3Acres =

Chinese language forum for Chinese people in North America

1Point3Acres 一亩三分地
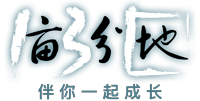
- The first line of the 1Point3Acres logo says "1亩3分地", which has the literal meaning of "1.3 mu of land". The second line of the logo says "伴你一起成长", which means "grow up with you".
- Website type: Forum
- Available in: Chinese
- Founded: 2009
- Headquarters: United States
- Website: www.1point3acres.com
- Commercial: Yes
- Registration: Optional

1Point3Acres
- Traditional Chinese: 一畝三分地
- Simplified Chinese: 一亩三分地
- Literal meaning: 1.3 mu of land
Transcriptions
Standard Mandarin
- Hanyu Pinyin: yīmǔsān fēn dì
Yue: Cantonese
- Jyutping: Jat^{1} Mau^{5} Saam^{1} Fan^{1} Dei^{6}

1Point3Acres (simplified Chinese: 一亩三分地; traditional Chinese: 一畝三分地; lit. '1.3 mu of land', metaphorically referring to one's own space) is a Chinese-language website. It is a forum for Chinese people in North America who are students and workers to discuss schools, employers, and the visa policy of the United States.

It was co-founded in 2009 by a man who goes by the username Warald and Guo Yu (Chinese: 郭昱). 1Point3Acres in January 2020 created CovidNet to track real-time data about COVID-19 on a county level including information about infections, recoveries, and deaths. By June 2020, CovidNet was used by over 500 groups and by June 2021, it had received over 500 billion views. The Centers for Disease Control and Prevention, Esri, Johns Hopkins University, and the University of Chicago used it to track the outbreak.

== History ==
1Point3Acres was co-founded in 2009 by a man who goes by the username Warald and Guo Yu (Chinese: 郭昱). A 2020 article said Guo, who is from Wuhan, was working as a senior engineering manager of machine learning at Uber. 1Point3Acres is operated by Chinese-born immigrants to the United States. It is a North American website that provides Chinese people information about jobs, immigration, and study abroad. For a fee, the website gives users access to companies' interview questions and descriptions of people's interview experiences. According to xAI co-founder Greg Yang, a job candidate in 2024 had told him previous applicants had shared on 1Point3Acres the interview questions they had received. The website hosts a page that tracks changes to the visa policy of the United States.

The forum is widely used by Chinese people who have moved to North America to study or work. Users in 2020 discussed having the "sword of Damocles" hanging over their heads in response to proposed changes from the United States Department of Homeland Security that would shorten how much time international students could remain in the country. A significant number of the forum's posters in 2023 considered moving back to China and discussed how the American and Chinese work environments were different. For multiple weeks in 2023, the hashtag "#USLayoffs" was popular and numerous commenters discussed visa problems. Forum participants made the hashtags "#IsItTooLateToLearnCoding" and "#HowArtandBizMajorsBecomeProgrammers" trend as many people who had studied majors outside of computer science like education, literature, and finance hoped to find a programming role. On October 12, 2022, a female Chinese student who had graduated from Olin Business School in 2012 made a pseudonymous allegation of sexual harassment on a 1Point3Acres WeChat post against Philip H. Dybvig after he received the 2022 Nobel Memorial Prize in Economic Sciences.

== CovidNet ==
Headed by the website's co-founder Guo, a volunteer contingent in January 2020 began collecting real-time data for CovidNet, 1Point3Acres' COVID-19 tracker. Initially covering real-time North American data only, it later tracked additional countries. The CovidNet dashboard tracks data at the county level, is interactive, and contains information about how many people got COVID-19 and how many people recovered from it or died from it. While 1Point3Acres full-time employees built the engineering to power CovidNet, volunteers including engineers, professors, and data scientists collected data. In June 2020, 522 groups were using CovidNet, which had garnered over 225 million views. By June 2021, it received more than 2.8 billion views. Lauren Gardner, who created a Johns Hopkins University dashboard to track COVID-19 data, used 1Point3Acres, which assembles COVID-19 data from multiple media publications. The University of Chicago's Center for Spatial Data Science used 1Point3Acres's data to put together an "interactive visualization" of COVID-19 outbreaks, while Esri used data from 1Point3Acre for its dashboard. The Centers for Disease Control and Prevention (CDC) used the 1Point3Acres tracker as one of its data sources.

The Chinese edition of Scientific American in June 2020 called CovidNet "the world's most real-time, extensive, and geographically differentiated COVID-19 tracking platform". An article in Cartography and Geographic Information Science said CovidNet "may possess unique advantages in early reporting of data, but for the most part it has lower disagreement coefficients with other datasets to date". Researchers in the journal IEEE Access discussed a shortcoming of CovidNet, writing, "Another issue is for a display dashboard, the raw data is difficult to access by the public (even it claims the data could be distributed with permission). Hence, it is impossible for users to define the granularity of data, filter the content of data and select the categories of data for customized scholar research."
