= Korea Association of Standards and Testing Organizations =

South Korean standards organization

The Korea Association of Standards and Testing Organizations (KASTO; Korean: 한국계량측정협회) is an association of the standards and testing organizations of South Korea. It was formed in 1990.

== History ==
The KASTO was established in 1990 to ensure efficient operation of the national calibration service.

== Courses ==
The KASTO provides courses training metrological technicians and officials.

== See also ==
- KATS
- KRISS
- KSA
