= Vitaly Fen =

Uzbekistani diplomat (1947–2024)

Vitaly Vasilievich Fen (Russian: Виталий Васильевич Фен; 18 October 1947 – 18 June 2024) was an Uzbekistani diplomat who was stationed in South Korea from 1995 to 2013.

== Career ==
Fen began to play a role in relations between South Korea and Uzbekistan as early as 1992, soon after the dissolution of the Soviet Union, when he set up the first of twelve meetings he would ultimately organise between the president of South Korea and the president of Uzbekistan. He first came to South Korea in 1995 to take up a new position as chargé d'affaires of the Uzbekistani embassy in Seoul, and was promoted to ambassador in 1999. By 2007, with the departure of El Salvadorean ambassador Alfredo Ungo, Fen became the dean of the diplomatic corps in South Korea. He departed from South Korea in August 2013, leaving the position of dean of the diplomatic corps to Harun Ismail of Brunei.

== Personal life ==
Fen was of Korean descent; his grandparents were Korean immigrants to the Soviet Union, and settled in Vladivostok before being deported in 1937 to the Uzbek Soviet Socialist Republic, where Fen himself was born in the capital Tashkent. He was married to Lyudmila, who is also of Korean descent. He began studying the Korean language in 1988, and made his first trip to South Korea in 1989 to attend the World Ethnic Korean Festival. Fen died on 18 June 2024, at the age of 76.
