= Shaku (unit of length) =

Traditional Japanese unit of length

- Unit system: Japanese units
- Unit of: length
- Symbol: 尺

Conversions
1 尺 in ...	... is equal to ...
- SI units: 0.3030 m
- Imperial/US units: 0.9942 ft; 11.93 in

The shaku (Japanese: 尺) or Japanese foot is a Japanese unit of length derived (but varying) from the Chinese chi, originally based upon the distance measured by a human hand from the tip of the thumb to the tip of the forefinger (Note: East Asian custom usually considers a span from thumb to index finger rather than from thumb to little finger.) (compare span). Traditionally, the length varied by location or use, but it is now standardized as 10/33 m, or approximately 30.3 centimetres (11.9 in).

== Etymology in English ==
Shaku entered English in the early 18th century, a romanization of the Japanese Go-on reading of the character for Japanese foot (尺, shaku).

== Use in Japan ==
The shaku has been standardized since 1891 as 10/33 m, about 30.3 cm (11.93 in). This means that there are 3.3 shaku (33/10) to one metre.

This definition was established by Meiji government law; until then, even though the unit was given the same name, its length varied depending on the era. At the same time, other units were established based on shaku.

明治二十四年（1891年）三月二十四日法律第三號 度量衡法
第四條 從來慣用ノ鯨尺ハ布帛ヲ度ルトキニ限リ之ヲ用ヰルコトヲ得
鯨尺一尺ハ一尺二寸五分トシ其ノ十倍ヲ鯨尺一丈、十分ノ一ヲ鯨尺一寸、百分ノ一ヲ鯨尺一分トス

English：1 shaku = 10 sun = 100 bu
Japanese：1尺 = 10寸 = 100分

The use of the unit for official purposes in Japan was banned on March 31, 1966, although it is still used in traditional Japanese carpentry and some other fields, such as kimono construction. The traditional Japanese bamboo flute known as the shakuhachi ("shaku" and "eight") derives its name from its length of one shaku and eight sun. Similarly, the koku remains in use in the Japanese lumber trade. In the Japanese construction industry, the standard sizes of drywall, plywood, and other sheet goods are based on shaku, with the most common width being three shaku (rounded up to 910 mm (35.83 in)).

In Japanese media parlance, shaku refers to screen time: the amount of time someone or something is shown on screen (similar to the English "footage").

== History ==
Traditionally, the actual length of the shaku varied over time, location, and use. By the early 19th century, the shaku was largely within the range of 0.30175 to 0.303 metres (11.880 in to 11.929 in), but a longer value of the shaku (also known as the kōrai-shaku) was also known, and was 1.17 times longer than the present value (35.5 centimetres or 14.0 inches).

=== Tailor's unit ===
Another shaku variant was used for measuring cloth, which measured 125/330 metres (37.9 centimetres or 14.9 inches), and was known as the "whale shaku" (鯨尺, kujirajaku), as baleen (whale whiskers) were used as cloth rulers.

To distinguish the two variants of shaku, the general unit was known as the "metal shaku" (金尺/曲尺, kanejaku). The Shōsōin treasure house in Nara preserves some antique ivory one-shaku rulers, known as the kōgebachiru-no-shaku (紅牙撥鏤尺).

== Derived units ==
=== Length ===
Just as with the Chinese unit, the shaku is divided into ten smaller units, known as sun (寸) in Japanese, and ten shaku together form a larger unit known in Japanese as a jō (丈). The Japanese also had a third derived unit, the ken, equal to six shaku; this was used extensively in traditional Japanese architecture as the distance between supporting pillars in Buddhist temples and Shinto shrines.

=== Volume ===
Ten cubic shaku comprised a koku, reckoned as the amount of rice necessary to sustain a peasant for a year.

== Outside Japan ==
The Japanese shaku also forms the basis of the modern Taiwanese foot.

In 1909, the Korean Empire adopted the Japanese definition of the shaku as that of the ja (자).

== See also ==
- Japanese units of measurement

== Bibliography ==
- Weiner, E. S. C.; Simpson, J. A. (2004) [1989]. The Oxford English Dictionary. Oxford University Press. ISBN 0-19-861227-3.
