= Festival of New Songs =

Festival of New Songs (Slovene: Festival novih skladb, FENS; previously Festival Nova scena) is a festival of new and as yet nonaffirmed musicians from Slovenia and abroad. Adults as well as children and teenagers compete. It takes place in Izola and Koper. In its more than 20 years of history more than 500 rock, jazz, metal, and pop performers from Slovenia and abroad (Italy, Croatia, and France) have participated, amongst them Kingston, Tinkara Kovač, Lara Baruca, Ylenia Zobec, Siddharta, Alya, Polona Furlan, Andraž Hribar, Monika Pučelj, Sound Attack, Aleksandra Čermelj, Mambo Kings, Nude, Botri, Maja Slatinšek, Johnny Bravo, Foxy teens, and Eva Černe.

== See also ==
- Melodije morja in sonca
