= Korean Agency for Technology and Standards =

Government organization in South Korea

Coordinates: 36°54′53″N 127°33′04″E

Korean Agency for Technology and Standards (KATS; Korean: 국가기술표준원; Hanja: 國家技術標準院) is the government standards organization for South Korea. It is part of the Ministry of Knowledge Economy.

It is authorized to regulate and manage the legal measures of South Korea by the current Measures Act.

KATS is a member of the International Organization for Standardization (ISO), as well as the International Electrotechnical Commission (IEC).

== See also ==
- Korea Association of Standards & Testing Organizations
