= Chinese units of measurement =

Traditional system of measurement used by Han Chinese

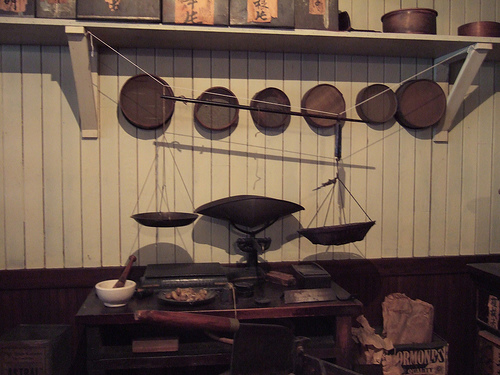
- A traditional Chinese scale
- Chinese: 市制
- Literal meaning: market system
Transcriptions
Standard Mandarin
- Hanyu Pinyin: shìzhì
- Wade–Giles: shih-chih

Alternative Chinese name
- Chinese: 市用制
- Literal meaning: market-use system
Transcriptions
Standard Mandarin
- Hanyu Pinyin: shìyòngzhì
- Wade–Giles: shih-yung-chih

Chinese units of measurement, known in Chinese as the shìzhì ("market system"), are the traditional units of measurement of the Han Chinese. Although Chinese numerals have been decimal (base-10) since the Shang, several Chinese measures use hexadecimal (base-16). Local applications have varied, but the Chinese dynasties usually proclaimed standard measurements and recorded their predecessor's systems in their histories.

In the present day, the People's Republic of China maintains some customary units based upon the market units but standardized to round values in the metric system, for example the common jin or catty of exactly 500 g. The Chinese name for most metric units is based on that of the closest traditional unit; when confusion might arise, the word "market" (市, shì) is used to specify the traditional unit and "common" or "public" (公, gōng) is used for the metric value. Taiwan, like Korea, saw its traditional units standardized to Japanese values and their conversion to a metric basis, such as the Taiwanese ping of about 3.306 m^{2} based on the square ken. The Hong Kong SAR continues to use its traditional units, now legally defined based on a local equation with metric units. For instance, the Hong Kong catty is precisely 604.78982 g.

The names lí (釐 or 厘) and fēn (分) are used for small units of length, area, and mass; however, they refer to different magnitudes.

== History ==
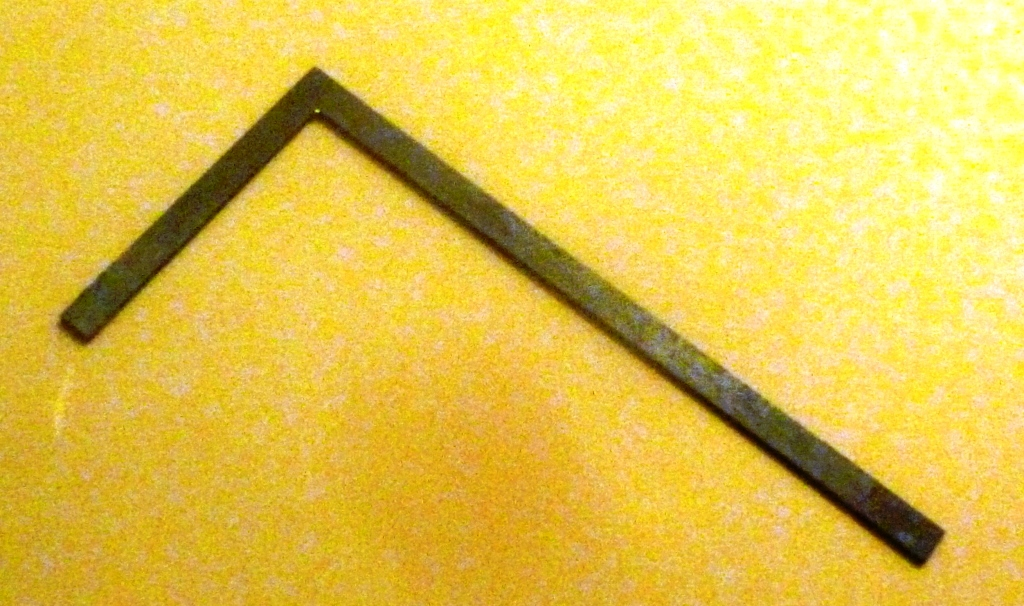
Bronze ruler from the Han dynasty (206 BCE to CE 220); excavated in Zichang County; Shaanxi History Museum, Xi'an

According to the Liji, the legendary Yellow Emperor created the first measurement units. The Xiao Erya and the Kongzi Jiayu state that length units were derived from the human body. According to the Records of the Grand Historian, these human body units caused inconsistency, and Yu the Great, another legendary figure, unified the length measurements. Rulers with decimal units have been unearthed from Shang dynasty tombs.

In the Zhou dynasty, the king conferred nobles with powers of the state and the measurement units began to be inconsistent from state to state. After the Warring States period, Qin Shi Huang unified China, and later standardized measurement units. In the Han dynasty, these measurements were still being used, and were documented systematically in the Book of Han.

=== Republican Era ===
On 7 January 1915, the Beiyang government promulgated a measurement law to use not only metric system as the standard but also a set of Chinese-style measurement based directly on the Qing dynasty definitions (营造尺库平制).

On 16 February 1929, the Nationalist government adopted and promulgated The Weights and Measures Act to adopt the metric system as the official standard and to limit the newer Chinese units of measurement (Chinese: 市用制; pinyin: shìyòngzhì; lit. 'market-use system') to private sales and trade in Article 11, effective on 1 January 1930. These newer "market" units are based on rounded metric numbers.

These units are still retained for use in the Republic of China-controlled territories of Kinmen and Matsu nowadays.

=== People's Republic of China ===
The Government of the People's Republic of China continued using the market system along with metric system, as decreed by the State Council of the People's Republic of China on 25 June 1959, but 1 catty being 500 grams, would become divided into 10 (new) taels, instead of 16 (old) taels, to be converted from province to province, while exempting Chinese prescription drugs from the conversion to prevent errors.

On 27 February 1984, the State Council of the People's Republic of China decreed the market system to remain acceptable until the end of 1990 and ordered the transition to the national legal measures by that time, but farmland measures would be exempt from this mandatory metrication until further investigation and study.

=== Hong Kong ===
In 1976 the Hong Kong Metrication Ordinance allowed a gradual replacement of the system in favor of the International System of Units (SI) metric system. The Weights and Measures Ordinance defines the metric, Imperial, and Chinese units. As of 2012, all three systems are legal for trade and are in widespread use.

=== Macau ===
On 24 August 1992, Macau published Law No. 14/92/M to order that Chinese units of measurement similar to those used in Hong Kong, Imperial units, and United States customary units would be permissible for five years since the effective date of the Law, 1 January 1993, on the condition of indicating the corresponding SI values, then for three more years thereafter, Chinese, Imperial, and US units would be permissible as secondary to the SI.

== Ancient Chinese units ==
=== Length ===
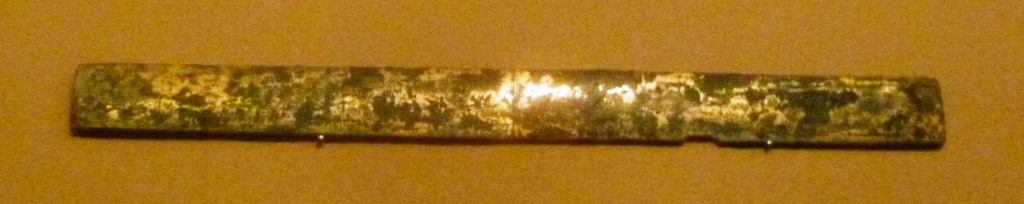
Gilded Bronze Ruler - 1 chi = 231 mm. Western Han (206 BCE–8 CE). Hanzhong City

Traditional units of length include the chi (尺), bu (步), and li (里). The precise length of these units, and the ratios between these units, has varied over time. 1 bu has consisted of either 5 or 6 chi, while 1 li has consisted of 300 or 360 bu.

Length in metres
Dynasty	chi	bu		li	
Dynasty	chi	= 5 chi	= 6 chi	= 300 bu	= 360 bu
Shang (c. 1600 – c. 1045 BC)	0.1675	0.8375	1.0050	301.50	361.80
Shang (c. 1600 – c. 1045 BC)	0.1690	0.8450	1.0140	304.20	365.04
Western Zhou (c. 1045–771 BC)	0.1990	0.9950	1.1940	358.20	429.84
Eastern Zhou (c. 771–256 BC)	0.2200	1.1000	1.3200	396.00	475.200
Eastern Zhou (c. 771–256 BC)	0.2270	1.1350	1.3620	408.60	490.32
Eastern Zhou (c. 771–256 BC)	0.2310	1.1550	1.3860	415.80	498.96
Qin (c. 221–206 BC)	0.2260	1.1300	1.3560	406.80 415.80	488.16
Han (c. 202 BC–9 AD; 25–220 AD)	0.2300	1.1500	1.3800	414.00	496.80
Han (c. 202 BC–9 AD; 25–220 AD)	0.2381	1.1805	1.4286	415.80 415.80 428.58	514.30
Wei – Sui (c. 220–266 AD; 581 to 618 AD)	0.2550	1.2750	1.5300	459.00	550.80
Tang (c. 618–690 AD; 705–907 AD)	0.2465	1.2325	1.4790	369.75	443.70
Tang (c. 618–690 AD; 705–907 AD)	0.2955	1.4775	1.7730	443.25	531.90
Song (c. 960–1279 AD)	0.2700	1.3500	1.6200	405.00	486.00
Northern Song (c. 960–1127 AD)	0.3080	1.5400	1.8480	462.00	554.40
Ming (c. 1368–1644 AD)	0.3008–0.3190	1.5040–1.5950	1.8048–1.9140	451.20–478.50	541.44–574.20
Qing (c. 1636–1912 AD)	0.3080–0.3352	1.5400–1.6760	1.8048–2.0112	462.00–503.89	554.40–603.46

=== Mass ===
Ancient Chinese weight units are mostly defined around the jin or catty. Blanks in the table means that the derived unit is not used in the era.

Mass in grams
Dynasty		shi/dan (石) (Note: The unit 石/䄷 was pronounced the same as the same as the noun 石 "stone" in Eastern Han Dynasty, corresponding to modern Mandarin shí. An alternate pronunciation for the unit, corresponding to today's dàn, evolved later from the word for a carrying pole, 擔/担.)	jun (鈞)	jin (斤)	liang (兩)	zhu (銖)	qian (錢)	fen (分)
Dynasty		120 jin	30 jin	1 jin	1/16 jin	1/384 jin	1/160 jin	1/1600 jin
Pre-Qin		30000	7500	250	15.625	0.651 (Note: 1 zhu was in turn divided into 100 shu (黍). Shu meaning proso millet, i.e. the mass of a millet grain. Similar to grain (unit).)	1.5625	0.15625
Qin		30360	7590	253	15.8125	0.658854166667	1.58125	0.158125
Western Han		29760	7440	248	15.5	0.645833333333	1.55	0.155
Eastern Han, Three Kingdoms, Jin		26400	6600	220	13.8	0.575	1.375	0.1375
N. & S.	S. Qi	39600	9900	330	20.625	0.859375	2.0625	0.20625
N. & S.	Liang, Chen	26400	6600	220	13.75	0.575	1.375	0.1375
N. & S.	N. Wei & N. Qi	52800	13200	440	27.5	1.1458333333333	2.75	0.275
N. & S.	N. Zhou	79200	19800	660	41.25	1.71875	4.125	0.4125
Sui	Small system	26400	6600	220	13.75	0.575	1.375	0.1375
Sui	Large system	79320	19830	661	41.3125	1.721354166667	4.13125	0.413125
Tang		79320	19830	661	41.3125	1.721354166667	4.13125	0.413125
Song, Yuan		75960	18990	633	39.5625	1.6484375	3.95625	0.395625
Ming, Qing		70800	17700	590	36.875	1.536458333333	3.6875	0.36875

=== Time ===
For daytime and nighttime units, the following assume a standardized sundown of yǒu shí central 1 kè (19:12 in 24-hour notation).

Table of time units
Unit name		Unit value		Notes
Unit name	Character	Relative	Metric/modern	Notes
miǎo	秒	1/100 fēn	144 milliseconds	Defined in 1280
fēn	分	1/6000 day	14.4 second	
kè	刻	(minor) 1/6 major kè	144 seconds	The major kè was defined at 1/100 (rarely 1/96, 1/108, or 1/120) day during most of Chinese history. It became established at 1/96 day after the Qing dynasty, becoming the same as the modern kè.
kè	刻	(major) 1/100 day	14 minutes 24 seconds	The major kè was defined at 1/100 (rarely 1/96, 1/108, or 1/120) day during most of Chinese history. It became established at 1/96 day after the Qing dynasty, becoming the same as the modern kè.
shí/shíchén	時/時辰 (T) 时/时辰 (S)	1/12 day	2 hours	Daytime unit
diǎn	點 (T) 点 (S)	1/6 gēng	24 minutes	Nighttime unit
gēng	更	1/10 day	2.4 hours	Nighttime units
rì / tiān	日/天	(basic unit)	1 day	

=== Volume ===
According to Book of Han, the fundamental unit of volume was the yuè (龠), the volume of 1200 grains of proso millet. 100 yuè makes a gě (合), and 10 gě makes a shēng (升, about 0.2 L). For dry measure, the dǒu (斗, "ladle"), hú (斛), and shi or dàn (石, "[basket for] a stone['s weight]") were used for larger amounts.

The amounts of grains were also used as a measure of monthly and annual salary, particularly for official posts in the imperial bureaucracy.

The volume units have evolved through the Dynasties. By the Qing Dynasty, the shēng had become very close to the metric liter.

== Modern Chinese units ==
Chinese measurement law in 1915

All "metric values" given in the tables are exact unless otherwise specified by the approximation sign '~'. Certain units are also listed at List of Chinese classifiers → Measurement units.

The units in the following tables can be grouped into a few types:

- Traditional-derived units for length, area, volume, and mass.
  - In mainland China, these units were defined in three batches. The Republic of China government promulgated in 1915 a metric version of the Qing Dynasty Yingzao Chi Kuping Zhi (Chinese: 营造尺库平制; lit. 'Camp-builder's chi and Treasury's weights unit system'). The ROC government then promulgated the "market unit" (Chinese: 市制) system in 1930, redefining traditional units as simple fractions of metric units. Finally, the People's Republic of China modified the "market unit" mass system to divide 1 jin into 10 instead of the traditional 16 liang for ease of calculation.
  - In Hong Kong and Macau the mass units were defined in terms of the British pound, specifically the 1878 definition of 0.45359 kg. The volume units were inherited from the Qing dynasty units, with a small difference compared to the 1915 definition. The length units were based on the unusually large chi found in the area of Guangdong (see Chi (unit) § Historical values). The source of the area unit is unknown, as it appears to be based on a different chi of 35.6 centimetres (14.0 in) (obtained by taking the square root of the metric value of cek3, the square-chi).
- Chinese names for metric units and prefixes. This includes time units.

=== Length ===
==== Chinese length units promulgated in 1915 ====
Table of Chinese length units promulgated in 1915
Unit name		Unit value			Notes
Pinyin	Character	Relative	Metric	Imperial	Notes
háo	毫	1/10000	32 μm	0.00126 in	
lí	釐 (T) or 厘 (S)	1/1000	0.32 mm	0.0126 in	
fēn	分	1/100	3.2 mm	0.126 in	
cùn	寸	1/10	32 mm	1.26 in	Chinese inch
chǐ	尺	1	0.32 m	12.6 in	Chinese foot
bù	步	5	1.6 m	5.2 ft	Chinese pace
zhàng	丈	10	3.2 m	3.50 yd	Chinese yard
yǐn	引	100	32 m	35.0 yd	
lǐ	里	1800	576 m	630 yd	Chinese mile, this li is not the small li above, which has a different character and tone

==== Chinese length units effective in 1930 ====
Chinese measurement law in 1929, effective 1 January 1930

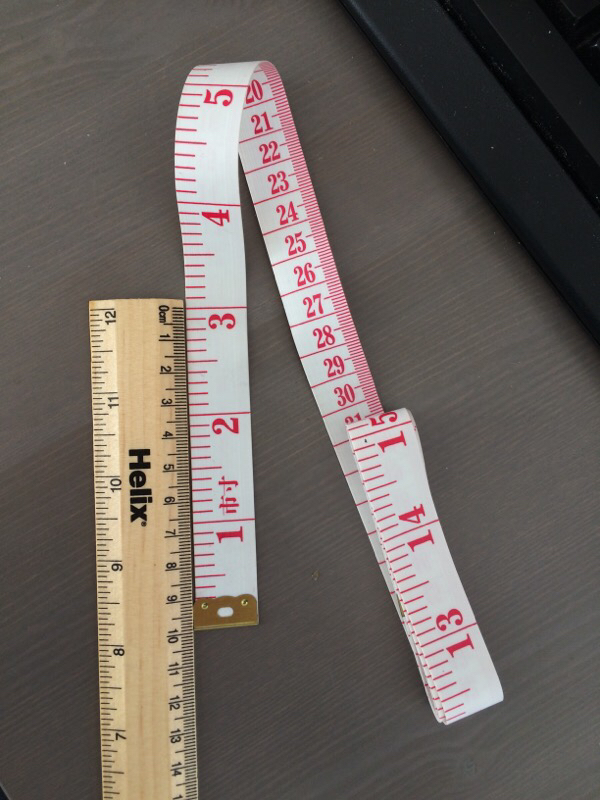
Chinese measuring tape

Table of Chinese length units effective in 1930
Unit name		Unit value			Notes
Pinyin	Character	Relative	Metric	Imperial	Notes
háo	毫	1/(10 000)	33 1/3 μm	0.00131 in	Chinese mil
lí	釐 (T) or 厘 (S)	1/1000	1/3 mm	0.0131 in	Chinese calibre
fēn	市分	1/100	3 1/3 mm	0.1312 in	Chinese line
cùn	市寸	1/10	3 1/3 cm	1.312 in	Chinese inch
chǐ	市尺	1	33 1/3 cm	13.12 in	Chinese foot
zhàng	市丈	10	3 1/3 m	3.645 yd	Chinese yard
yǐn	引	100	33 1/3 m	36.45 yd	Chinese chain
lǐ	市里	1500	500 m	546.8 yd	Chinese mile, this li is not the small li above, which has a different character and tone

==== Metric length units ====
The (Mainland) Chinese word for metre is 米 mǐ; this can take the Chinese standard SI prefixes (for "kilo-", "centi-", etc.). There exists, however, a system based on renaming traditional units, rounding them up to the closest metric unit.

- For the centimeter and above, the name is constructed as 公 gōng ("public", i.e. metric) followed by the traditional unit name. For example, a kilometre is popularly known as the 公里 gōnglǐ "metric lǐ".
- For smaller units, a different convention exists in the engineering field. The traditional unit is appropriated without adding the gōng prefix. For example, the Chinese word 絲 (T) or 丝 (S) sī is used to express 0.01 mm.

Table of Chinese length units
Name			Value		Note
Customary		PRC Standard	Meters	Metric value	Note
Pinyin	Characters	PRC Standard	Meters	Metric value	Note
hū	忽	微米	1/1000000	1 μm	
sī	絲 (T) or 丝 (S)	忽米	1/100000	10 μm	1959 standard name for centimillimetre, not seen in newer standards.
háo	毫	絲米 (T) or 丝米 (S)	1/10000	100 μm	1959 standard name for centimillimetre, not seen in newer standards.
lí	釐 (T) or 厘 (S)	毫米	1/1000	1 mm	
gōngfēn	公分	釐米(T) or 厘米(S)	1/100	10 mm	
gōngcùn	公寸	分米	1/10	100 mm	
gōngchǐ	公尺	米	1	1 m	
gōngzhàng	公丈	十米	10	10 m	
gōngyǐn	公引	百米	100	100 m	
gōnglǐ	公里	千米	1000	1000 m	

The Republic of China uses the gōng-prefixed names as the standard, legal names of the corresponding units.

==== Hong Kong and Macau length units ====
Table of Chinese length units in Hong Kong and Macau
Name				Value			Notes
Jyutping	Character	English	Portuguese	Relative	Metric	Imperial	Notes
fan1	分	fan	condorim	1/100	3.71475 mm	0.1463 in	
cyun3	寸	tsun	ponto	1/10	37.1475 mm	1.463 in	Hong Kong and Macau inch
cek3	尺	chek	côvado	1	371.475 mm	1.219 ft	Hong Kong and Macau foot

These correspond to the measures listed simply as "China" in The Measures, Weights, & Moneys of All Nations.

=== Area ===
==== Chinese area units promulgated in 1915 ====
Table of Chinese area units promulgated in 1915
Name		Value			Notes
Pinyin	Character	Relative	Metric	Imperial	Notes
háo	毫	1/1000	0.6144 m^{2}	0.7348 sq yd	
lí	釐 (T) or 厘 (S)	1/100	6.144 m^{2}	7.348 sq yd	
fēn	分	1/10	61.44 m^{2}	73.48 sq yd	
mǔ	畝 (T) or 亩 (S)	1	614.4 m^{2}	734.82 sq yd	Chinese acre, or 60 square zhang
qǐng	頃 (T) or 顷 (S)	100	6.144 ha	15.18 acre	Chinese hide

Table of Chinese square units effective in 1915
Name		Value			Notes
Pinyin	Character	Relative	Metric	Imperial	Notes
fāng cùn	方寸	1/100	10.24 cm^{2}	1.587 sq in	square cun
fāng chǐ	方尺	1	0.1024 m^{2}	1.102 sq ft	square chi
fāng zhàng	方丈	100	10.24 m^{2}	110.2 sq ft	square zhang

==== Chinese area units effective in 1930 ====
Table of Chinese area units effective in 1930
Name		Value			Notes
Pinyin	Character	Relative	Metric	Imperial	Notes
háo	毫	1/1000	2/3 m^{2}	7.18 sq ft	
lí	釐 (T) or 厘 (S)	1/100	6 2/3 m^{2}	7.973 sq yd	
fēn	市分	1/10	66 2/3 m^{2}	79.73 sq yd	
mǔ	畝 (T) or 亩 (S)	1	666 2/3 m^{2}	797.3 sq yd 0.1647 acre	Chinese acre 6000 square chi per Article 5 of the 1930 Law (六千平方尺定為一畝); 60 square zhang 1/15 of a hectare
qǐng	頃 (T) or 顷 (S)	100	6 2/3 ha	16.47 acre	Chinese hide

Table of Chinese square units effective in 1930
Name		Value			
Pinyin	Character	Relative	Metric	Imperial	Notes
fāng cùn	方寸	1/100	11 1/9 cm^{2}	1.722 sq in	square cun
fāng chǐ	方尺	1	1/9 m^{2}	172.2 sq in 1.196 sq ft	square chi
fāng zhàng	方丈	100	11 1/9 m^{2}	119.6 sq ft 13.29 sq yd	square zhang

==== Metric and other area units ====
Metric and other standard length units can be squared by the addition of the prefix 平方 píngfāng. For example, a square kilometre is 平方公里 píngfāng gōnglǐ.

==== Macau area units ====
Table of Chinese area units in Macau
Name			Value			
Jyutping	Portuguese	Character	Relative value	Relation to traditional Chinese units (Macau)	Metric value	Imperial value
cek3	côvado	尺	1	1/25鋪	0.1269 m^{2}	1.366 sq ft
pou3		鋪	25	1/4丈	3.1725 m^{2}	34.15 sq ft 3.794 sq yd
zoeng6	braça	丈	100	1/6分	12.69 m^{2}	136.6 sq ft 15.18 sq yd
fan1	condorim	分	600	1/10畝	76.14 m^{2}	91.06 sq yd
mau5	maz	畝 (T) or 亩 (S)	6000	None	761.4 m^{2}	910.6 sq yd

The units cek3 and zoeng6 are also names of traditional length units. This is an ancient practice with Chinese units of measurement, where area units derived by squaring length units simply take on the same name. Modern derivations would add a prefix 方 or 平方 "square".

=== Volume ===
These units are used to measure cereal grains, among other things. In imperial times, the physical standard for these was the jialiang.

==== Chinese volume units promulgated in 1915 ====
Table of Chinese volume units effective in 1915
Name		Value				Notes
Pinyin	Character	Relative	Metric	US	Imperial	Notes
sháo	勺	1/100	10.354688 mL	0.3501 fl oz	0.3644 fl oz	
gě	合	1/10	103.54688 mL	3.501 fl oz	3.644 fl oz	
shēng	升	1	1.0354688 L	2.188 pt	1.822 pt	
dǒu	斗	10	10.354688 L	2.735 gal	2.278 gal	
hú	斛	50	51.77344 L	13.68 gal	11.39 gal	
dàn	石	100	103.54688 L	27.35 gal	22.78 gal	

==== Chinese volume units effective in 1930 ====
Table of Chinese volume units effective in 1930
Name		Value				Notes
Pinyin	Character	Relative	Metric	US	Imperial	Notes
cuō	撮	1/1000	1 mL	0.0338 fl oz	0.0352 fl oz	millilitre
sháo	勺	1/100	10 mL	0.3381 fl oz	0.3520 fl oz	centilitre
gě	合	1/10	100 mL	3.381 fl oz	3.520 fl oz	decilitre
shēng	市升	1	1 L	2.113 pt	1.760 pt	litre
dǒu	市斗	10	10 L	21.13 pt 2.64 gal	17.60 pt 2.20 gal	decalitre
dàn	市石	100	100 L	26.41 gal	22.0 gal	hectolitre

==== Metric volume units ====
In the case of volume, the market and metric shēng coincide, being equal to one litre as shown in the table. The Chinese standard SI prefixes (for "milli-", "centi-", etc.) may be added to this word shēng.

Units of volume can also be obtained from any standard unit of length using the prefix 立方 lìfāng ("cubic"), as in 立方米 lìfāng mǐ for one cubic metre.

==== Macau volume units ====
Table of Chinese volume units in Macau
Name		Relation to traditional Chinese units (Macau)	Metric value
Jyutping	Character	Relation to traditional Chinese units (Macau)	Metric value
cyut3	撮	1/10甘特	1.031 L
gam1 dak6	甘特	1/10石	10.31 L
sek6	石	None	103.1 L

=== Mass ===
These units are used to measure the mass of objects. They are also famous for measuring monetary objects such as gold and silver.

==== Chinese mass units promulgated in 1915 ====
Table of Chinese mass units promulgated in 1915
Name		Value			Notes
Pinyin	Character	Relative	Metric	Imperial	Notes
háo	毫	1/10000	3.7301 mg	0.0001316 oz	
lí	釐	1/1000	37.301 mg	0.001316 oz	cash
fēn	分	1/100	373.01 mg	0.01316 oz	candareen
qián	錢	1/10	3.7301 g	0.1316 oz	mace or Chinese dram
liǎng	兩	1	37.301 g	1.316 oz	tael or Chinese ounce
jīn	斤	16	596.816 g	1.316 lb	catty or Chinese pound

==== Mass units in the Republic of China since 1930 ====
Table of mass units in the Republic of China since 1930
Name		Value			Notes
Pinyin	Character	Relative	Metric	Imperial	Notes
sī	絲	1/1600000	312.5 μg	0.00001102 oz	
háo	毫	1/160000	3.125 mg	0.0001102 oz	
lí	市釐	1/16000	31.25 mg	0.001102 oz	cash
fēn	市分	1/1600	312.5 mg	0.01102 oz	candareen
qián	市錢	1/160	3.125 g	0.1102 oz	mace or Chinese dram
liǎng	市兩	1/16	31.25 g	1.102 oz	tael or Chinese ounce
jīn	市斤	1	500 g	1.102 lb	catty or Chinese pound
dàn	擔	100	50 kg	110.2 lb	picul or Chinese hundredweight

==== Mass units in the People's Republic of China since 1959 ====
Table of mass units in the People's Republic of China since 1959
Name		Value			Notes
Pinyin	Character	Relative	Metric	Imperial	Notes
lí	市厘	1/10000	50 mg	0.001764 oz	cash
fēn	市分	1/1000	500 mg	0.01764 oz	candareen
qián	市錢	1/100	5 g	0.1764 oz	mace or Chinese dram
liǎng	市兩	1/10	50 g	1.764 oz	tael or Chinese ounce
jīn	市斤	1	500 g	1.102 lb	catty or Chinese pound formerly 16 liang = 1 jin
dàn	市擔	100	50 kg	110.2 lb	picul or Chinese hundredweight

==== Metric mass units ====
The Chinese word for gram is 克 kè; this can take the Chinese standard SI prefixes (for "milli-", "deca-", and so on). A kilogram, however, is commonly called 公斤 gōngjīn, i.e. a metric jīn.

The PRC translated the non-SI quintal (100 kg) as 公擔 gōngdàn ("metric dàn") in 1959, but abandoned the unit in newer publications.

==== Hong Kong and Macau mass units ====
Table of Chinese mass units in Hong Kong and Macau
Name				Value				Notes
Jyutping	Character	English	Portuguese	Relative value	Relation to traditional Chinese units (Macau)	Metric value	Imperial value	Notes
lei4	厘	li, cash	liz	1/16000	1/10 condorim	37.79931 mg	0.02133 dr	Not defined in Hong Kong. Macanese definition may not be correct when dividing catty.
fan1	分	fen, fan, candareen	condorim	1/1600	1/10 maz	377.9936375 mg	0.2133 dr	Macanese definition of 377.9931 mg may not be correct when dividing catty.
cin4	錢	qian, tsin, mace	maz	1/160	1/10 tael	3.779936375 g	2.1333 dr	Macanese definition of 3.779931 g may not be correct when dividing catty.
loeng2	兩	liang, leung, tael	tael	1/16	1/16 cate	37.79936375 g	1.3333 oz	Macanese definition of 37.79931 g may not be correct when dividing catty.
gan1	斤	jin, kan, catty	cate	1	1/100 pico	604.78982 g	1.3333 lb	Hong Kong and Macau share the definition.
daam3	擔	dan, tam, picul	pico	100	None	60.478982 kg	133.3333 lb	Hong Kong and Macau share the definition.

==== Hong Kong troy units ====
These are used for trading precious metals such as gold and silver.

Table of mass (Hong Kong troy) units
Name		Value			Notes
English	Character	Relative	Metric	Imperial	Notes
fen (candareen) troy	金衡分	1/100	374.29 mg	0.096 drt	
qian (mace) troy	金衡錢	1/10	3.7429 g	0.96 drt	
liang (tael) troy	金衡兩	1	37.429 g	1.2 ozt	

=== Time ===
Modern Chinese time units largely correspond one-to-one to Western units.

Table of modern time units
Name		Value	Notes
Pinyin	Character	Value	Notes
miǎo	秒	1 second	
fēn	分	1 minute	
kè	刻	15 minutes (i.e. one quarter-hour)	Same definition since Qing dynasty
shí xiǎoshí	時 小時	1 hour	shí is more technical than xiǎoshí. Also used is diǎn for reporting the time-of-day (3 diǎn means 3 o'clock)
rì / tiān	日/天	1 day	

In addition to the above units, the ancient shíchén is occasionally used with the value of exactly 2 hours.

== Historiography ==
As there were hundreds of unofficial measures in use, the bibliography is quite vast. The editions of Wu Chenglou's 1937 History of Chinese Measurement were the usual standard up to the 1980s or so, but rely mostly on surviving literary accounts. Newer research has put more emphasis on archeological discoveries. Qiu Guangming & Zhang Yanming's 2005 bilingual Concise History of Ancient Chinese Measures and Weights summarizes these findings. A relatively recent and comprehensive bibliography, organized by period studied, has been compiled in 2012 by Cao & al.; for a shorter list, see Wilkinson's year 2000 Chinese History.

== See also ==
- Chinese numbers and classifiers
- Heavenly Stems and Earthly Branches
- Japanese, Korean, and Vietnamese units of measurement
- Taiwanese and Hong Kong units of measurement
- Units, systems, and history of measurement
