= Li (unit) =

Traditional Chinese unit of distance

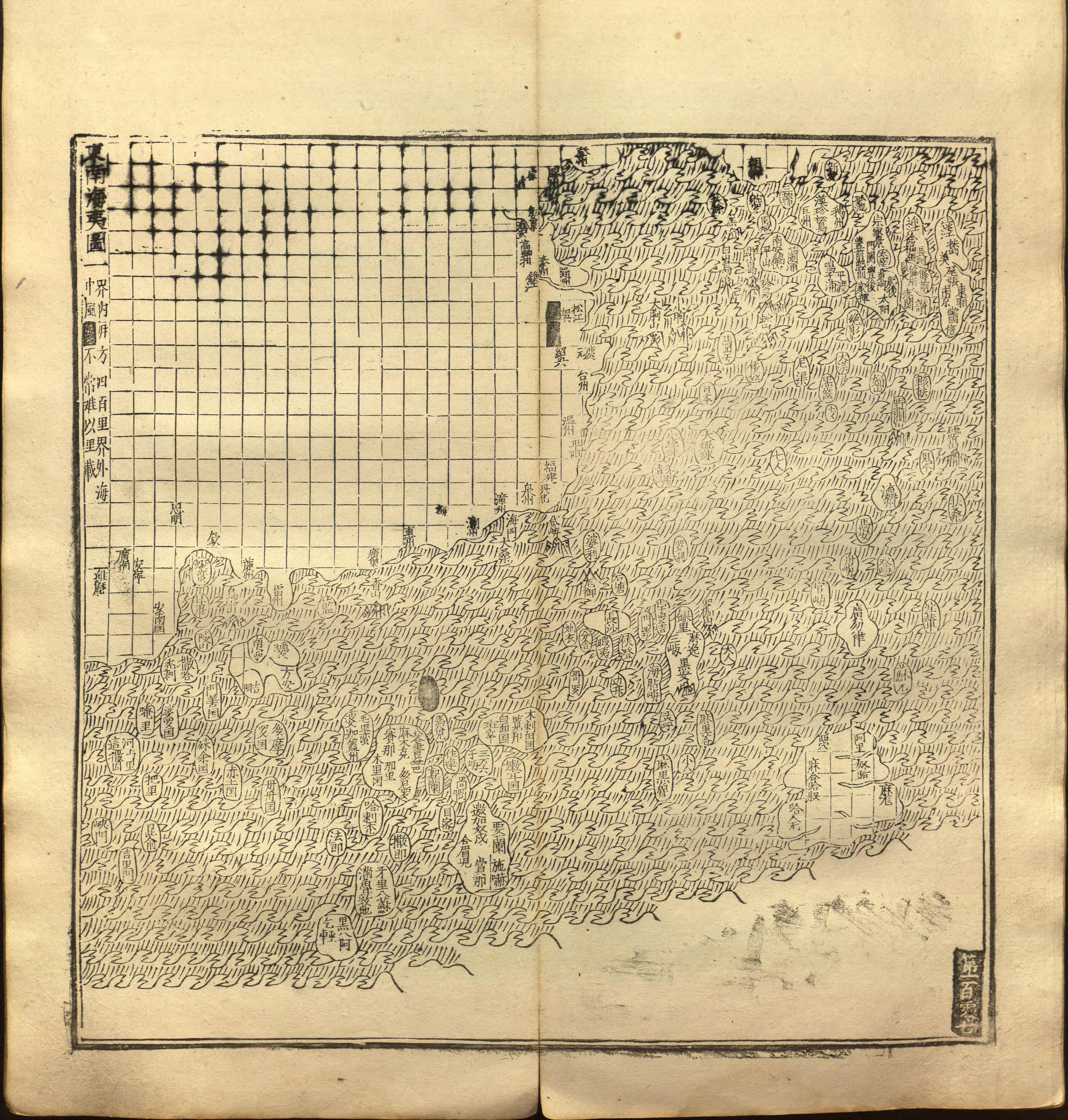
Map of the eastern South China Sea from 1588; each grid square is 400 li (about 133 km or 80 miles).

Li or ri (Chinese: 里; pinyin: lǐ, or Chinese: 市里; pinyin: shìlǐ) is a traditional Chinese unit of distance. The li has varied considerably over time but was usually about one third of an English mile and now has a standardized length of a half-kilometer (500 meters or 1,640 feet or 0.311 miles). This is then divided into 1,500 chi, or "Chinese feet".

The character 里 combines the characters for "field" (田; tián) and "earth" (土; tǔ), since it was considered to be about the length of a single village. As late as the 1940s, a "li" did not represent a fixed measure but could be longer or shorter depending on the effort required to cover the distance. This traditional unit, in terms of historical usage and distance proportion, can be considered the East Asian counterpart to the Western league unit. However, in English league commonly means "3 miles."

There is also another li (simplified Chinese: 厘; traditional Chinese: 釐; pinyin: lí) that indicates a unit of length 1/1000 of a chi, but it is used much less commonly. This li is used in the People's Republic of China as the equivalent of the centi- prefix in metric units, thus límǐ (厘米) for centimeter. The tonal difference makes it distinguishable to speakers of Chinese, but unless specifically noted otherwise, any reference to li will always refer to the longer traditional unit and not to either the shorter unit or the kilometer.

== Changing values ==
Like most traditional Chinese measurements, the li was reputed to have been established by the Yellow Emperor at the founding of Chinese civilization around 2600 BCE and standardized by Yu the Great of the Xia dynasty six hundred years later. Although the value varied from state to state during the Spring and Autumn period and Warring States periods, historians give a general value to the li of 405 meters prior to the Qin dynasty imposition of its standard in the 3rd century BCE.

The basic Chinese traditional unit of distance was the chi. As its value changed over time, so did the li's. In addition, the number of chi per li was sometimes altered. To add further complexity, under the Qin dynasty, the li was set at 360 "paces" (步; bù) but the number of chi per bu was subsequently changed from 6 to 5, shortening the li by 1/6. Thus, the Qin li of about 576 meters became (with other changes) the Han li, which was standardized at 415.8 meters.

The basic units of measurement remained stable over the Qin and Han periods. A bronze imperial standard measure, dated 9 CE, had been preserved at the Imperial Palace in Beijing and came to light in 1924. This has allowed very accurate conversions to modern measurements, which has provided a new and extremely useful additional tool in the identification of place names and routes. These measurements have been confirmed in many ways including the discovery of a number of rulers found at archaeological sites, and careful measurements of distances between known points. The Han li was calculated by Dubs to be 415.8 metres and all indications are that this is a precise and reliable determination.

Evolving values of the li
Dynasty	Period	SI length
Xia	2100–1600 BCE	405 m
Western Zhou	1045–771 BCE	358 m
Eastern Zhou	770–250 BCE	416 m
Qin	221–206 BCE	415.8 m
Han	205 BCE – 220 CE	415.8 m
Tang	618–907 CE	323 m
Qing	1644–1911 CE	537–645 m
ROC	1911–1984	500–545 m
PRC	1984–present	500 m

Under the Tang dynasty (618–907 CE), the li was approximately 323 meters.

In the late Manchu or Qing dynasty, the number of chi was increased from 1,500 per li to 1,800. This had a value of 2115 feet or 644.6 meters. In addition, the Qing added a longer unit called the tu, which was equal to 150 li (96.7 km).

These changes were undone by the Republic of China of Chiang Kai-shek, who adopted the metric system in 1928. The Republic of China (now also known as Taiwan) continues not to use the li at all but only the kilometer (公里; gōnglǐ; 'common li').

Under Mao Zedong, the People's Republic of China reinstituted the traditional units as a measure of anti-imperialism and cultural pride before officially adopting the metric system in 1984. A place was made within this for the traditional units, which were restandardized to metric values. A modern li is thus set at exactly half a kilometer (500 meters). However, unlike the jin which is still frequently preferred in daily use over the kilogram, the li is almost never used. Nonetheless, its appearance in many phrases and sayings means that "kilometer" must always be specified by saying gōnglǐ in full.

== Cultural use ==
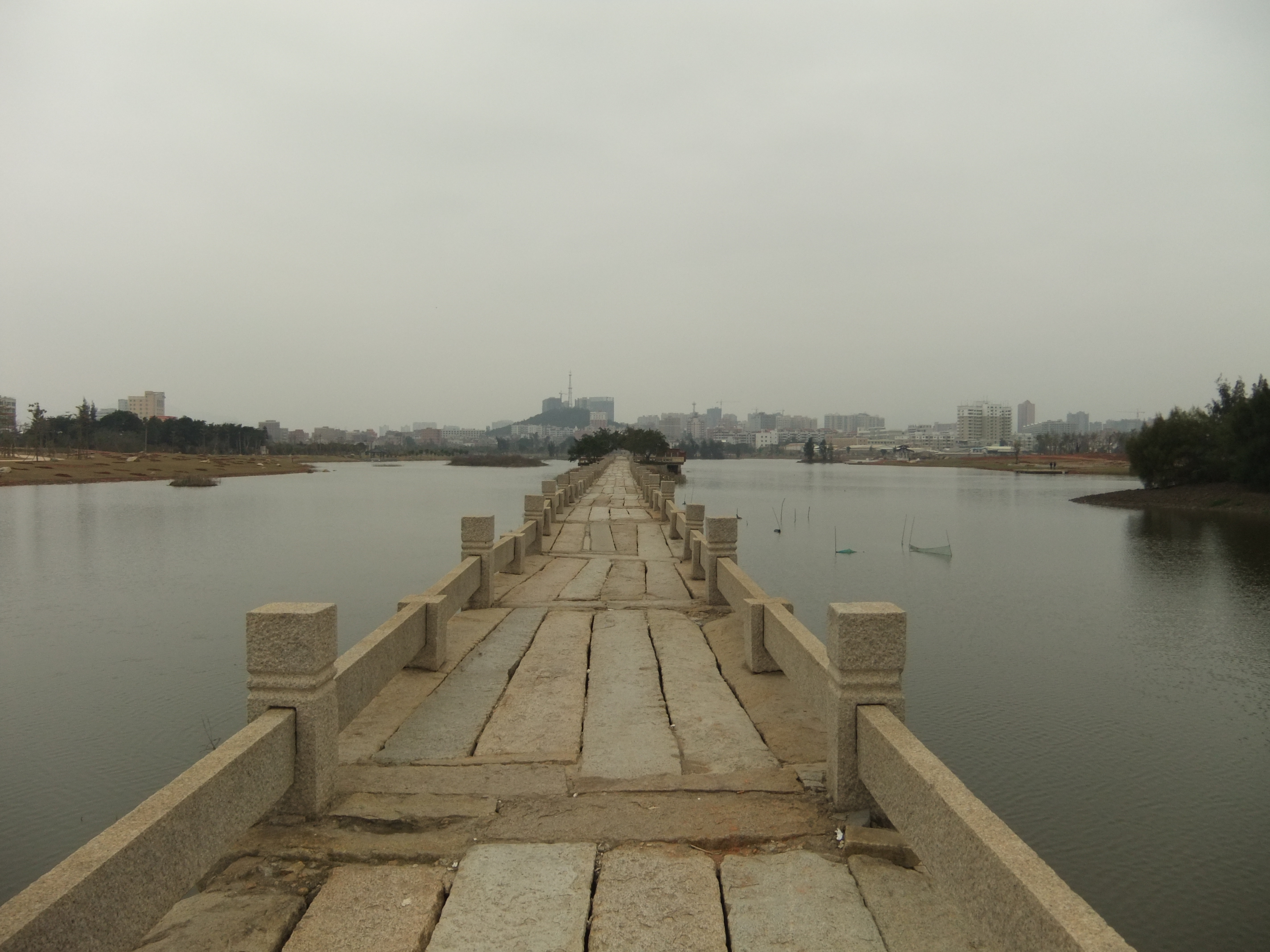
A section of the Song-era Anping Bridge in Fujian. The bridge is commonly known as the "Five-Li Bridge" due to its length.

As one might expect for the equivalent of "mile", li appears in many Chinese sayings, locations, and proverbs as an indicator of great distances or the exotic:

- One Chinese name for the Great Wall is the "Ten-Thousand-Li Long Wall" (萬里長城; 万里长城; Wànlǐchángchéng). As in Greek, the number "ten thousand" is used figuratively in Chinese to mean any "immeasurable" value and this title has never provided a literal distance of 10,000 li (5,000 km or 3,100 mi). The actual length of the modern Great Wall is around 42,000 li (21,000 km or 13,000 mi), over 4 times the name's proverbially "immeasurable" length.
- The Chinese proverb appearing in chapter 64 of the Tao Te Ching and commonly rendered as "A journey of a thousand miles begins with a single step" in fact refers to a thousand li: 千里之行，始於足下; Qiānlǐzhīxíng, shǐyúzúxià.
- The greatest horses of Chinese history – including Red Hare and Hualiu (驊騮) – are all referred to as "thousand-li horses" (千里馬; qiānlǐmǎ), since they could supposedly travel a thousand li (500 km or 310 mi) in a single day.
- Li is sometimes used in location names, for example: Wulipu (五里铺镇), Hubei; Ankang Wulipu Airport (安康五里铺机场), Shaanxi. Sanlitun (三里屯; Sānlǐtún; 'three li village') is an area in Beijing.
- In Journey to the West, Sun Wukong is said to be able to travel 108,000 li in a single somersault.

== Ri in Japan and Korea ==
The present day Korean ri/li (리, 里) and Japanese ri (里) are units of measurement that can be traced back to the Chinese li (里).

Although the Chinese unit was unofficially used in Japan since the Zhou dynasty, the countries officially adopted the measurement used by the Tang dynasty (618–907 CE). The ri of an earlier era in Japan was thus true to Chinese length, corresponding to six chō (c. 500–600 m), but later evolved to denote the distance that a person carrying a load would aim to cover on mountain roads in one hour. Thus, there had been various ri of 36, 40, and 48 chō. In the Edo period, the Tokugawa shogunate defined 1 ri as 36 chō, allowing other variants, and the Japanese government adopted this last definition in 1891. The Japanese ri was, at that time, fixed to the metric system, 216/55 ≈ 3.93 kilometres or about 2.44 miles. Therefore, one must be careful about the correspondence between chō and ri. See Kujūkuri Beach (99-ri beach) for a case.

삼천리 (三千里) Samcheon-ri, meaning "Three thousand li", is a traditional, poetic name used to refer to the entire Korean Peninsula, as that is the approximate distance from the northern to southern end of Korea; 3000 ri corresponds roughly to 1,200 km.

In South Korea, the ri unit currently in use is taken from the Han dynasty (206 BCE – 220 CE) li. It has a value of approximately 392.72 meters, or one tenth of the ri. The Aegukga, the national anthem of South Korea, mentions 3,000 ri.

The Aegukka, the national anthem of North Korea, also mentioned 3,000 ri from 1947 until 2024, when the reference was removed amidst souring inter-Korean relations and a shift in North Korean policy away from Korean reunification. Also in North Korea, the Chollima Movement, a campaign aimed at improving labour productivity, gets its name from Chŏllima, a mythical horse capable of traveling 1000 ri in a single day (chŏn + ri + ma in North Korean Romanization).

The Korean traditional song "Arirang" mentions one travelling 10 ri.

== See also ==
- Chinese units of measurement
- Japanese units of measurement
- Korean units of measurement
- League (unit) for a general discussion of league-style units
- Qianlima for more on "thousand-li horse" including North Korean Chollima
- Li (short)
