= Cun (unit) =

Chinese unit of length

Chinese name
- Chinese: 寸
Transcriptions
Standard Mandarin
- Hanyu Pinyin: cùn
- Wade–Giles: ts'un^{4}
- IPA: [tsʰwə̂n]

Japanese name
- Kanji: 寸
- Kana: すん
Transcriptions
- Revised Hepburn: sun

Korean name
- Hangul: 치
Transcriptions
- Revised Romanization: chi
- McCune–Reischauer: ch'i

Alternative Korean name
- Hangul: 촌
- Hanja: 寸
Transcriptions
- Revised Romanization: chon
- McCune–Reischauer: ch'on

Vietnamese name
- Vietnamese: thốn

Cun
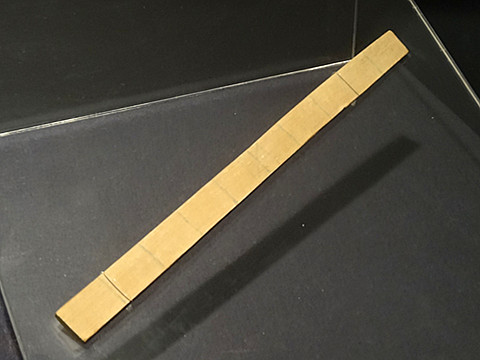
- Wooden ruler of the western Han dynasty, unearthed at Jinguan Pass Site in Jinta County

General information
- Unit system: Chinese unit
- Unit of: length

Conversions
1 cun in ...	... is equal to ...
- metric (SI) units: 1/30 m ~33.33 mm
- imperial/US units: ~1.3123 in

Tsun
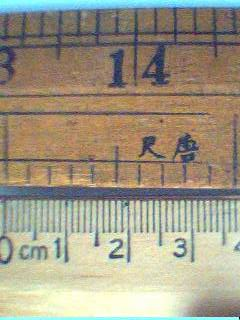
- A section of an old Hong Kong ruler, showing the last (10th) cun of a chi. One can see that the chi in that jurisdiction was exactly equal to 14 5/8 of an inch. A metric ruler is shown next to it for comparison.

General information
- Unit system: Chinese unit
- Unit of: length

Conversions
1 tsun in ...	... is equal to ...
- metric (SI) units: 37.1475 mm
- imperial/US units: 1 37/80 in

Sun
- Unit system: Japanese unit
- Unit of: length

Conversions
1 sun in ...	... is equal to ...
- metric (SI) units: 1/33 m ~30.30 mm
- imperial/US units: ~1.1930 in

A cun (Chinese: 寸; pinyin: cùn; IPA: [tsʰwə̂n]), often translated as the "Chinese inch", is a traditional Chinese unit of length. Its traditional measure is the width of a person's thumb at the knuckle, whereas the width of the two forefingers denotes 1.5 cun and the width of four fingers (except the thumb) side-by-side is 3 cuns. It continues to be used to chart acupuncture points on the human body, and, in various uses for traditional Chinese medicine.

The cun was part of a larger decimal system. A cun was made up of 10 fen, which depending on the period approximated lengths or widths of millet grains, and represented one-tenth of a chi ("Chinese foot"). In time the lengths were standardized, although to different values in different jurisdictions. (See Chi (unit) for details.)

In Hong Kong, using the traditional standard, it measures ~3.715 cm (~1.463 in) and is written "tsun". In the twentieth century in the Republic of China, the lengths were standardized to fit with the metric system, and in current usage in People's Republic of China and Taiwan it measures 3 1/3 cm (~1.312 in).

In Japan, the corresponding unit, sun (寸), was standardized at 1000/33 mm (3.0̅3̅ cm, ~1.193 in, or ~0.09942 ft).

== See also ==
- shaku
