= Zhàng =

Chinese unit of length equal to 10 chi

Zhang

Chinese name
- Chinese: 丈
Transcriptions
Standard Mandarin
- Hanyu Pinyin: zhàng
- Wade–Giles: chang4

Korean name
- Hangul: 장
- Hanja: 丈
Transcriptions
- Revised Romanization: jang
- McCune–Reischauer: chang

The zhàng (Chinese: 丈) is a customary Chinese unit of length equal to 10 chi (Chinese feet). Its value varied over time and place with different values of the chi, although it was occasionally standardized. In 1915, the Republic of China set it equal to about 3.2 meters or 3.50 yards. In 1930, this was revised to an exact value of 3⅓ meters (about 3.645 yd).

It is not commonly used in mainland China today but appears in traditional Chinese architecture, where it was commonly used to measure bays.

In Japanese units of measurement, the jō (丈) is equivalent to ten shaku, or 3.03 meters.

== See also ==
- Chinese units of measurement
