= Chi (unit) =

Traditional Chinese unit of length

Chinese name
- Chinese: 尺
Transcriptions
Standard Mandarin
- Hanyu Pinyin: chǐ
- Bopomofo: ㄔˇ
- Wade–Giles: ch'ih^{3}
- Tongyong Pinyin: chǐh
- Yale Romanization: chř
Yue: Cantonese
- Yale Romanization: chek
- Jyutping: cek3

Japanese name
- Kanji: 尺
- Kana: しゃく
Transcriptions
- Revised Hepburn: shaku

Korean name
- Hangul: 자
Transcriptions
- Revised Romanization: ja
- McCune–Reischauer: cha

Alternative Korean name
- Hangul: 척
- Hanja: 尺
Transcriptions
- Revised Romanization: cheok
- McCune–Reischauer: ch'ŏk

Chi (China)
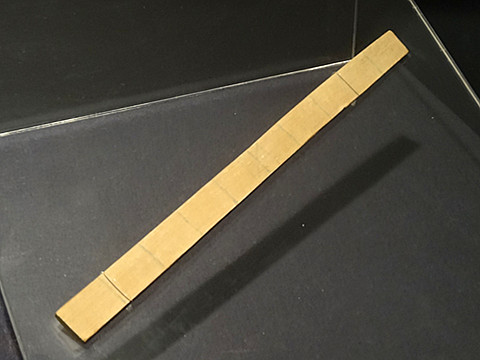
- Wooden ruler of the western Han dynasty, unearthed at Jinguan Pass Site in Jinta County

General information
- Unit system: traditional Chinese unit
- Unit of: length

Conversions
| 1 chi (china) in ... | ... is equal to ... |
- metric (SI) units: 1/3 m ~333.3 mm
- imperial/US units: ~13.123 in

Chek (Hong Kong)
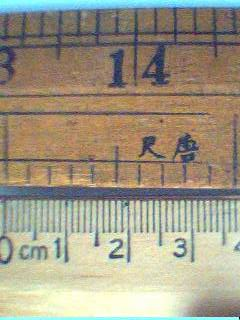
- a section of an old Hong Kong ruler, showing the last (10th) cun of a chi. One can see that the chi in that jurisdiction was exactly equal to 14 5/8 of an inch. A metric ruler is shown next to it for comparison

General information
- Unit system: traditional Chinese unit
- Unit of: length

Conversions
| 1 chek (hong kong) in ... | ... is equal to ... |
- metric (SI) units: 371.475 mm
- imperial/US units: 14 5/8 in

Chi (Taiwan)
- Unit system: traditional Taiwan unit
- Unit of: length

Conversions
| 1 chi (taiwan) in ... | ... is equal to ... |
- metric (SI) units: 10/33 m ~303.0 mm
- imperial/US units: ~11.930 in

The chi (Tongyong Pinyin chih) is a traditional Chinese unit of length. Although it is often translated as the "Chinese foot", its length was originally derived from the distance measured by a human hand, from the tip of the thumb to the tip of the forefinger, and is similar to the ancient span. It first appeared during China's Shang dynasty approximately 3,000 years ago and has since been adopted by other East Asian cultures such as Japan (shaku), Korea (ja/cheok), and Vietnam (thước). Its present value is standardized at around one-third meter (1 ft 1 in), although the exact standards vary among the mainland of the People's Republic of China, its special administrative region of Hong Kong, and Taiwan.

In its ancient and modern forms, the chi is divided into 10 smaller units known as cun (the "Chinese inch"). 10 chi are equal to 1 zhàng.

== Modern values ==
In mainland China, the chi is been defined as exactly 1/3 of a meter, i.e., 33 1/3 cm (13.1 in). However, in Hong Kong the corresponding unit, pronounced tsek (cek3) in Cantonese, is defined as exactly 0.371475 m (1.21875 ft), or 1 ft 2 5/8 in. The two units are sometimes referred to in English as "Chinese foot" and "Hong Kong foot".

In Taiwan, chi is the same as the Japanese shaku, i.e., 10/33 meter (11.93 in).

== Historical values ==
The study of ancient rulers and other artifacts whose size in the contemporary chi was known allowed modern researchers to surmise that during the 2nd century BC to 3rd century AD the (Qin dynasty to Han dynasty to the Three Kingdoms period), the value of the chi varied between 23.1 and 24.3 cm (9.1 and 9.6 in). Even earlier, during the Warring States era, the value of chi was essentially the same.

It is thought that the ancient Chinese astronomers also used the chi as an angular unit; modern analysis of historical records indicates that it may have been equal to one degree.

In the 19th century, the value of the chi, depending on the part of the country and the application, varied between 31 and 36 cm (12 and 14 in). According to an 1864 British report, in most of China the chi used by engineers in public works was equal to 12.71 inches (32.3 cm), the surveyors' chi was 12.058 inches (30.63 cm), while the value generally used for measuring distances was 12.17 inches (30.9 cm). In Guangzhou, however, the chi used for local trade varied from 14.625 to 14.81 inches (37.15 to 37.62 cm) – i.e., very close to the modern chek. The value fixed by a Sino-British treaty for the purposes of customs duties in Hong Kong was 14.1 inches (36 cm).

In 1905 the Korean Empire defined the cheok as 10000/33000 of a meter. In 1964, South Korea fully adopted SI units.

== Usage in Chinese language ==
Due to its long history and its widespread usage, chi (along with cun) has also seen metaphorical usages in the Chinese language. For example, chi cun (Chinese: 尺寸), a word made up of the units chi and cun, refers to the dimensions of an object, while the idiom "dé cùn jìn chǐ" (Chinese: 得寸進尺; lit. 'deserving a cun and asking for a chi') means "extremely greedy".

In informal use in China, chi is also sometimes used to refer to the United States customary foot or British imperial foot.

== See also ==
- Qarysh (Turkic equivalent)
- Wajab (Persian equivalent)
