= Dollar (Jiaozhou Bay Leased Territory) =

Currency of Jiaozhou Bay Leased Territory

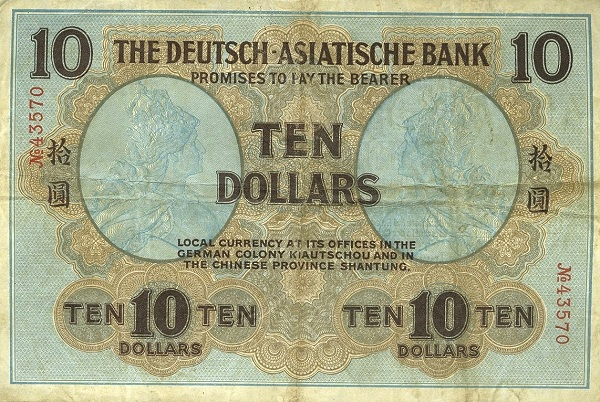
Reverse of a 1907 $10 note printed in English

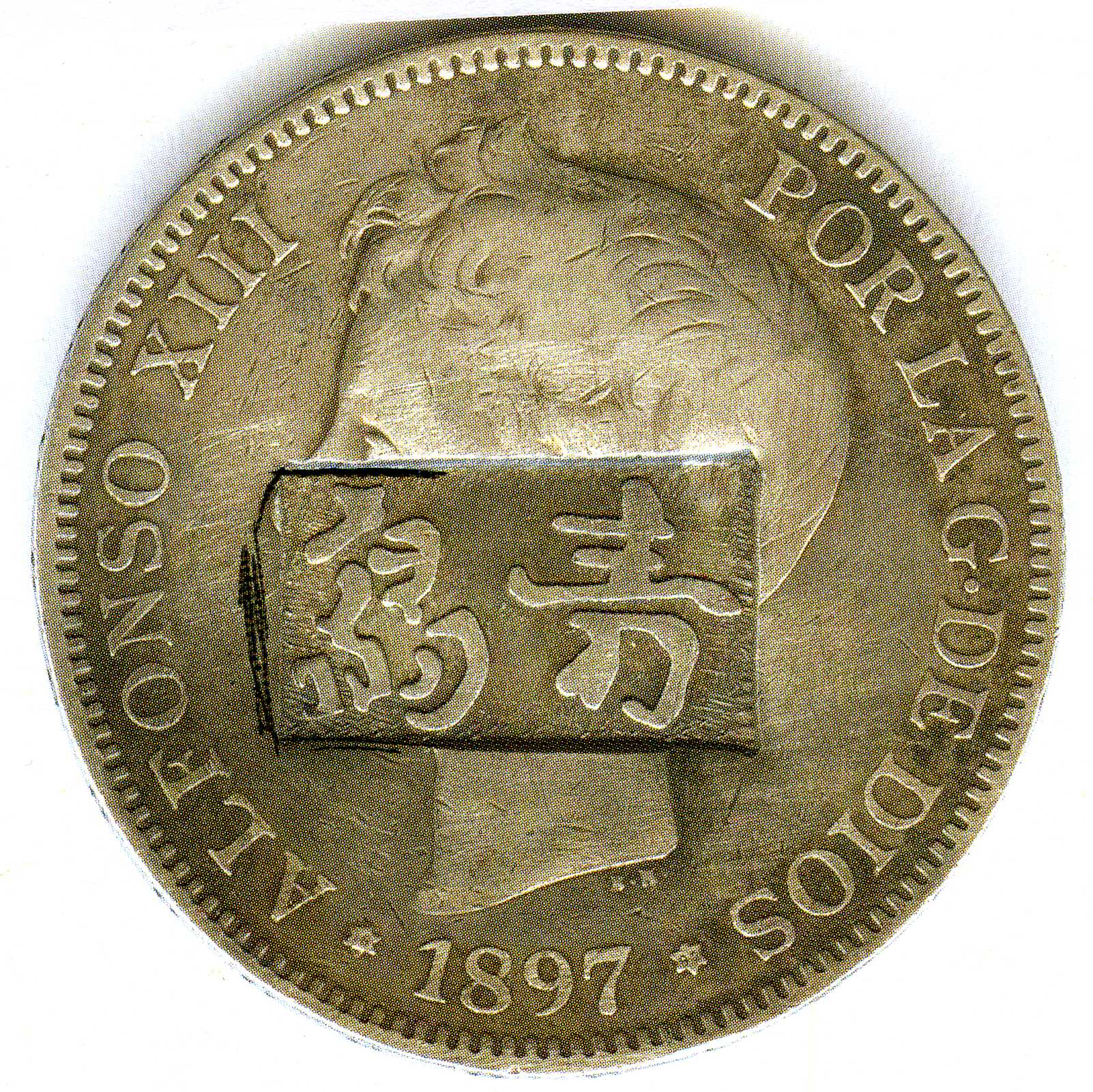
A Spanish dollar overprinted for use in Jiaozhou Bay

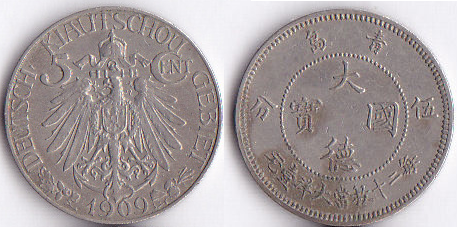
5-cent coin from the Jiaozhou Bay colony

The dollar, sometimes distinguished in English as the Jiaozhou, Kiaochow, or Kiau Chau dollar and in German as the Kiautschou dollar, was the currency used by the German Empire's Jiaozhou Bay Leased Territory around Qingdao on the southeastern Shandong Peninsula. The dollar was divided into 100 cents. Dollar banknotes (1907–1914) and cent coins (1909) were issued by the Deutsch-Asiatische Bank, pegged to the value of the silver Spanish or Mexican dollar and the Qing yuan. The dollar notes were issued in both German and English and supplemented by overprinting of silver dollar coins from other jurisdictions.

== History ==
Dollar banknotes were printed from 1907 to 1914 in denominations of $1, $5, $10, $25, and $50. 610,000 5¢ and 670,000 10¢ cupronickel coins were issued in 1909. The Deutsch-Asiatische Bank's banknotes were printed by Giesecke and Devrient in Leipzig, Germany, and then shipped to East Asia. The coins were struck at the imperial mint in Berlin. The ship transporting the 1914 banknote issue to Qingdao—which included new $100 and $200 bills as well—was intercepted by a British submarine, so those notes were never in circulation.

The Jiaozhou Bay concession had permission from the Chinese government to allow its notes to circulate throughout Shandong Province, so that many more notes were issued than those strictly required for the colony's commerce. The coins were declared the sole legal tender of the colony, forcing Chinese and foreign traders to exchange other silver dollars and copper cash for them.

Immediately following the 1914 Japanese occupation of Qingdao at the onset of World War I, there was about $15,000 specie in circulation and another $750,000 in banknotes valued at a roughly 1:2.5 exchange rate with gold-backed American dollars. More than $1 million in notes were burned during the siege and, though more coins had been minted and in use, much of it was dumped into Jiaozhou Bay to keep it out of Japanese hands. In the same way, the banknotes had been redeemed using the assets of the bank's other branches in East Asia and then destroyed, maintaining the value of the remaining currency despite the loss of the colony. Allied with important trading partners and facing a mass exodus of their business to Jinan, the Japanese occupation seized the assets of the Deutsche-Asiatische Bank but allowed the Yokohama Specie Bank and HSBC to continue supporting and honoring its notes, which continued to circulate in the now Japanese colony even in preference to the occupation's own silver-backed yen.

== Jiaozhou tael ==
Much of the foreign commerce was reckoned in silver taels, with the Qingdao, Tsingtao, Tsingtau, Jiaozhou, Kiaochow, or Kiau Chau tael exchanged at 105 to each 100 haiguan tael. The Deutsch-Asiatische Bank never issued tael notes in Tianjin or Qingdao, although its other Chinese branches issued them in denominations of 1, 5, 10, and 20 tl. from 1907–1914. As with the dollar banknotes, the tael bills were printed by Giesecke and Devrient in Leipzig and the last issue—which included new 50, 100, and 500 tl. notes—were intercepted by the British and never circulated.

== Design ==
Jiaozhou dollars shared a similar design to the notes issued by the Deutsch-Asiatische Bank's other four main branches in Beijing, Tianjin, Shanghai, and Hankou (now part of Wuhan). The obverse featured a large image of Germania crowned and holding a spear and shield. The shield was emblazoned with the imperial coat of arms and its eagle was also shown to the top left with the letters DAB across its chest. On the bottom left was a frontal view of the Chinese imperial dragon. The reverse held two portraits of Germania facing one another and the bill's value in English. Denominations of $25 or 20 tl. and above measured 135 by 200 millimeters (5.3 in × 7.9 in) and lower denominations measured 125 by 187 millimeters (4.9 in × 7.4 in). All bills were watermarked.

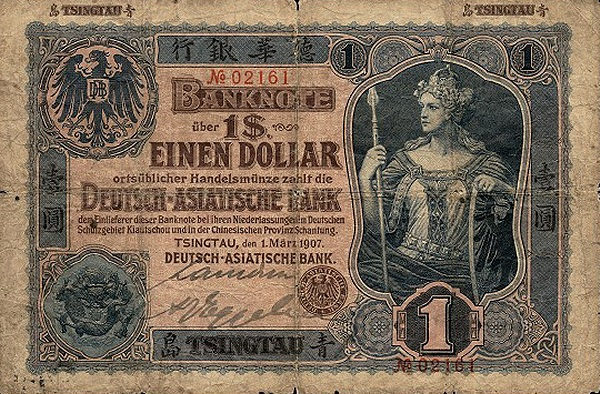
$1 bill

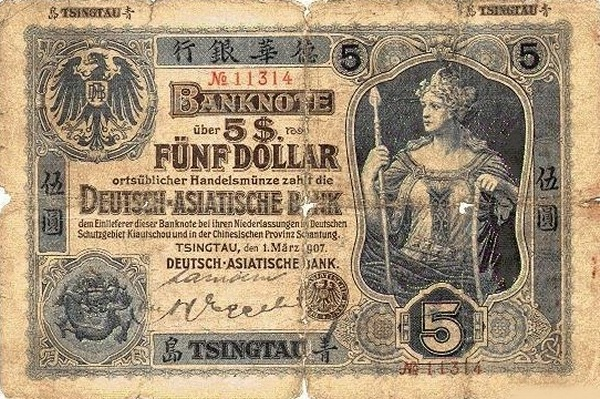
$5 bill

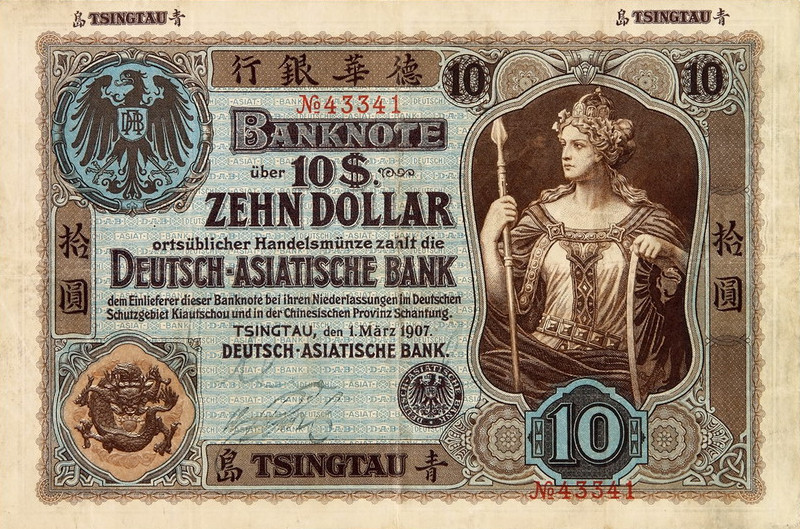
$10 bill

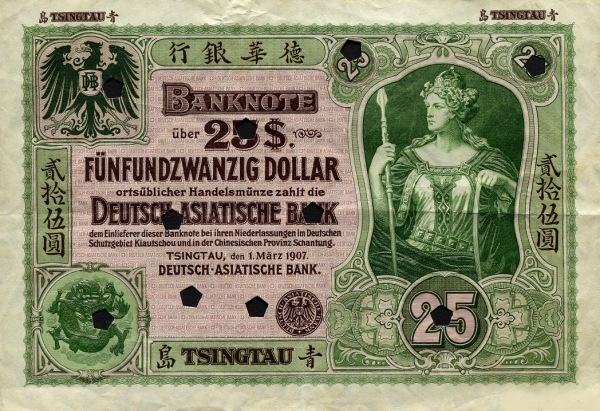
$25 bill

The cupronickel coins were made from an alloy of 75% copper and 25% nickel, the 5¢ pieces with a 19 mm (0.7 in) diameter and the 10¢ pieces with a 22 mm (0.9 in) diameter. The obverse featured a German eagle with the inscription Deutsch Kiautschou Gebiet ("German Jiaozhou Territory") above, 1909 below, and the coins' value—5 Cent or 10 Cent—to the left and right of the eagle's head. The reverse featured an inner circle inscribed in the traditional Chinese fashion (top→bottom→right→left) with 大德國寶 (Dàdé guóbǎo, "Imperial German currency") and an outer circle reading 青島 ("Qingdao") on top, 伍分 (wǔ fēn, "five cents") or 壹角 (yī jiǎo, "one dime") across the middle, and 每二十枚當大洋壹元 (měi èrshí méidāng Dàyáng yī yuán) or 每十枚當大洋壹元 (měi shí méidāng Dàyáng yī yuán)—"every twenty" or "ten coins equals one overseas dollar"—on the bottom.

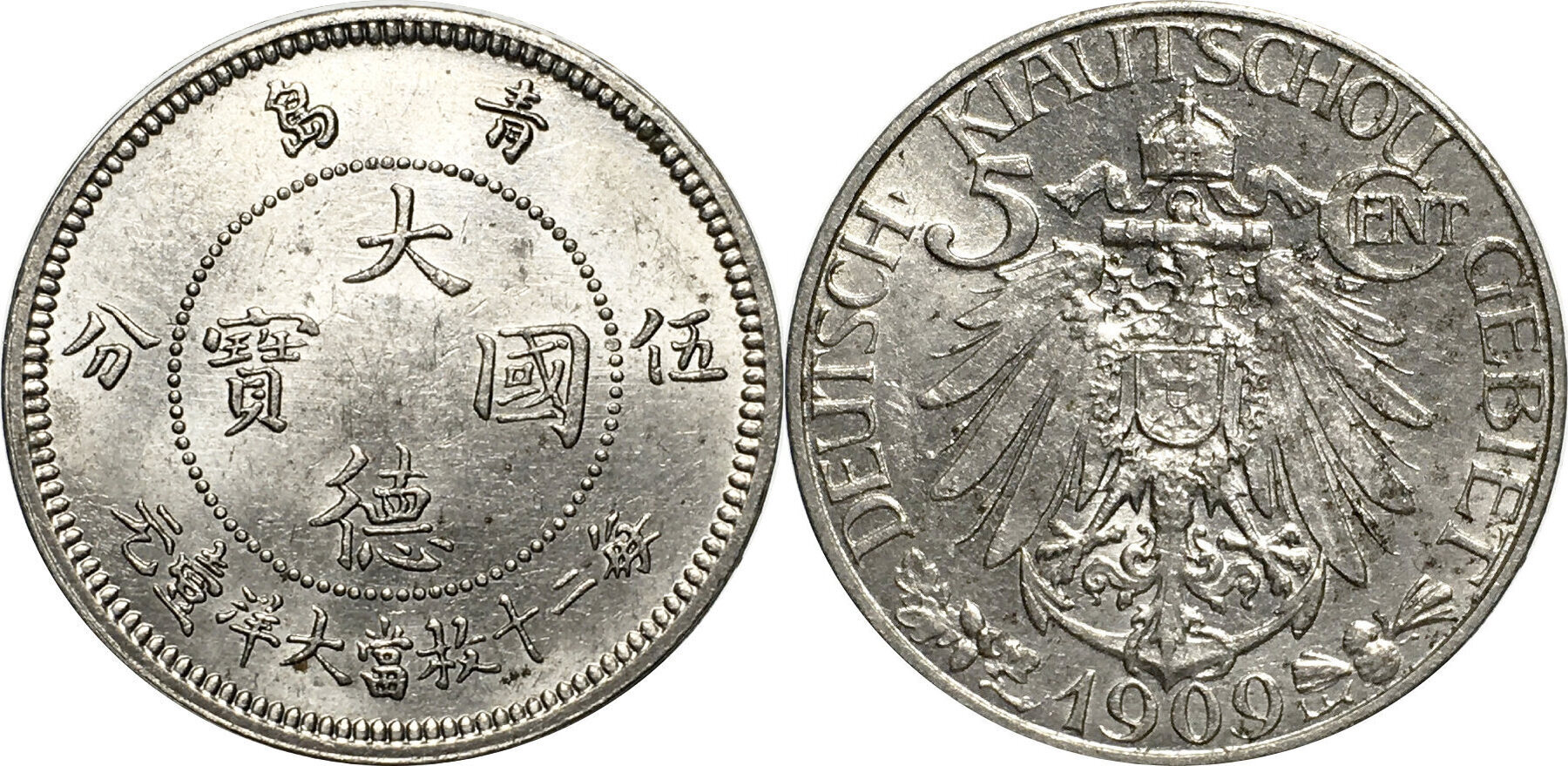
5¢ coin

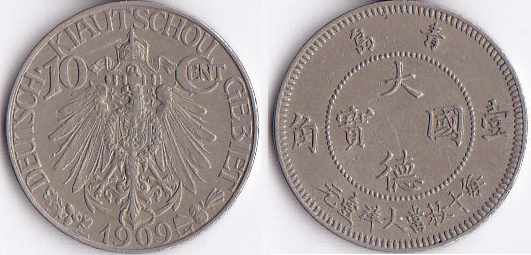
10¢ coin

== See also ==
- Jiaozhou Bay Leased Territory & German Qingdao
- German Colonial Empire
- Deutsch-Asiatische Bank
