= Kiautschou Bay Leased Territory =

German concession in China (1897–1914)

Coordinates: 36°13′N 120°23′E

Kiautschou Bay Leased Territory Deutsches Pachtgebiet Kiautschou
- Leased territory of Germany
- 1898–1914
- Flag Seal

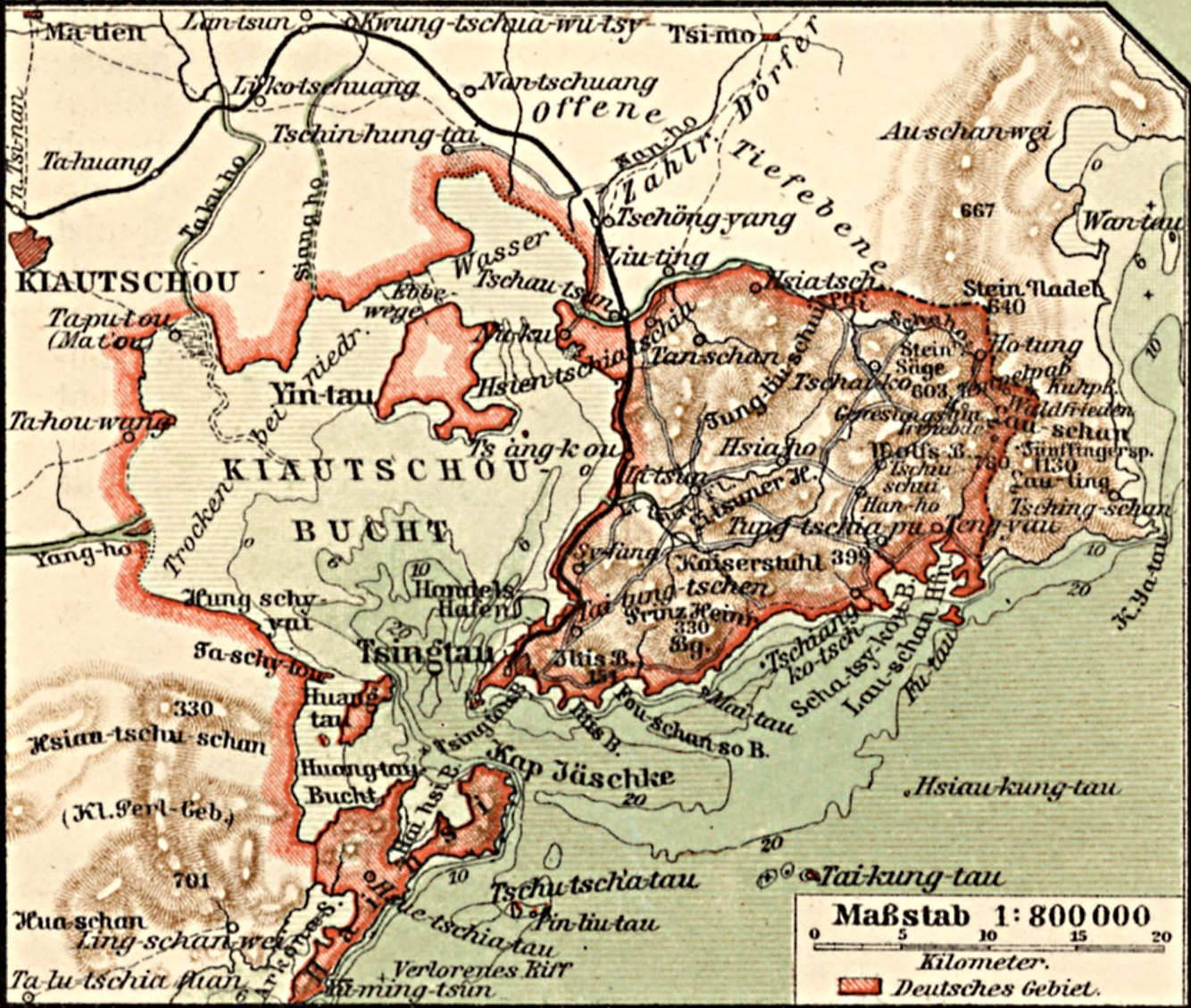
- Kiautschou Bay Leased Territory in dark green Neutral zone in striped light green

Anthem
- "Heil dir im Siegerkranz"
- Capital: Tsingtau
- Area
  - 1912: 552 km^{2} (213 sq mi)
- Population
  - 1912: 165,000 Chinese; 3,896 Europeans (3,806 German)
  - 1935: 209,000
- Government
- Governor
  - 1898–1899: Carl Rosendahl (first)
  - 1911–1914: Alfred Meyer-Waldeck (last)
- Historical era: Century of humiliation
  - Leased to Germany: 6 March 1898
  - Occupied by Japan: 7 November 1914
  - Ceded to the Republic of China: 10 December 1922
Preceded by	Succeeded by
Qing dynasty	Republic of China

Kiautschou Bay Leased Territory

Chinese name
- Traditional Chinese: 膠州灣租借地
- Simplified Chinese: 胶州湾租借地
- Postal: Kiaochow Bay
- Literal meaning: Jiaozhou Bay Leased Territory
Transcriptions
Standard Mandarin
- Hanyu Pinyin: Jiāozhōu Wān Zūjièdì
- Wade–Giles: Chiao-chou Wan Tzu-chieh-ti
Yue: Cantonese
- Jyutping: gaau^{1} zau^{1} waan^{1}

German name
- German: Deutsches Pachtgebiet Kiautschou

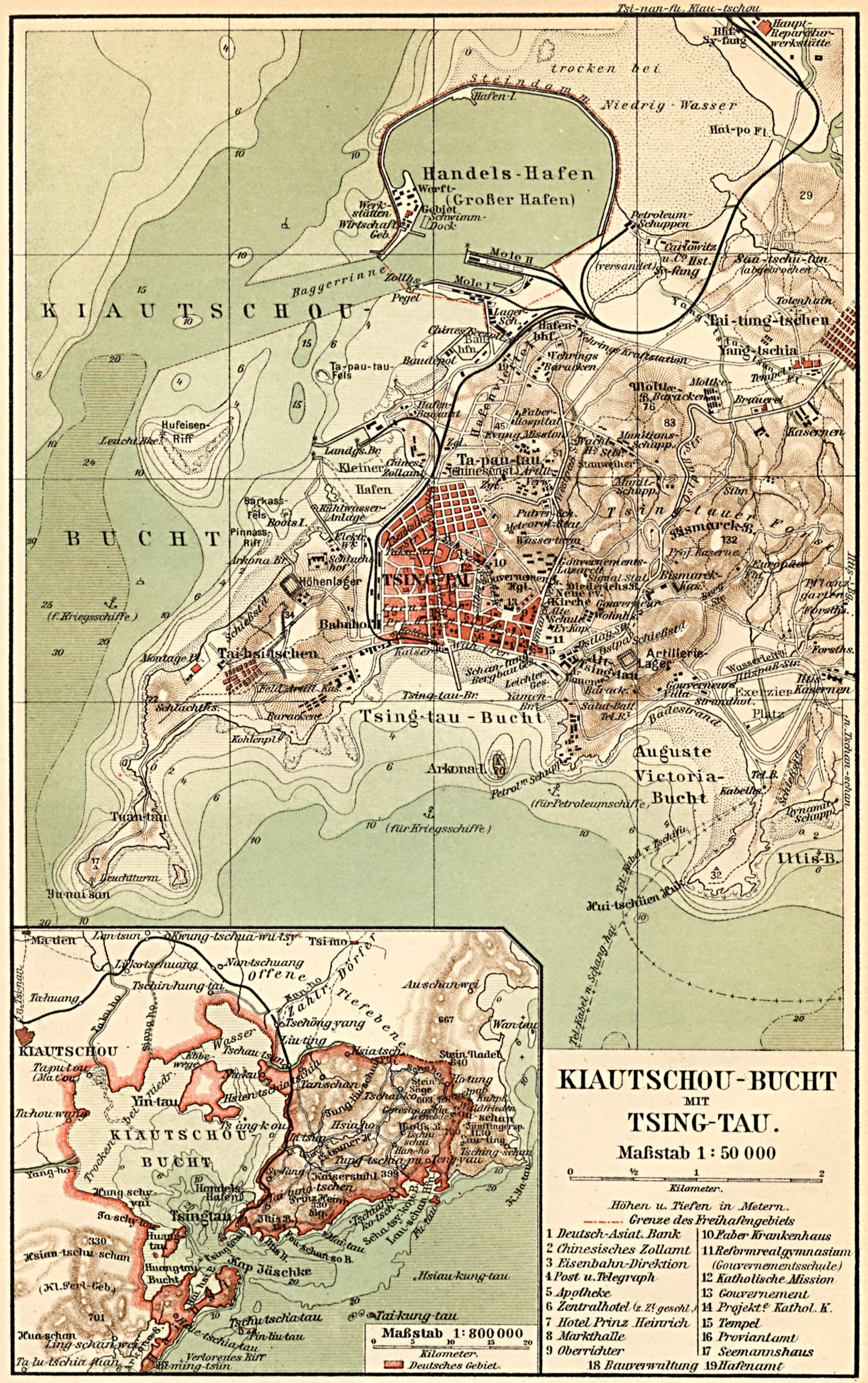
Map of Kiautschou Bay with Tsingtau, 1905

The Kiautschou Bay Leased Territory (German: Deutsches Pachtgebiet Kiautschou), also known as the Jiaozhou, Kiaochau, Kiaochow, Kiauchau, and Kiao-chau Bay Concession, was a German leased territory in Imperial and Early Republican China from 1898 to 1914. Covering an area of 552 km^{2} (213 sq mi), it centered on Jiaozhou Bay (Kiautschou-Bucht) on the southeastern coast of the Shandong Peninsula. The administrative center was at Qingdao (Tsingtau). It was operated by the East Asia Squadron of the Imperial German Navy. The Russian Empire resented the German move as an infringement on Russian ambitions in the region.

== Background of German expansion in China ==
Germany was a relative latecomer to the imperialistic scramble for colonies across the globe. A German colony in China was envisioned as a two-fold enterprise: as a coaling station to support a global naval presence, and because it was felt that a German colonial empire would support the economy in the mother country. Densely populated China was viewed as a potential market to be exploited, with thinkers such as Max Weber demanding an active colonial policy from the government. In particular, the opening of China was made a high priority, because it was thought to be the most important non-European market in the world.

However, a global policy (Weltpolitik) without global military influence appeared impracticable, so, assessing that Britain's great strength came from its navy, the Germans began to build one, too. This fleet was supposed to serve German interests during peace through gunboat diplomacy, and in times of war, through commerce raiding, to protect German trade routes and disrupt hostile ones. Imitating Britain, a network of global naval bases was a key requirement for this intention.

Again, intending to directly copy Britain, the acquisition of a harbor in China was, from the start, intended to be a model colony: all installations, the administration, the surrounding infrastructure, and the utilization thereof were to show the Chinese, the German nation itself, and other colonial powers, an effective colonial policy.

== German acquisition of the territory ==
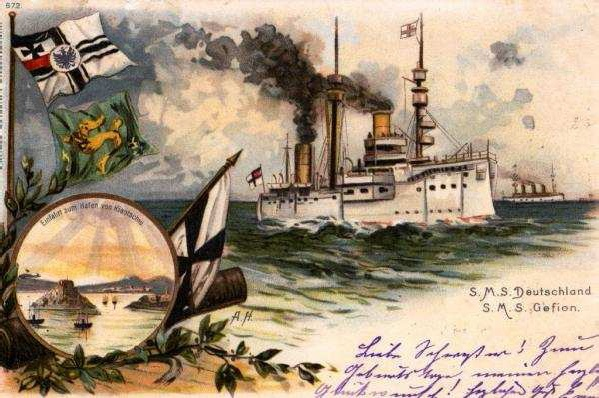
Postcard of Deutschland and Gefion arriving at Kiautschou Bay in 1899

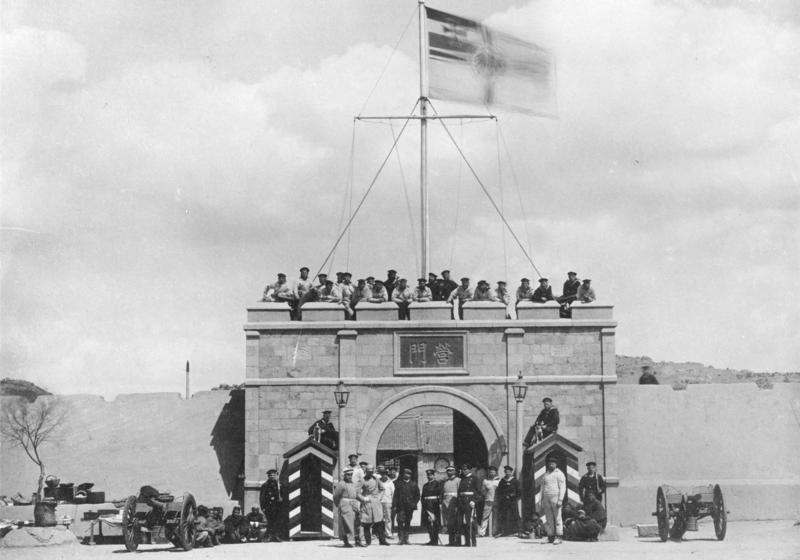
Main gate of a Chinese munitions depot, taken over by the Imperial German Navy, 1898

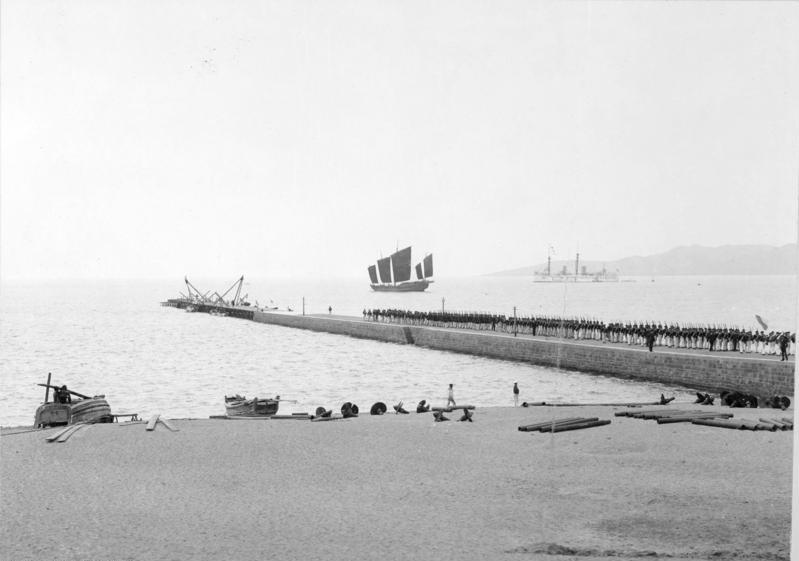
Pier with German naval personnel, apparent expansion in progress, 1898

In 1860, a Prussian expeditionary fleet arrived in Asia and explored the region around Jiaozhou Bay. The following year, the Prussian-Chinese Treaty of Peking was signed. (Note: Gottschall, By Order of the Kaiser, p. 134; the treaty, signed September 1861, allowed Prussian warships to operate in Chinese waters for the protection of German trade and missionaries and promised swift retribution for crimes committed against German nationals by Chinese perpetrators) After journeys to China between 1868 and 1871, the geographer Baron Ferdinand von Richthofen recommended the Bay of Jiaozhou as a possible naval base. In 1896, Rear Admiral Alfred von Tirpitz, at that time commander of the East Asian Cruiser Division, examined the area personally, as well as three additional sites in China, for the establishment of a naval base. Rear Admiral Otto von Diederichs replaced Tirpitz in East Asia and focused on Jiaozhou Bay, even though the Berlin admiralty had not formally decided on a base location.

On 1 November 1897, the Big Sword Society murdered two German Roman Catholic priests of the Steyler Mission in Juye County in southern Shandong. This event was known as the "Juye Incident". Admiral von Diederichs, commander of the cruiser squadron, wired on 7 November 1897, to the admiralty: "May incidents be exploited in pursuit of further goals?" Upon receipt of the Diederichs cable, Chancellor Chlodwig von Hohenlohe counseled caution, preferring a diplomatic resolution. However, Kaiser Wilhelm II intervened and the admiralty sent a message for Diederichs to "proceed immediately to Kiautschou [Jiaozhou] with entire squadron ..." to which the admiral replied, "will proceed ... with greatest energy."

Diederichs, at that moment, only had his division's flagship SMS Kaiser and the protected cruiser SMS Prinzess Wilhelm available at anchor in Shanghai. The corvette SMS Arcona was laid up for repairs and the protected cruiser SMS Irene in a dockyard at Hong Kong for an engine refit. The unprotected cruiser SMS Cormoran, operating independent of the cruiser division, was patrolling the Yangtze. Diederichs weighed anchor, ordered Prinzess Wilhelm to follow next day, and Cormoran to catch up at sea. The three ships arrived off Qingdao after dawn on 13 November 1897, but made no aggressive moves. With his staff and the three captains of his ships aboard, Diederichs landed with his admirals tender at Qingdao's long Zhanqiao Pier to reconnoiter. He determined that his landing force would be vastly outnumbered by Chinese troops, but he had qualitative superiority.

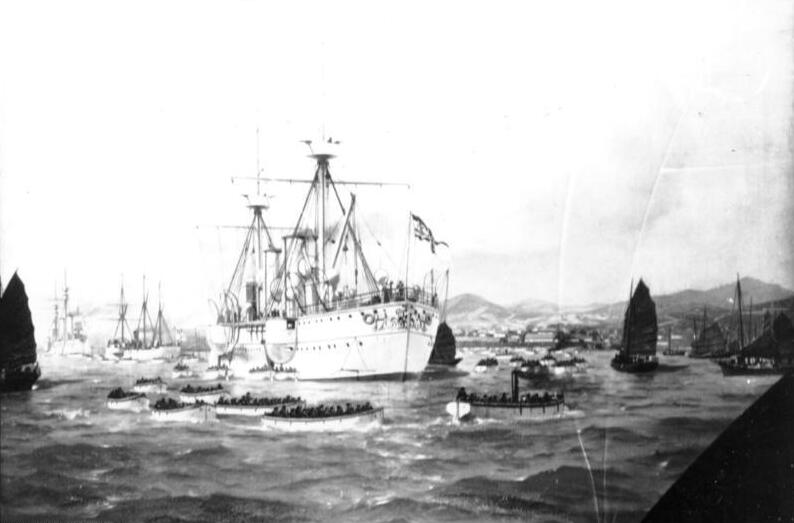
Disembarkation of the landing force

At 06:00, Sunday, 14 November 1897, Cormoran steamed into the inner harbor to provide inshore fire support, if necessary. Kaiser and Prinzess Wilhelm cleared boats to carry an amphibious force of 717 officers, petty officers, and sailors armed with rifles. (Note: After German unification, Prussian Army Lieutenant General Albrecht von Stosch was appointed in 1872 the first chief of the Imperial Admiralty. He had no naval experience but brought significant administrative talent to his post – and he understood the power that emanated from “the tip of an army bayonet”. Stosch removed the small contingents of marines from the warships and instead trained the seamen of cruisers in the use of small arms, infantry tactics and amphibious landings [Gottschall, p. 42].) Diederichs, on horseback, and his column marched toward the Chinese main garrison and artillery battery. A special unit swiftly disabled the Chinese telegraph line and others occupied the outer forts and powder magazines. With speed and effectiveness, Diederichs’ actions had achieved their primary objective by 08:15.

Signalmen restored the telegraph line, and the first messages were received and deciphered. Diederichs was stunned to learn that his orders had been canceled, and that he was to suspend operations at Jiaozhou pending negotiations with the Chinese government. If he had already occupied the village of Qingdao, he was to consider his presence temporary. He responded, thinking the politicians in Berlin had lost their nerve to political or diplomatic complications: "Proclamation already published. ... Revocation not possible." After considerable time and uncertainty, the admiralty finally cabled congratulations and the proclamation was to remain in effect; Wilhelm II promoted him to vice admiral.

Admiral von Diederichs consolidated his positions at Jiaozhou Bay. The admiralty dispatched the protected cruiser SMS Kaiserin Augusta from the Mediterranean to Qingdao to further strengthen the naval presence in East Asia. (Note: SMS Kaiserin Augusta became the flagship of a second cruiser division with SMS Deutschland and SMS Gefion and Cormoran; the two 4-ship divisions would form the 8-ship squadron.) On 26 January 1898, the marines of III. Seebataillon arrived on the liner Darmstadt. Jiaozhou Bay was now secure.

Negotiations with the Chinese government began and on 6 March 1898, the German Empire retreated from outright cession of the area and accepted a leasehold of the bay for 99 years, or until 1997, as the British were soon to do with Hong Kong's New Territories and the French with Guangzhouwan. One month later, the Reichstag ratified the treaty on 8 April 1898. Kiautschou Bay was officially placed under German protection by imperial decree on 27 April and Kapitän zur See [captain] Carl Rosendahl was appointed governor. These events ended Admiral von Diederichs' responsibility (but not his interest) in Kiautschou. He wrote that he had "fulfilled [his] purpose in the navy."

As a result of the lease treaty, the Chinese government gave up the exercise of its sovereign rights within the leased territory of approximately 83,000 inhabitants (to which the city of Kiautschou was excluded), as well as in a 50 km wide neutral zone ("neutrales Gebiet"). According to international law, the leased territory ("territoire à bail") remained legally part of China but for the duration of the lease, all sovereign powers were to be exercised by Germany.

Moreover, the treaty included rights for construction of railway lines and mining of local coal deposits. Many parts of Shandong outside of the German leased territory came under German economic influence. Although the lease treaty set limits to the German expansion, it became a starting point for the following cessions of Port Arthur and Dalian to Russia to support Russia's Chinese Eastern Railway interests in Manchuria, of the transfer of Weihaiwei and Liugong Island from Japan to Great Britain, and the cession of Guangzhouwan to support France in southern China and Indochina.

=== Later history ===
On 15 August 1914, at the outbreak of World War I in Europe, Japan delivered an ultimatum to Germany demanding that it relinquish its control of the disputed territory of Kiautschou. Upon rejection of the ultimatum, Japan declared war on 23 August and the same day, its navy bombarded the German territory. On 7 November 1914, the bay was occupied by Japanese forces. Following the resolution of the Shandong Problem, the occupied territory was returned to China on 10 December 1922, but the Japanese again occupied the area from 1937 to 1945, during the Second Sino-Japanese War.

== Language ==
The local language was the Qingdao dialect of Jiaoliao Mandarin. A German pidgin, known as Kiautschou German pidgin, developed as well, as a mixture of High German, Middle German, Low German, English and Chinese.

== Organization and development of the territory ==
As the territory was not, strictly speaking, a colony but a lease, and because of its importance to the German navy, it was not placed under the supervision of the Imperial Colonial Office (Reichskolonialamt) but instead under that of the Imperial Naval Office (the Reichsmarineamt or RMA).

Civilian administration flag of Kiautschou

At the top of the territory stood the governor (all five office holders were senior navy officers), who was directly subordinated to the secretary of state of the RMA, Alfred von Tirpitz. The governor was head of both the military administration (run by the chief of staff and deputy governor), and the civil administration (managed by the Zivilkommissar). Further important functionaries of Kiautschou were the official for the construction of the harbor, and after 1900, the chief justice and the Commissioner for Chinese Affairs. The Gouvernementsrat [government council of the territory] and, after 1902, the Chinese Committee advised the governor. The departments of finance, construction, education, and medical services were directly subordinated to the governor, because these were crucial with regard to the idea of a model colony.

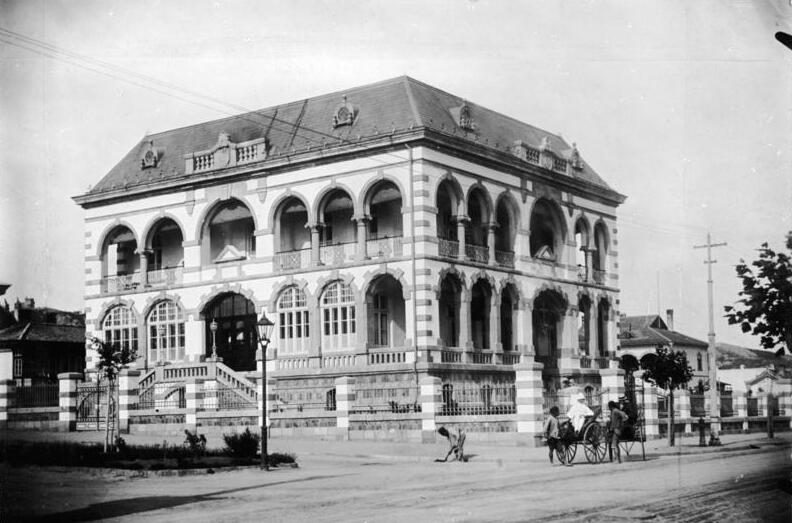
The branch office of the Deutsch-Asiatische Bank in Tsingtau

Germany invested upwards of $100 million in modernizing the territory of Kiautschou. The impoverished fishing village of Tsingtau was laid out with wide streets, solid housing areas, government buildings, electrification throughout, a sewer system, and a safe drinking water supply, a rarity in large parts of Asia at that time and later. The area had the highest density of schools and highest per capita student enrollment in all of China, with primary, secondary, and vocational schools funded by the Berlin treasury and Protestant and Roman Catholic missions.

With the expansion of economic activity and public works, German banks opened branch offices, the Deutsch-Asiatische Bank being the most prominent. The completion of the Tsingtau-Jinan railway in 1910 provided a connection to the Trans-Siberian Railway and thus allowed travel by train from Tsingtau to Berlin.

The territory fully implemented Georgist policy. Its sole source of government revenue was the land value tax of six percent which it levied in its territory. The German colonial empire previously had economic problems with its African colonies caused by land speculation. One of the main reasons for using the land value tax in Jiaozhou Bay was to eliminate such speculation, which the policy achieved.

After the 1911 Revolution, many wealthy Chinese and politically connected ex-officials settled in the leased territory because of the safe and orderly environment it offered. Sun Yat-sen visited the Tsingtau area and stated in 1912, “... I am impressed. The city is a true model for China’s future.”

== Currency ==
The Deutsch-Asiatische Bank in Qingdao issued its own dollar banknotes and cent coins, pegged to the value of the Spanish and Mexican silver dollar. The notes were printed in German, English, and Chinese and the coins inscribed in German and Chinese. The territory also conducted trade based on the Jiaozhou tael, pegged at a slight discount to the haiguan tael used by the Imperial Maritime Customs.

== Governors ==
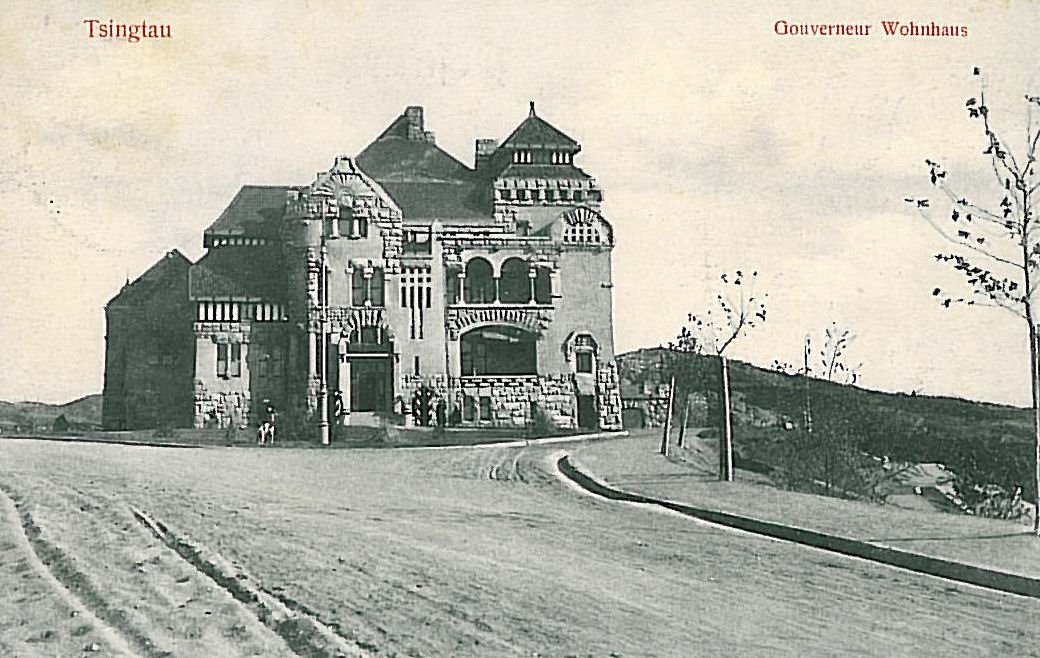
The residence of the governor in Tsingtau, now the Qingdao Yingbinguan Museum

All governors of the Kiautschou Bay Leased Territory were high-ranking officers of the Imperial German Navy.

No.	Portrait	Name (Birth–Death)	Term of office		
No.	Portrait	Name (Birth–Death)	Took office	Left office	Time in office
Militärgouverneur (Military Governor)
1		Otto von Diederichs (1843–1918)	14 November 1897	7 March 1898	113 days
Gouverneur (Governor)
2		Carl Rosendahl (1852–1917)	7 March 1898	19 February 1899	287 days
3		Paul Jaeschke (1851–1901)	19 February 1899	27 January 1901 †	1 year, 342 days
–		Max Rollmann (1857–1942); Acting	27 January 1901	8 June 1901	132 days
4		Oskar von Truppel (1854–1931)	8 June 1901	19 August 1911	10 years, 72 days
–		Wilhelm Höpfner (1868–1951); Acting (Note: Served in acting capacity between departure of Truppel and arrival of Meyer-Waldeck.)	14 May 1911	22 November 1911	192 days
5		Alfred Meyer-Waldeck (1864–1928)	19 August 1911	7 November 1914	3 years, 80 days

== See also ==
- China–Germany relations
- German colonial empire
- Chinese people in Germany
- Eulenburg expedition
- Former Kiautschou Imperial Post Office, located in Qingdao
- Kiautschou Governor's Hall, located in Qingdao
- Tsingtao Brewery, Germany's enduring legacy to Chinese brewing
- Tsingtauer Neueste Nachrichten
- Kiautschou, card game named after the territory

== Bibliography ==
- Ganz, Albert Harding (1977). "The German Navy in the Far East and Pacific: The Seizure of Kiautschou and After". In Moses, John Anthony; Kennedy, Paul M. (eds.). Germany in the Pacific and Far East, 1870-1914. St. Lucia: University of Queensland Press. pp. 115–136. ISBN 978-0-7022-1330-4.
- Gottschall, Terrell D. (2003). By order of the Kaiser: Otto von Diederichs and the rise of the Imperial German Navy, 1865-1902. Annapolis, Md: Naval Institute Press. ISBN 978-1-55750-309-1.
- Schrecker, John E. (1971). Imperialism and Chinese nationalism: Germany in Shantung. Harvard East Asian series. Cambridge, Mass: Harvard University Press. ISBN 978-0-674-44520-8. OL 5446553M.
- Schrecker, John E. (1977). "Kiautschou and the problems of German colonialism". In Moses, John Anthony; Kennedy, Paul M. (eds.). Germany in the Pacific and Far East, 1870-1914. St. Lucia: University of Queensland Press. pp. 185–208. ISBN 978-0-7022-1330-4.
- Steinmetz, George (2007). The devil's handwriting: precoloniality and the German colonial state in Qingdao, Samoa, and Southwest Africa. Chicago studies in practices of meaning. Chicago: University of Chicago Press. ISBN 978-0-226-77241-7.
- Stephenson, Charles (2009). Germany's Asia-Pacific Empire: colonialism and naval policy, 1885-1914. Woodbridge: The Boydell Press. ISBN 978-1-84383-518-9.
- Scott-Keltie, John; Epstein, Mortimer, eds. (1913). Statesman's year-book. Basingstoke: Palgrave Macmillan. OCLC 609408094.

=== In German ===
- Schultz-Naumann, Joachim (1985). Unter Kaisers Flagge: Deutschlands Schutzgebiete im Pazifik und in China einst und heute [Under the Kaiser's Flag, Germany's Protectorates in the Pacific and in China then and today] (in German). München: Universitas. ISBN 978-3-8004-1094-1. LCCN 96121365. OCLC 14130501.
