= Deutsch-Asiatische Bank =

German bank in China

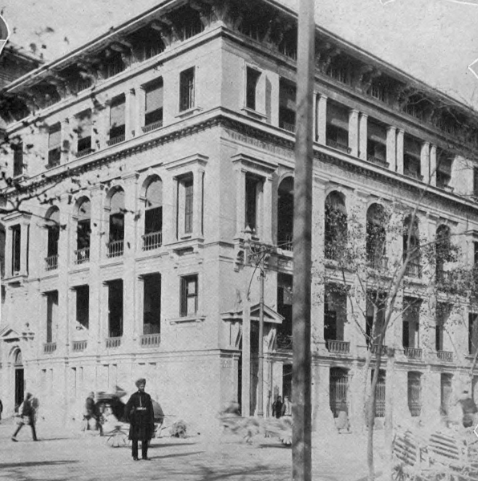
Building at No. 14 Bund in Shanghai, head office of Deutsch-Asiatische Bank from 1890 to 1917

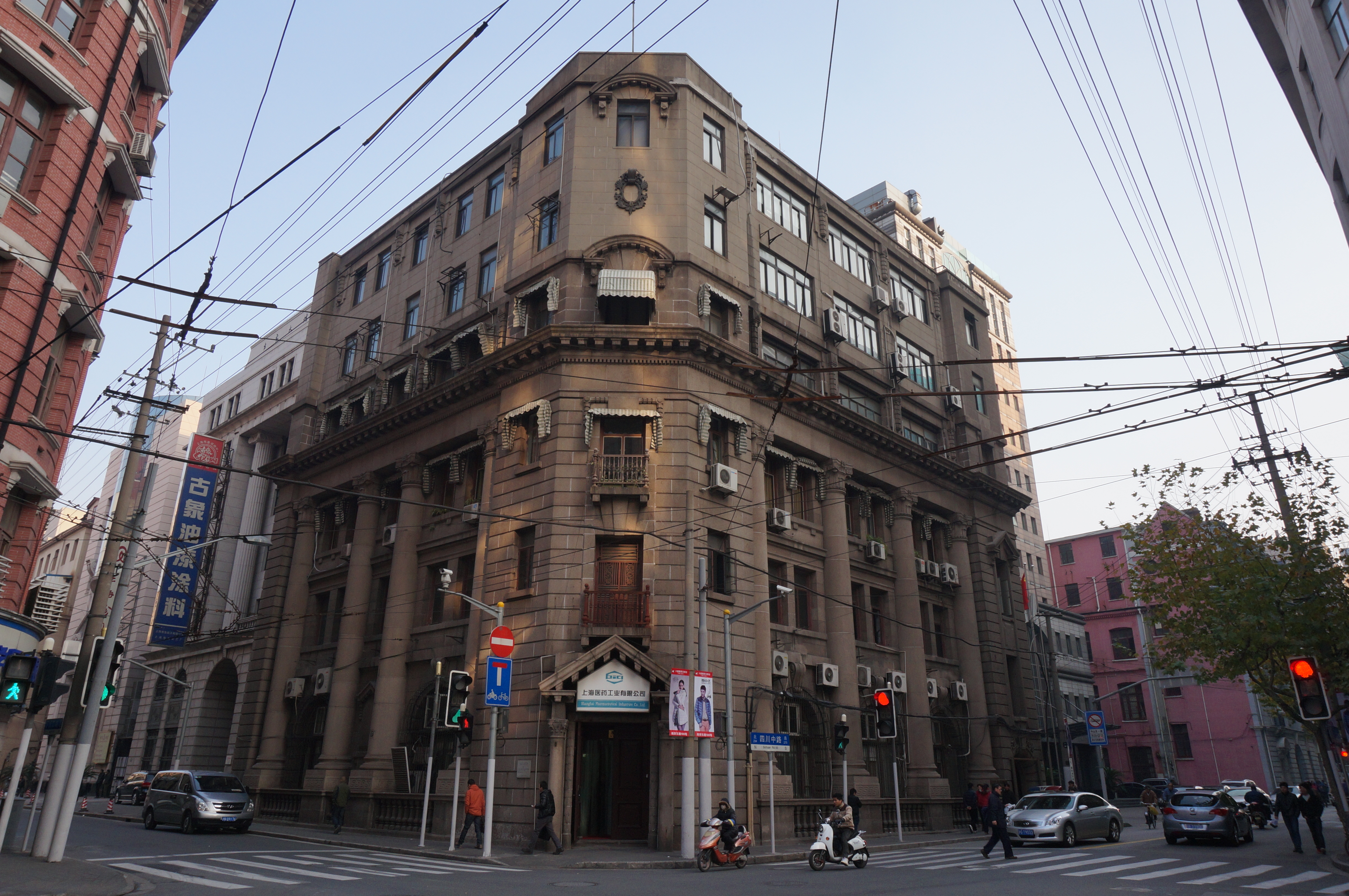
Shanghai head office during the interwar period, corner of Sichuan and Jiujiang roads, photographed in 2013

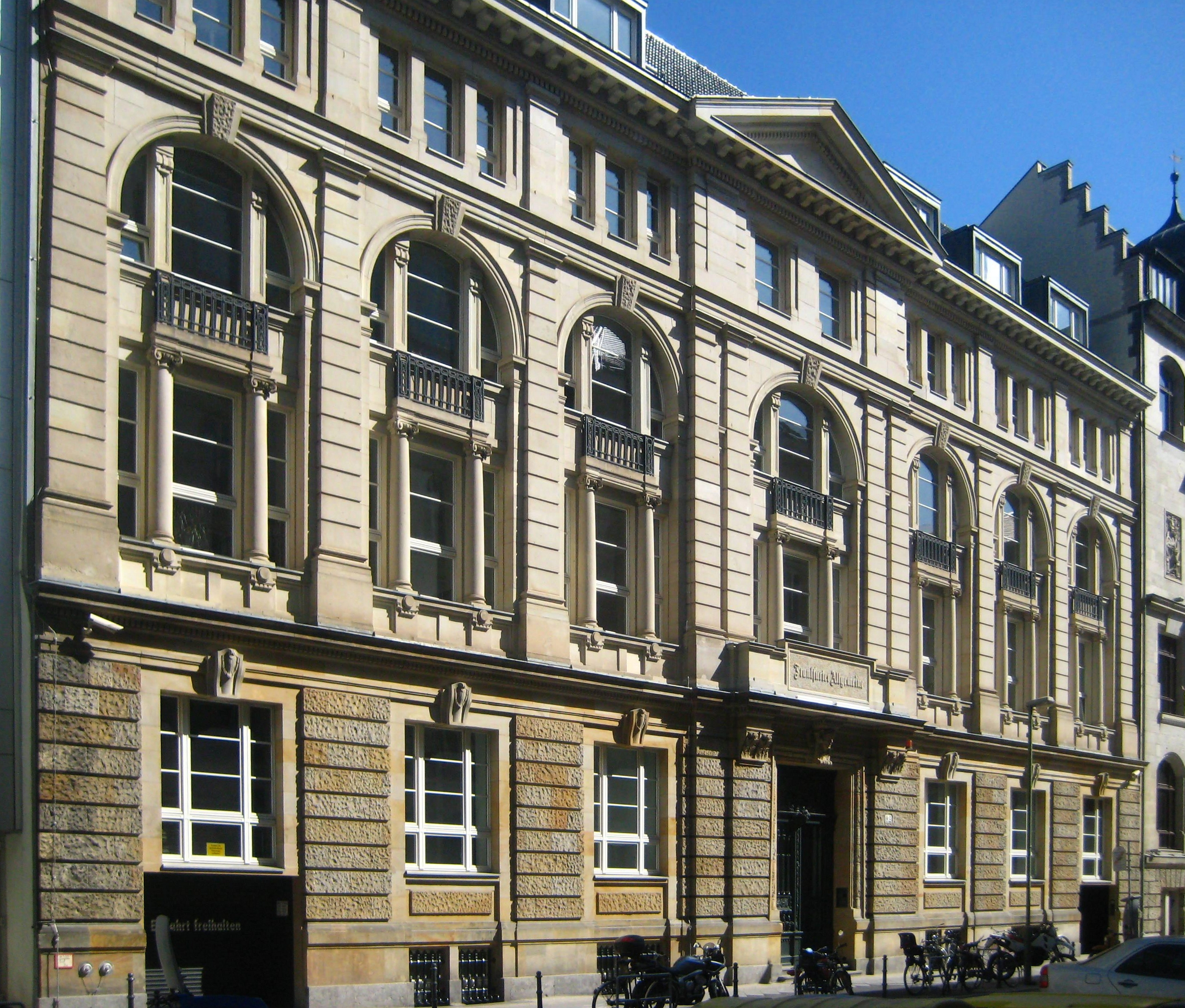
Mittelstrasse 2-4 in Berlin, the bank's Berlin office in the interwar period

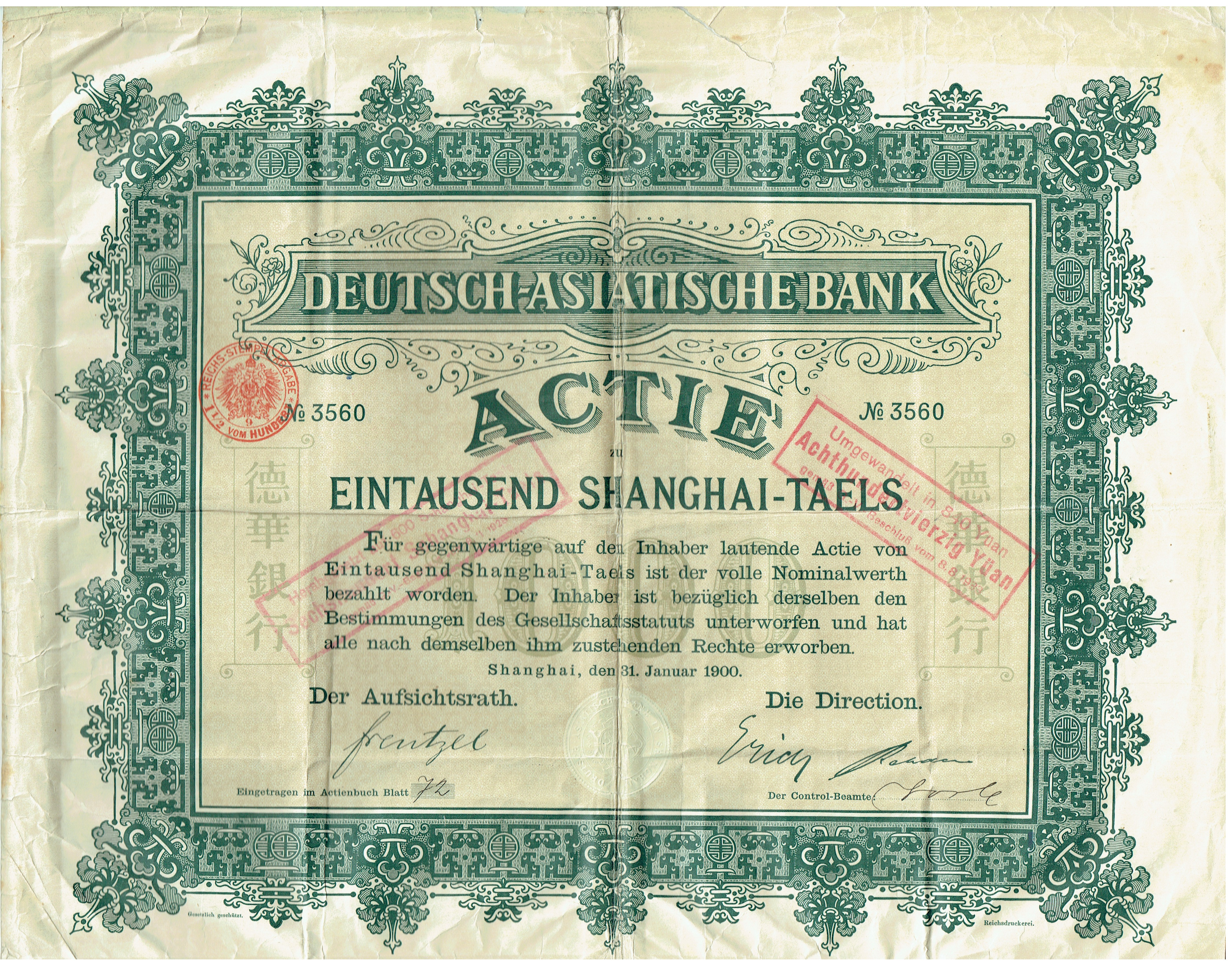
Share of the Deutsch-Asiatische Bank, issued 31 January 1900

The Deutsch-Asiatische Bank (DAB; simplified Chinese: 德华银行; traditional Chinese: 德華銀行; pinyin: Déhuá Yínháng) was a foreign bank in Asia, founded in 1889 in Shanghai. Even though its owners were private-sector banks and its principal activity was trade financing, its role has been described as "quasi-governmental" in the service of the German Empire's influence strategies in East Asia. Together with English and French banks, it also played a role in the underwriting of bonds for the Chinese government, issuing the Kiautschou Dollar and financing of railway construction in China.

== History ==
The Deutsch-Asiatische Bank was founded in the Shanghai International Settlement on 12 February 1889, at the initial initiative of the Disconto-Gesellschaft, and with the additional participation of all the other major German commercial banks of the time. Its initial capital, denominated in local taels, was divided between the Disconto-Gesellschaft (16.1 percent), Deutsche Bank (11.1 percent), S. Bleichröder (11.1 percent), Berliner Handels-Gesellschaft (9.4 percent), Jacob S.H. Stern (9.4 percent), Norddeutsche Bank (7.6 percent), Darmstädter Bank (6.2 percent), Mendelssohn & Co. (6.2 percent), M. A. Rothschild & Söhne (6.2 percent), as well as Dresdner Bank, A. Schaaffhausen'scher Bankverein, and Nationalbank für Deutschland among others. At the time, it was the first large non-British bank to enter the Chinese market. Its general management (German: Vorstand) resided in Shanghai, while the supervisory board (German: Aufsichtsrat) met in Berlin.

The bank soon set up branches in Tianjin (1890), Calcutta (1896), Hankou (1897), Qingdao (1897), Hong Kong (1899), Yokohama (1905), Beijing (1905), Kobe (1906), Singapore (1906), Jinan (1910), and Guangzhou (1910). Until World War I, it developed a cooperative relationship with the Hong Kong and Shanghai Banking Corporation (HSBC) against encroachments by competing foreign banks from France, Japan and Russia.

In 1906, the bank received the concession to issue its own banknotes in China, denominated in Mexican dollars and in taels.

In 1914 at the start of World War I, the DAB's operations in Calcutta, Hong Kong and Singapore were promptly closed and liquidated by the British authorities. In Japan, the operations in Kobe and Yokohama came to a standstill in September 1916. The branch in Qingdao was plundered by the victorious Japanese army following the siege of the city in 1914, and was subsequently used to host the Japanese Consulate there until World War II. The rest of the DAB's Chinese network was closed by the Chinese government following China's entry into the war on 14 August 1917. in early 1919, the branch in Shanghai was liquidated, with its prestige main building taken over by the Bank of Communications; the DAB only kept branches in Beijing and Hankou from its previous Chinese network.

The DAB's operations in Japan restarted in 1919, but the Yokohama branch was destroyed in the 1923 Great Kantō earthquake. Following the normalization of relationships between China and Germany in the early 1920s, the DAB was able to restart activity in Beijing, Guangzhou, Hankou, Shanghai, and Tianjin, as well as the continued operations in Japan.

The Deutsch-Asiatische Bank's activity in Berlin was terminated in 1945 by order of the Soviet occupation forces in Germany. On 27 September 1945, the government of the Republic of China similarly took over the head office in Shanghai and confiscated the bank's Chinese assets without compensation. The branch in Hamburg, however, could continue some activity after only a few days' interruption in May 1945, even though it had no access to the main offices' documentation. The bank's total headcount in Germany and China correspondingly evolved, from 85 in 1939 to 8 in January 1949 and 21 at end-1952. the bank's head office was formally relocated from Shanghai to Hamburg in June 1953. in 1963, the DAB absorbed the residual operations of Deutsche Bank für Ostasien, a specialized institution created during World War II to facilitate German-Japanese trade and whose branch in Tokyo had been liquidated by the allied occupation authorities in October 1945.

In 1972, together with partner banks within the EBIC group (European Banks' International Company), Deutsche Bank subsequently founded Europäisch-Asiatische Bank (also known as European Asian Bank or Eurasbank), which the former Deutsch-Asiatische Bank was merged into. Beside Deutsche Bank, the shareholder banks included AMRO Bank (Netherlands), Banca Commerciale Italiana (Italy), Creditanstalt-Bankverein (Austria), Midland Bank (UK), Société Générale de Banque (Belgium), and Société Générale (France). In 1986, the bank was renamed Deutsche Bank (Asia) after the partner banks sold their participations to Deutsche Bank. Between 1987 and 1988, it was then merged into Deutsche Bank.

== Buildings ==
The Deutsch-Asiatische Bank's branch in Shanghai opened at No. 14 Bund on 2 January 1890. After World War I, the property was taken over by China's Bank of Communications, which in the 1940s replaced it with the still-standing Bank of Communications Building.

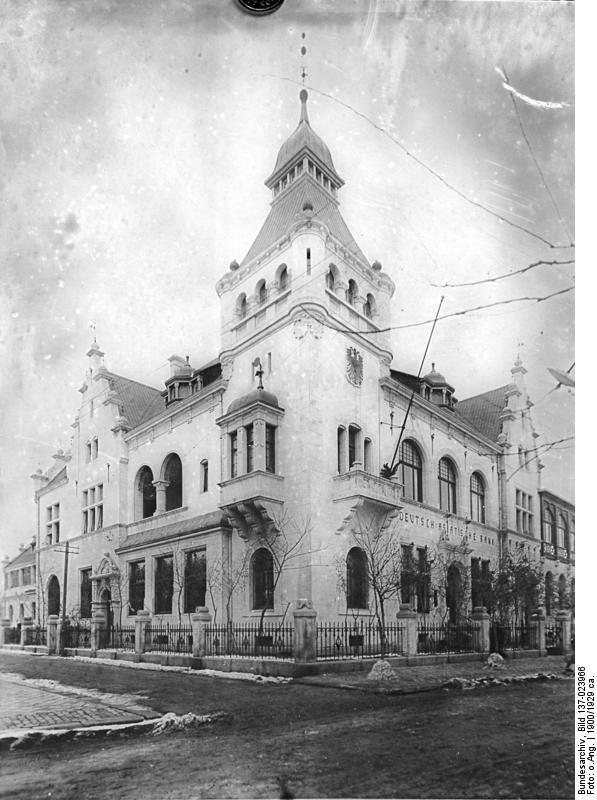
Branch building in the Beijing Legation Quarter, 1900

Branch building in Qingdao, 1901

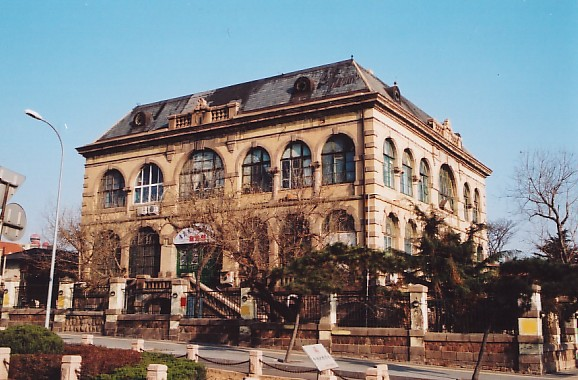
The same building in the early 2000s

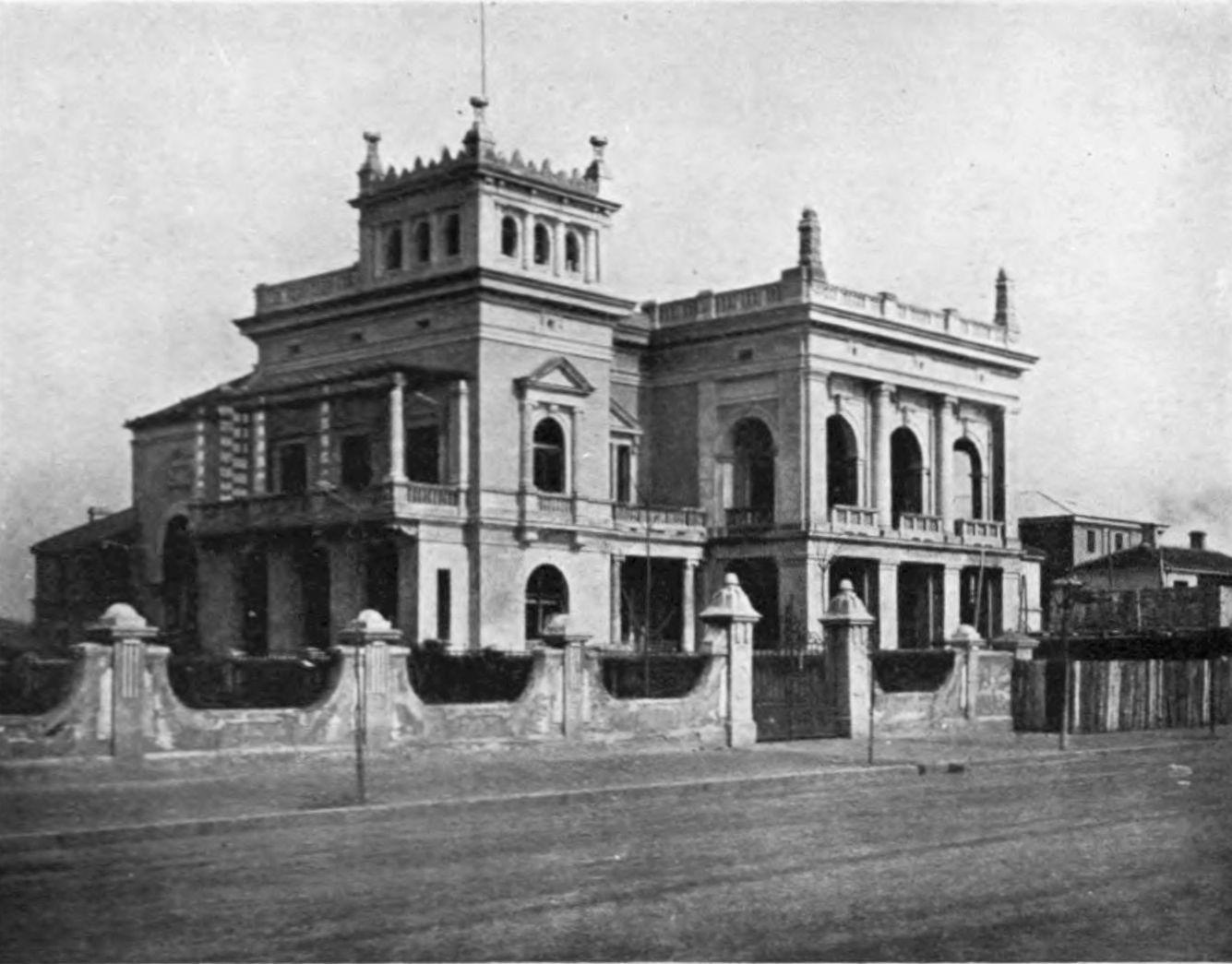
Branch building in Hankou, 1908

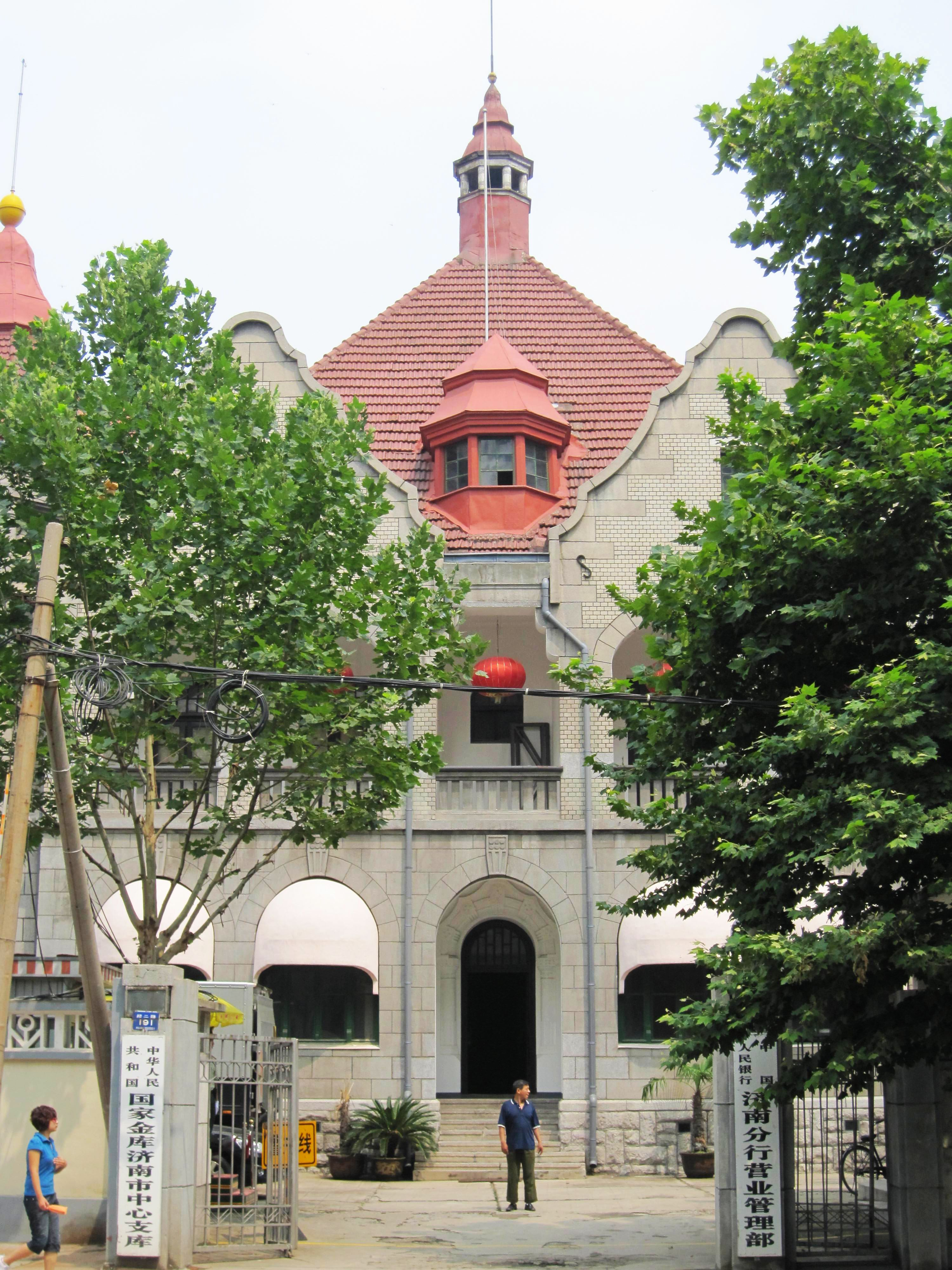
Former branch building in Jinan, 2009

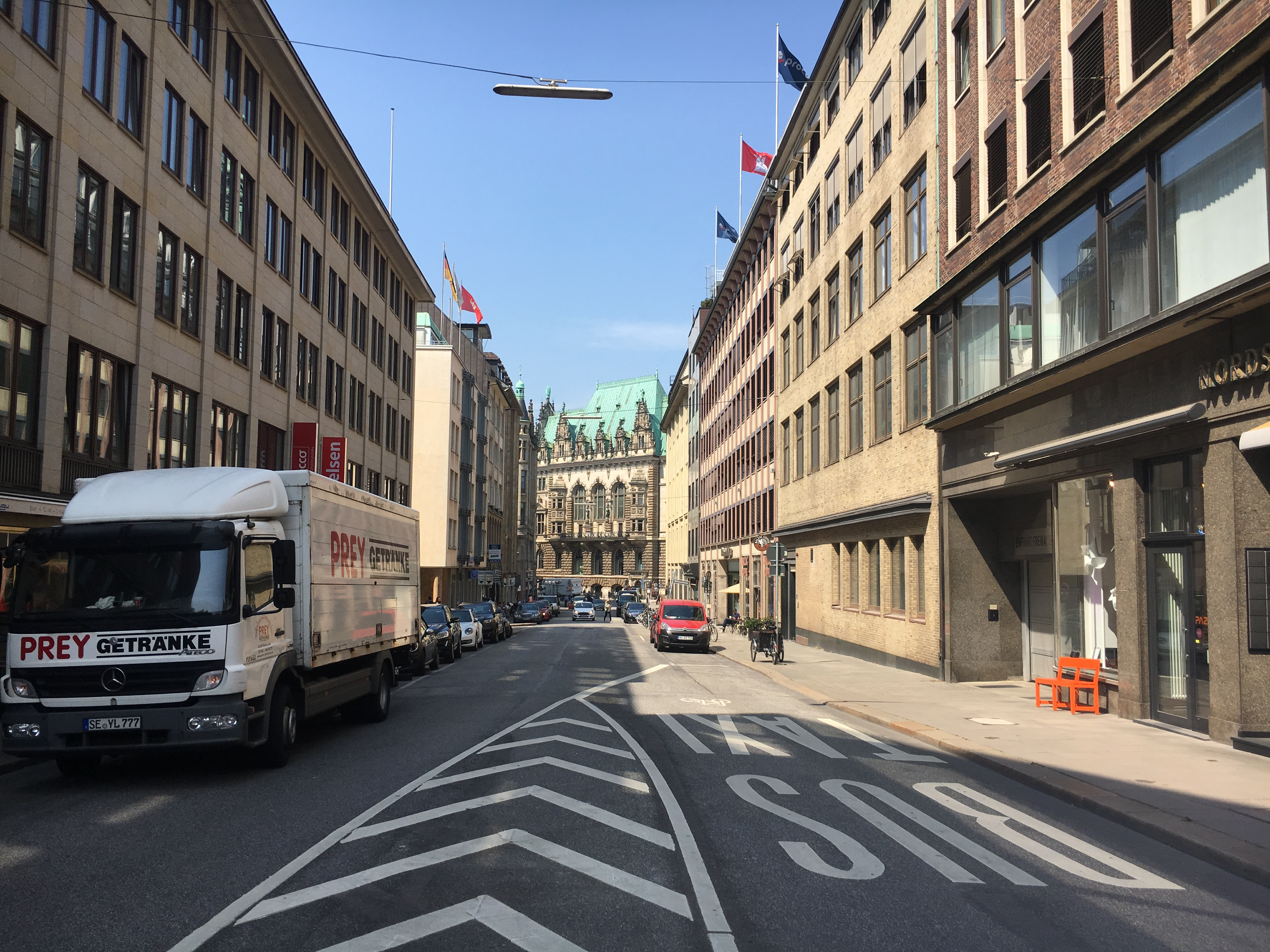
Building at Rathausstrasse 7 in Hamburg (right, with flags above), the bank's head office from the early 1960s

== Banknotes ==
Like other foreign banks in China at the time, the Deutsch-Asiatische Bank issued paper currency in the concessions where it had established branch offices.

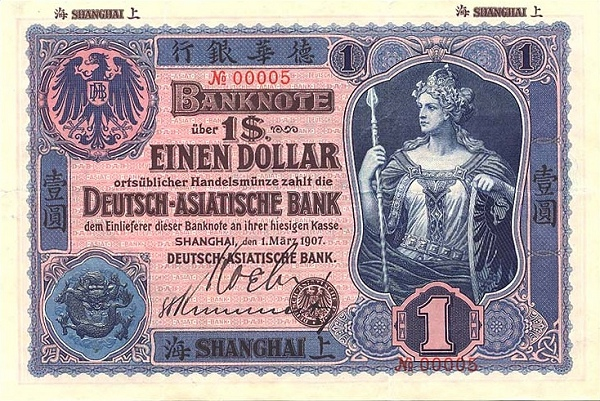
1 dollar local currency, Shanghai (1907)

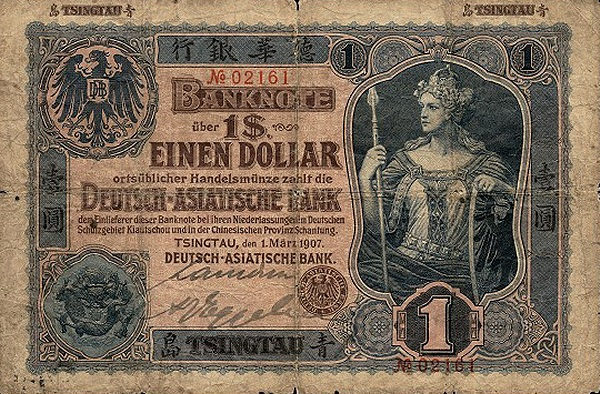
1 dollar local currency, Qingdao (1907)

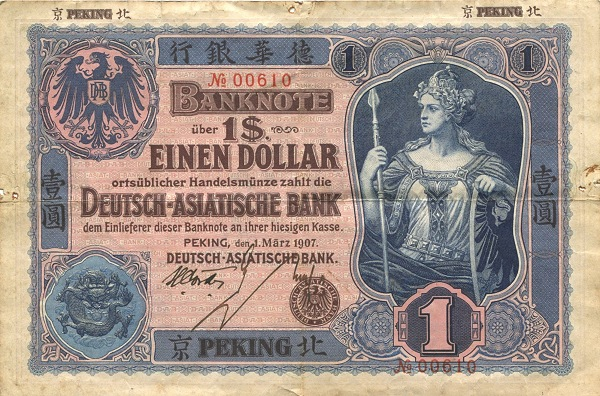
1 dollar local currency, Beijing (1907)

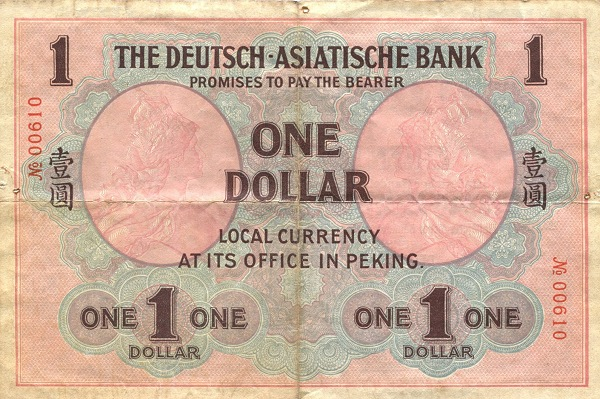
1 dollar local currency, Beijing (1907)

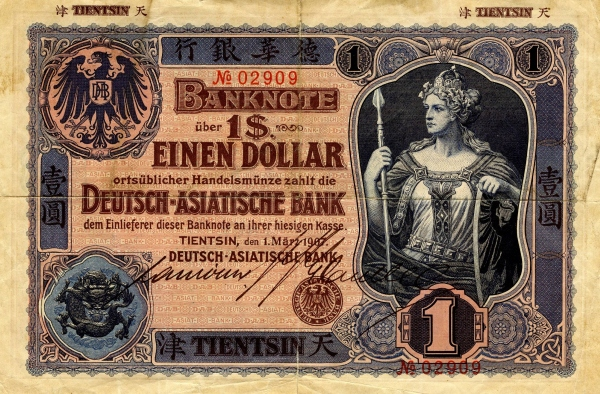
1 dollar local currency, Tianjin (1907)

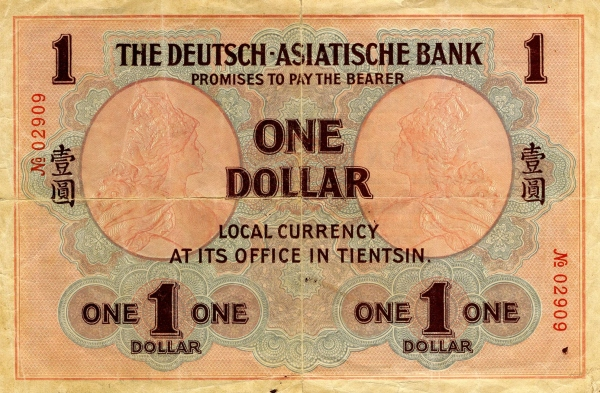
1 dollar local currency, Tianjin (1907)

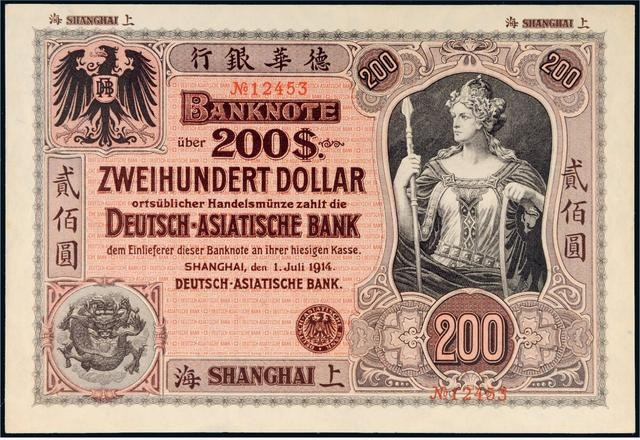
200 dollars local currency, Shanghai (1914)

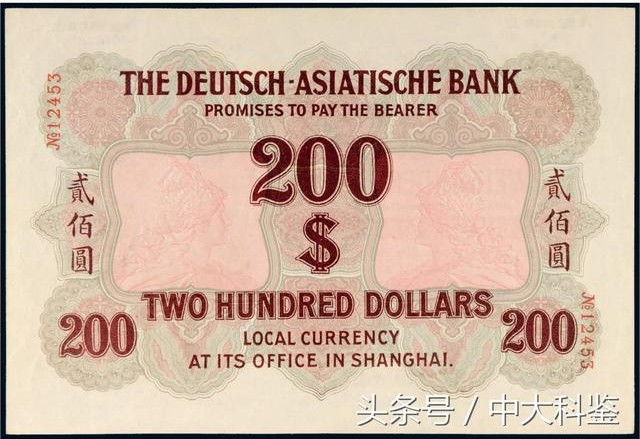
200 dollars local currency, Shanghai (1914)

== See also ==
- Banque de l'Indochine
- Yokohama Specie Bank
- Russo-Chinese Bank
- Banque Franco-Japonaise
- Banque Industrielle de Chine
- China Consortium
