= Kiautschou German pidgin =

Extinct pidgin spoken by German-educated Chinese

Kiautschou Pidgin German
- Native to: China
- Region: Kiautschou Bay Leased Territory
- Era: early 20th century
- Language family: German-based pidgin

Language codes
- ISO 639-3: None (mis)
- Glottolog: kiau1234 Kiautschou Pidgin German

The Kiautschou German pidgin is a minor extinct pidgin spoken by German-educated Chinese in the Kiautschou Bay concession.

== Background ==
There are records of some sort of a German pidgin developing since 1898. However, despite the high number of Germans within the concession, due to trade reasons, many preferred to use English instead. Thus, vigorous promotion of education of the German language commenced, and a slow transition from English to German began in the concession.

== Sample sentences ==
The German pidgin never fully developed on its own, instead branching off of the pre-existing English pidgin. Though not extensively recorded, it can be inferred many different local variations exist.

The following are samples of the pidgin:

Kiautschou German pidgin	German	English
Ik sabe deutsch, Gobenol at gebene pamischu open Otel, kommen Sie, luksi, no hebe pisi man, no habe dima, bei an bei.	Ich kann Deutsch, der Gouverneur hat mir Erlaubnis gegeben, ein Hotel zu eröffnen, kommen Sie, besehen Sie es; Ich habe noch keinen Gast, weil ich keine Zimmer habe, aber nach und nach.	I can speak German, the governor gave me permission to open a hotel, come see it; I have not yet a guest because I don't have rooms, but little by little.
Deutschland master in schipp make make bumm bam fisst.	Die deutschen Meister (in ihren) Schiffe machen viel Lärm.	The German masters (in their) ships make a lot of noise.
Esselenzy nich wollen nehl Schampin, chinaboi gehen flotti.	Exzellenz wollen keinen Champagner mehr, der chinesische Diener wird fortgehen.	Your Excellency doesn't want any more champagne, (thus) the Chinese servant will go away.
Bei gestern abend schamte ich auf der Strasse gegenueber ihre Veranda nach Sie zu schauen da viele Leute mehr fuerchte ich sie mich verspoten.	Letzte Nacht habe ich mich geschämt, von der Straße gegenüber Ihrer Veranda nach Ihnen zu sehen, es waren viele Leute da und ich hatte Angst, sie würden mich verspotten.	Last night I was ashamed to watch you from the street opposite your veranda, there were many people and I was afraid they would ridicule me.
