= Bank of Communications Building =

Coordinates: 31.24°N 121.49°E

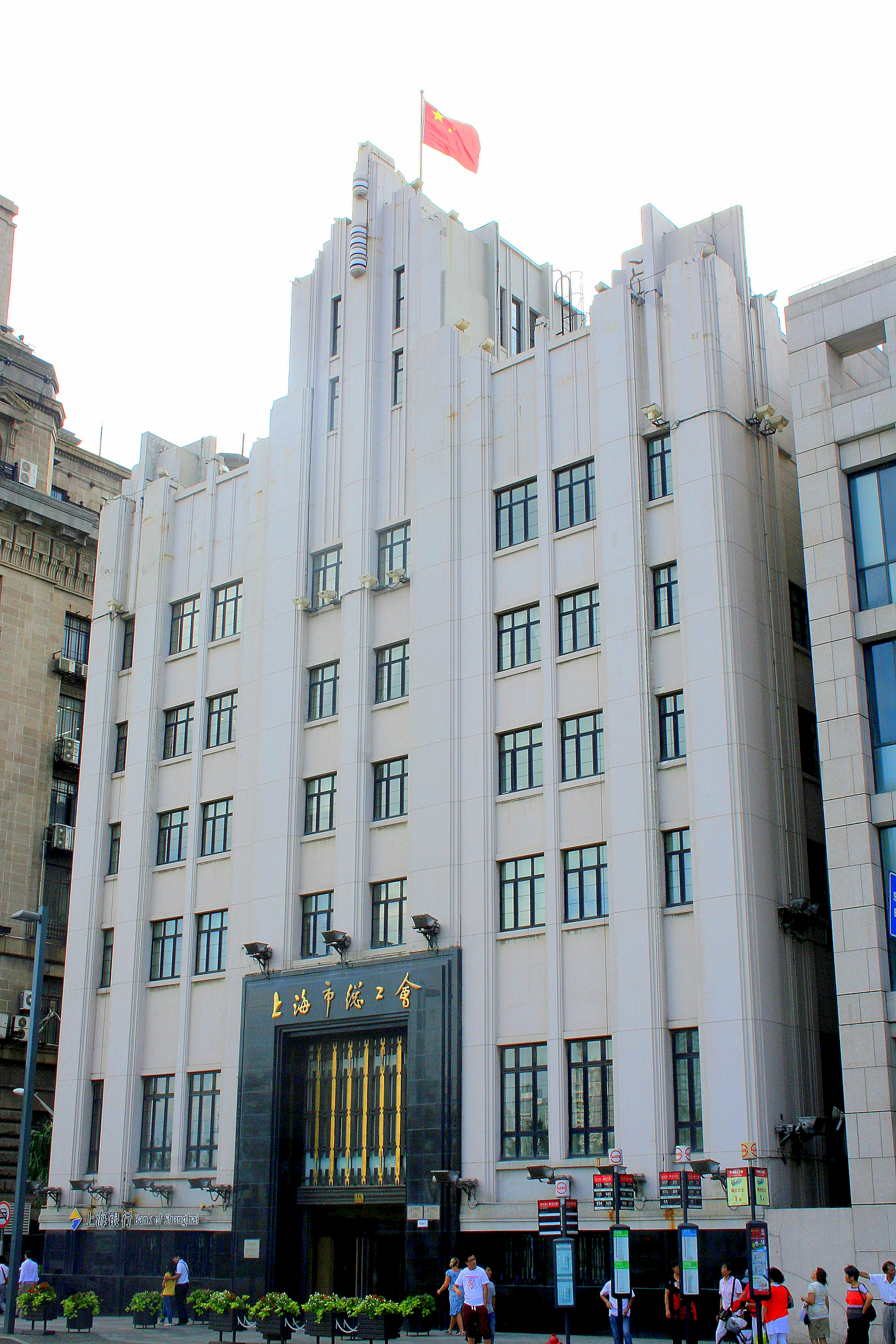
The China Bank of Communications Building was the last building completed on the Bund before the founding of the People's Republic.

The Bank of Communications Building is located at No. 14 on the Bund, Shanghai. The building was designed in a modern Art-Deco style, combined with Chinese elements, by Hungarian architect C. H. Gonda. It is an eight-story concrete-frame structure, framed by black marble around the doors. The building is now occupied by the offices of the Shanghai Federation of Trade Unions.

== History ==
The first European buildings on the site were constructed in 1880, after several German banks joined with a local Chinese businessman to form the Deutsch-Asiatische Bank. The bank then constructed four smaller buildings on the current site. During World War I, both China and Japan declared war on Germany, and the bank lost its holdings in China. In 1919 the China Bank of Communications took over the holdings of the Deutsch-Asiatische Bank, including its properties in Shanghai.

The Bank of Communications had been founded in 1908. It opened a branch in Shanghai the same year, and grew rapidly throughout the 1920s and 1930s. It made plans to construct a new headquarters on the current site, but these plans were disrupted in 1937 after the Japanese occupied Shanghai during the Second Sino-Japanese War. After the Japanese surrendered in 1945 the bank returned, and completed its construction of the current building in 1948. It was the last building to be completed on the Bund before the Communists took control of Shanghai in 1949.

== Bibliography ==
- Shea, Marilyn. "The Bund - Picture Guide to Historic Buildings". The University of Maine. 2007. Retrieved September 22, 2012.
