= Liang (mass) =

Traditional Chinese unit for weight

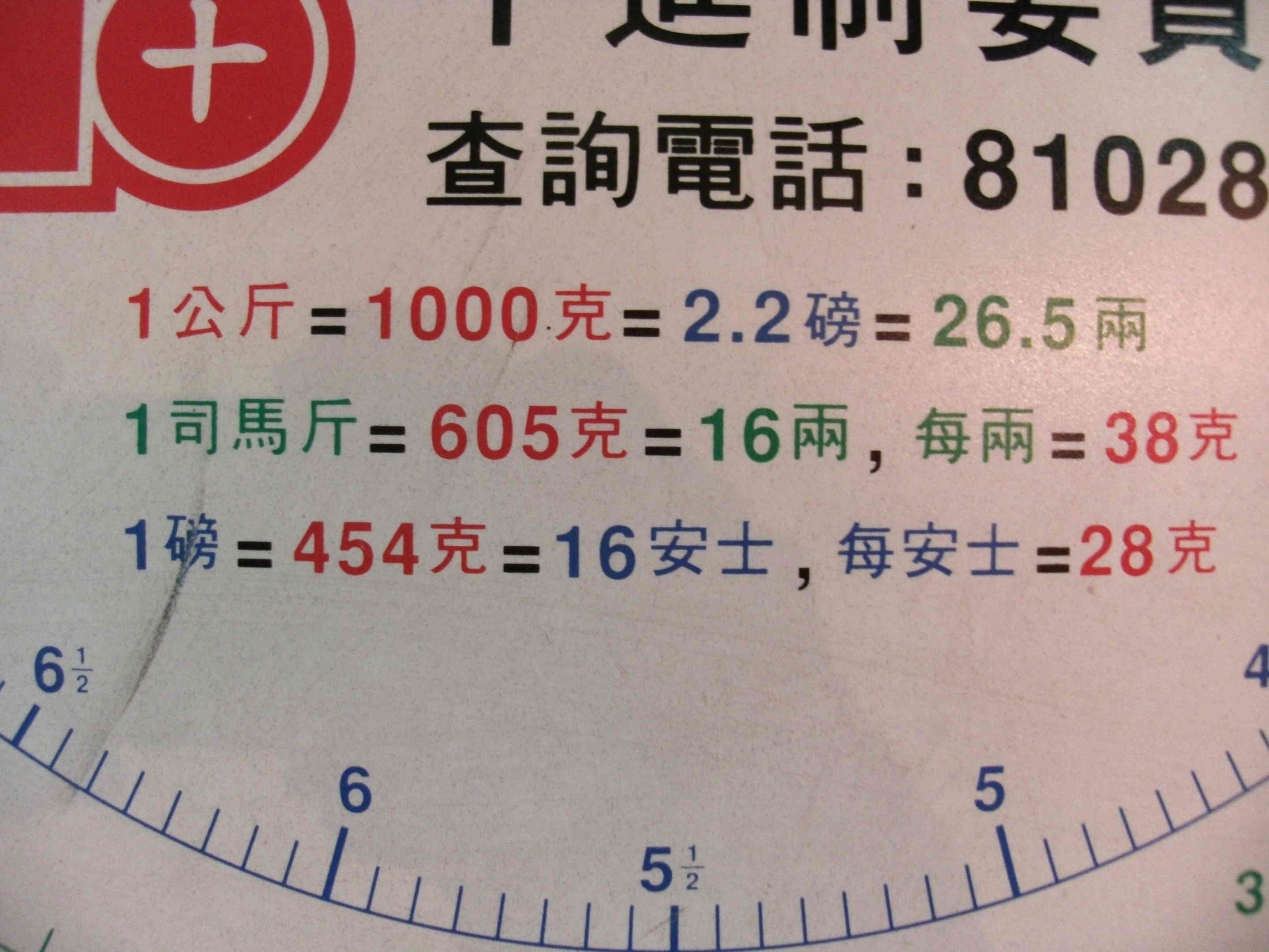
A spring scale in Hong Kong shows conversions between metric system (in red), traditional Chinese unit (in green) and British Imperial Units (in blue)

Liang (simplified Chinese: 两; traditional Chinese: 兩; pinyin: liǎng), or leung in Cantonese, liae in Wenzhounese, liong in Hakka, lian in Shanghainese, also called "Chinese ounce" or "tael", (Note: "tael" is a borrowing from the Portuguese translation of Chinese measure unit word "兩", before Pinyin and Jyutping Romanizations were available.) is a traditional Chinese unit for weight measurement. It originated in China before being introduced to neighboring countries in East and Southeast Asia.

Modern standards for the liang include 1/10 jin (50 grams) in mainland China, 37.5 grams in Taiwan and Korea, 37.799 grams in Hong Kong, Singapore and Malaysia, and 37.8 grams in Vietnam.

Liang is mostly used in traditional markets, and is a well-known measure for gold, silver and Chinese medicines.

== Mainland China ==
=== Chinese mass units promulgated in 1915 ===
On 7 January 1915, the Beiyang government promulgated a measurement law to use not only metric system as the standard but also a set of Chinese-style measures based directly on the Qing dynasty definitions (营造尺库平制).

Table of Chinese mass units promulgated in 1915
Pinyin	Character	Relative value	Metric value	Imperial value	Notes
háo	毫	1/10000	3.7301 mg	0.0001316 oz	
lí	釐	1/1000	37.301 mg	0.001316 oz	cash
fēn	分	1/100	373.01 mg	0.01316 oz	candareen
qián	錢	1/10	3.7301 g	0.1316 oz	mace or Chinese dram
liǎng	兩	1	37.301 g	1.316 oz	tael or Chinese ounce
jīn	斤	16	596.816 g	1.316 lb	catty or Chinese pound

where liang is the base unit, equal to 37.301 grams.

=== Mass units in the Republic of China since 1930 ===
On 16 February 1929, the Nationalist government adopted and promulgated The Weights and Measures Act to adopt the metric system as the official standard and to limit the newer Chinese units of measurement to private sales and trade, effective on 1 January 1930. These newer "market" units are based on rounded metric numbers. And jin became the base unit.

Table of mass units in the Republic of China since 1930
Pinyin	Character	Relative value	Metric value	Imperial value	Notes
sī	絲	1/1600000	312.5 μg	0.00001102 oz	
háo	毫	1/160000	3.125 mg	0.0001102 oz	
lí	市釐	1/16000	31.25 mg	0.001102 oz	cash
fēn	市分	1/1600	312.5 mg	0.01102 oz	candareen
qián	市錢	1/160	3.125 g	0.1102 oz	mace or Chinese dram
liǎng	市兩	1/16	31.25 g	1.102 oz	tael or Chinese ounce
jīn	市斤	1	500 g	1.102 lb	catty or Chinese pound
dàn	擔	100	50 kg	110.2 lb	picul or Chinese hundredweight

where one liang is equal to 1/16 of a jin, or 31.25 grams.

=== Mass units in the People's Republic of China since 1959 ===
On June 25, 1959, the State Council of the People's Republic of China issued the "Order on the Unified Measurement System", retaining the market measure system, with the statement of "The market system originally stated that sixteen liangs are equal to one jin. Due to the trouble of conversion, it should be changed to ten liangs per jin."

Table of mass units in the People's Republic of China since 1959
Pinyin	Character	Relative value	Metric value	Imperial value	Notes
lí	市厘	1/10000	50 mg	0.001764 oz	cash
fēn	市分	1/1000	500 mg	0.01764 oz	candareen
qián	市錢	1/100	5 g	0.1764 oz	mace or Chinese dram
liǎng	市兩	1/10	50 g	1.764 oz	tael or Chinese ounce
jīn	市斤	1	500 g	1.102 lb	catty or Chinese pound formerly 16 liang = 1 jin
dàn	市擔	100	50 kg	110.2 lb	picul or Chinese hundredweight

Legally, 1 jin equals 500 grams, and 10 liangs equal 1 jin (that is, 1 liang equals 50 grams). The traditional Chinese medicine measurement system remains unchanged.

== Taiwan ==
In 1895, Taiwan was ceded to Japan from China. The Japanese implemented the metric system, but the Taiwanese still followed their own habits and continued to use the old weights and measures of the Qing dynasty. 1 Taiwan liang is equal to 37.5 grams, or 1/16 Taiwan jin.

Table of units of mass in Taiwan
Unit				Relative value	Metric		US & Imperial		Notes
Taiwanese Hokkien	Hakka	Mandarin	Character	Relative value	Legal	Decimal	Exact	Approx.	Notes
Lî	Lî	Lí	釐	1/1000	3/80,000 kg	37.5 mg	3750/45,359,237 lb	0.5787 gr	Cash; Same as Japanese Rin
Hun	Fûn	Fēn	分	1/100	3/8000 kg	375 mg	37,500/45,359,237 lb	5.787 gr	Candareen; Same as Japanese Fun
Chîⁿ	Chhièn	Qián	錢	1/10	3/800 kg	3.75 g	375,000/45,359,237 lb	2.116 dr	Mace; Same as Japanese Momme (匁)
Niú	Liông	Liǎng	兩	1	3/80 kg	37.5 g	3,750,000/45,359,237 lb	21.16 dr	Tael
Kin/Kun	Kîn	Jīn	斤	16	3/5 kg	600 g	60,000,000/45,359,237 lb	1.323 lb	Catty; Same as Japanese Kin
Tàⁿ	Tâm	Dàn	擔	1600	60 kg		6,000,000,000/45,359,237 lb	132.3 lb	Picul; Same as Japanese Tan

where liang is the base unit.

== Hong Kong and Macau ==
=== Hong Kong and Macau mass units ===
The liang is a legal weight measure in Hong Kong, and is still in active use. One liang is 37.799364167 g, and in Ordinance 22 of 1884 is 1 1/3 oz. avoir. Similar to Hong Kong, in Singapore, one tael is defined as 1 1/3 ounce and is approximated as 37.7994 g. In Hong Kong and Singapore, one liang is equivalent to 10 qian (Chinese: 錢; pinyin: qián) or 1/16 jin,. These Chinese units of measurement are usually used in Chinese herbal medicine stores as well as gold and silver exchange.

Table of Chinese mass units in Hong Kong and Macau
Jyutping	Character	English	Portuguese	Relative value	Relation to the Traditional Chinese Units (Macau)	Metric value	Imperial value	Notes
lei4	厘	li (cash)	liz	1/16000	1/10 condorim	37.79931 mg	0.02133 dr	
fan1	分	fen (fan, candareen)	condorim	1/1600	1/10 maz	377.9936375 mg	0.2133 dr	
cin4	錢	qian (tsin, mace)	maz	1/160	1/10 tael	3.779936375 g	2.1333 dr	
loeng2	兩	liang (leung, tael)	tael	1/16	1/16 cate	37.79936375 g	1.3333 oz	604.78982/16=37.79936375
gan1	斤	jin (gan, catty)	cate	1	1/100 pico	604.78982 g	1.3333 lb	Hong Kong and Macau share the definition.
daam3	擔	dan (tam, picul)	pico	100	None	60.478982 kg	133.3333 lb	Hong Kong and Macau share the definition.

Similarly, Singapore law stipulates that one jin is also equal to sixteen liangs or 0.6048 kilograms, and one liang equals 37.799 g. Malaysia has the same regulations as it is a former British colony.

=== Hong Kong troy units ===
These are used for trading precious metals such as gold and silver.

Table of mass (Hong Kong troy) units
English	Character	Relative value	Metric value	Imperial value	Notes
fen (candareen) troy	金衡分	1/100	374.29 mg	0.096 drt	
qian (mace) troy	金衡錢	1/10	3.7429 g	0.96 drt	
liang (tael) troy	金衡兩	1	37.429 g	1.2 ozt	

== Korea ==
The base unit of Korean weight is the gwan. One liang (兩, Korean ounce) is 1/100 of a gwan, or 37.5 g (1.32 oz).

Table of mass units in Korea
Romanization			Korean	English	Equivalents		
RR	MR	Other	Korean	English	Gwan	Other countries	Global
Ho	Ho		호(毫)		1/1,000,000		3.75 mg (0.0579 gr)
Mo	Mo		모(毛)		1/1,000,000		3.75 mg (0.0579 gr)
Ri	Ri		리(釐/厘)	li	1/100,000		0.0375 g (0.00132 oz)
Pun	P'un		푼	fen	1/10,000		0.375 g (0.0132 oz)
Bun	Pun		분(分)	fen	1/10,000		0.375 g (0.0132 oz)
Don	Ton		돈		1/1,000	Momme	3.75 g (0.132 oz)
Nyang	Nyang	Ryang Yang	냥(兩)	liang (Korean ounce)	1/100	Tael	37.5 g (1.32 oz)
Geun	Kŭn	Keun Kon	근(斤)	jin (Korean pound)	4/25 (meat), 1/10 (others)	Jin, Catty	600 g (21 oz) (meat),375 g (13.2 oz) (others)
Gwan	Kwan		관(貫)		1		3.75 kg (8.3 lb)

== Vietnam ==
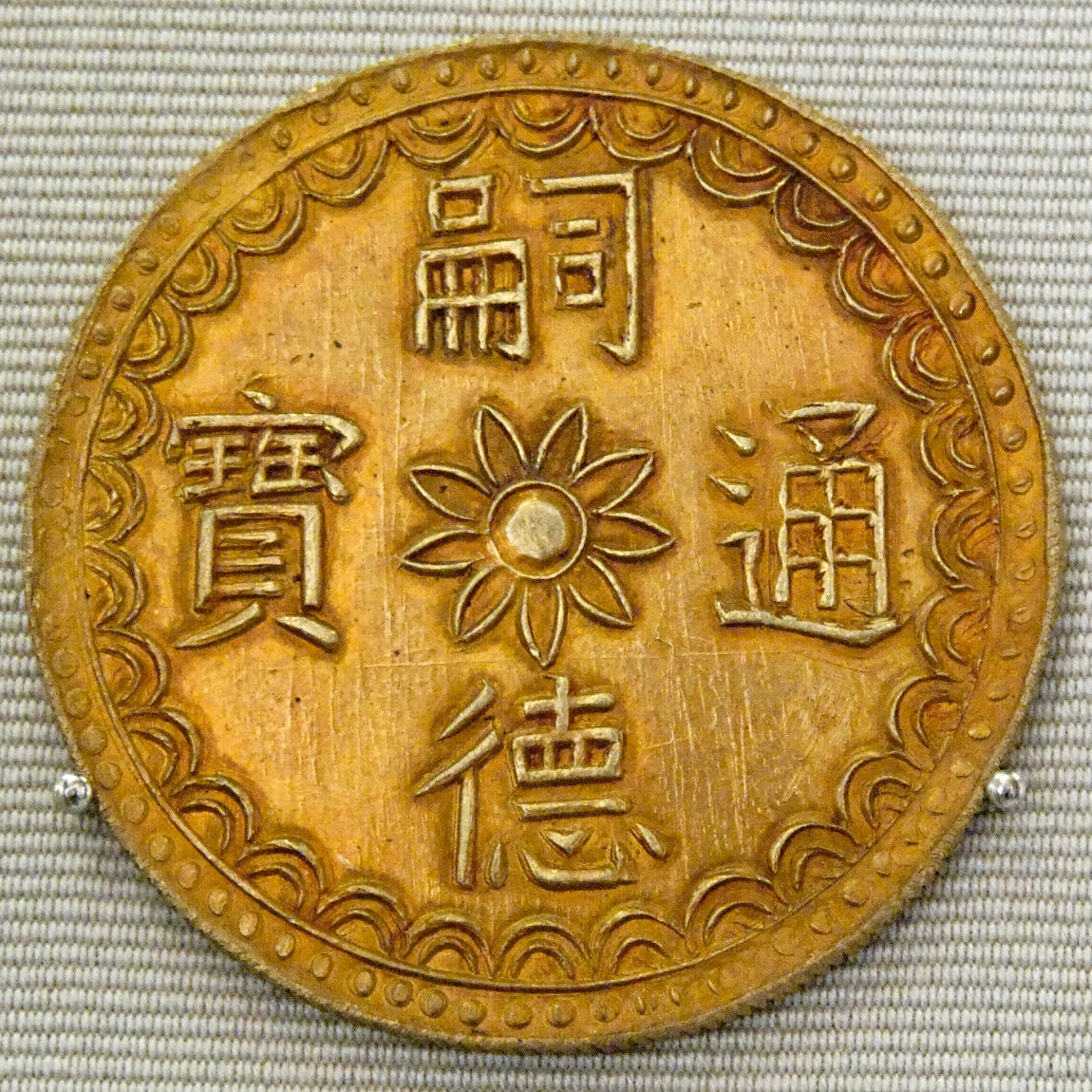
Gold lạng (Tael) of Tự Đức.

In Vietnam, the unit of liang is called "lang". In the time of French Indochina, the colonial administration fixed the (lạng) as 100 g, which is commonly used at food markets where many items typically weigh in the 100–900 g range. However, a different lang (called cây, lạng, or lượng) unit of 37.5 g is used for domestic transactions in gold. Real estate prices are often quoted in liangs of gold rather than the local currency over concerns over monetary inflation.

Early 20th-century units of weight
Name in Chữ Quốc ngữ	Hán/Nôm name	Traditional value	Traditional conversion	Modern value	Modern conversion
tấn	擯	604.5 kg	10 tạ	1 000 kg	10 tạ
quân		302.25 kg	5 tạ	500 kg	obsolete
tạ	榭	60.45 kg	10 yến	100 kg	10 yến
bình		30.225 kg	5 yến	50 kg	obsolete
yến		6.045 kg	10 cân	10 kg	10 cân
cân (jin)	斤	604.5 g	16 lạng	1 kg	10 lạng
nén		378 g	10 lạng		
lạng (liang)	兩	37.8 g	10 đồng	100 g	
đồng or tiền (qian)	錢	3.78 g	10 phân		
phân	分	0.38 g	10 ly		
ly or li	厘	37.8 mg	10 hào		
hào	毫	3.8 mg	10 ti		
ti	絲	0.4 mg	10 hốt		
hốt	忽	0.04 mg	10 vi		
vi	微	0.004 mg			

For more information on the Chinese mass measurement system, please see article Jin (mass).

== Compounds ==
- wikt:幾斤幾兩 (jǐjīnjǐliǎng)
- wikt:半斤八兩 (bànjīnbāliǎng)
- wikt:缺斤少兩 (quējīnshǎoliǎng)
- wikt:銀兩 (yínliǎng)

== Names ==
The English word tael /ˈteɪl/ comes through Portuguese from the Malay word tahil, meaning "weight". Early English forms of the name such as "tay" or "taes" derive from the Portuguese plural of tael, taeis. Tahil (/ˈtɑːhɪl/ in Singaporean English) is used in Malay and English today when referring to the weight in Malaysia, Singapore, and Brunei, where it is still used in some contexts especially related to the significant Overseas Chinese population.

== See also ==
- Liang (currency)
- Chinese units of measurement
- Hong Kong units of measurement
- Taiwanese units of measurement
- Korean units of measurement
- Vietnamese units of measurement
