= Liang (currency) =

Traditional Asian unit of mass

Chinese name
- Traditional Chinese: 兩
- Simplified Chinese: 两
Transcriptions
Standard Mandarin
- Hanyu Pinyin: liǎng
- Wade–Giles: liang
Yue: Cantonese
- Yale Romanization: léuhng
- Jyutping: loeng5
Southern Min
- Hokkien POJ: niú, nió•

Vietnamese name
- Vietnamese: lượng, lạng
- Hán-Nôm: 兩

Korean name
- Hanja: 兩

North Korean name
- Chosŏn'gŭl: 량
Transcriptions
- Revised Romanization: ryang

South Korean name
- Hangul: 냥
Transcriptions
- Revised Romanization: nyang

Mongolian name
- Mongolian Cyrillic: лан
- Mongolian script: ᠯᠠᠨ
Transcriptions
- SASM/GNC: lan

Japanese name
- Kanji: 両
- Hiragana: りょう(hist. りゃう)
Transcriptions
- Romanization: ryō

Malay name
- Malay: tahil / تهيل (Jawi)

Indonesian name
- Indonesian: tahil

Manchu name
- Manchu script: ᠶᠠᠨ
- Möllendorff: yan

Khmer name
- Khmer: តាល

Tangut name
- Tangut: 𗍬
- Miyake transcription: 2lu3

Buryat name
- Buryat: лан

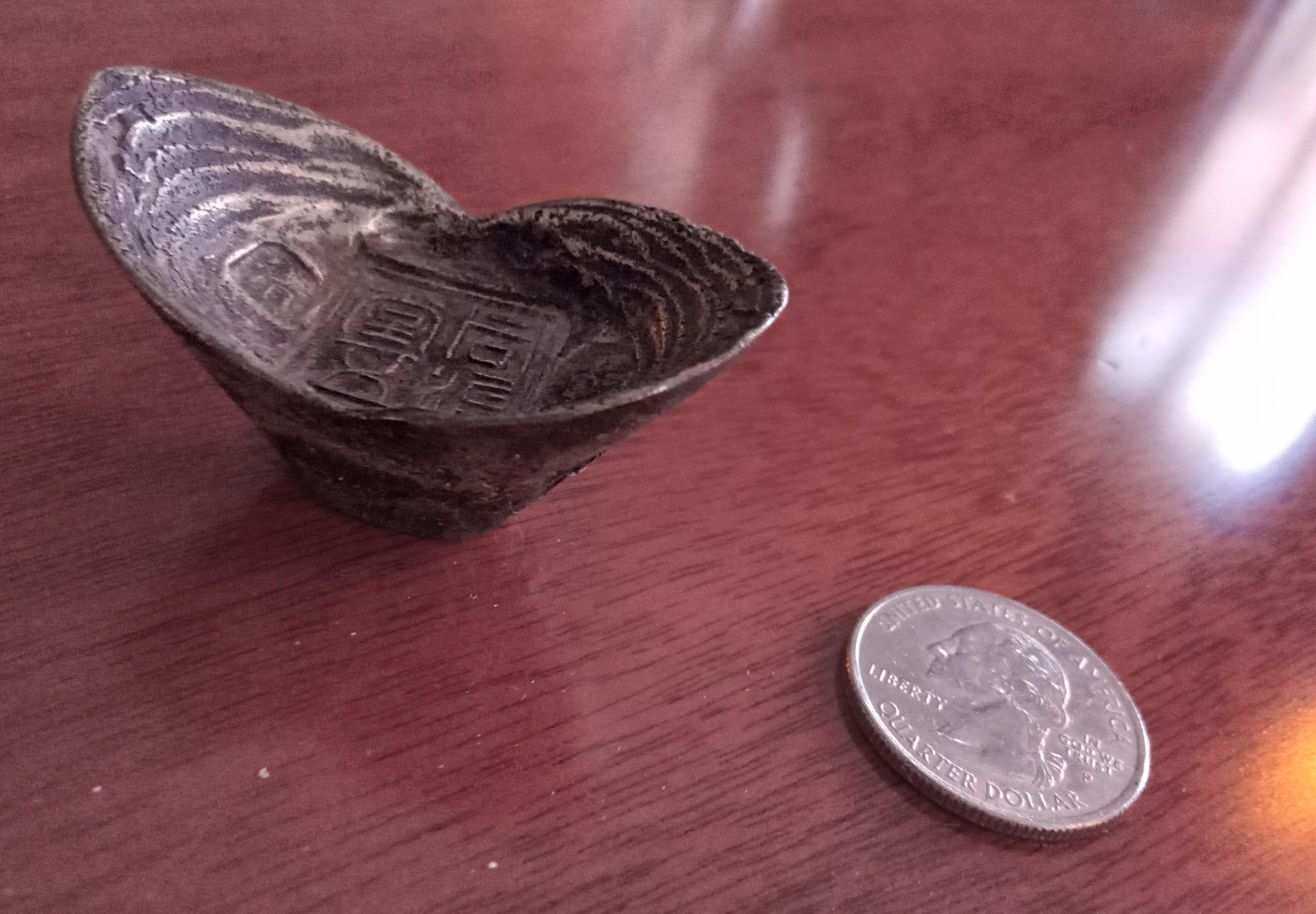
(Coin's diameter c. 2.5 cm)

Liang (simplified Chinese: 两; traditional Chinese: 兩; pinyin: liǎng), or leung in Cantonese, also called "Chinese ounce" or "tael", (Note: "tael" is a borrowing from the Portuguese translation of Chinese measure unit word "兩", before Pinyin and Jyutping Romanizations were available.) was a traditional Chinese unit of currency measurement.

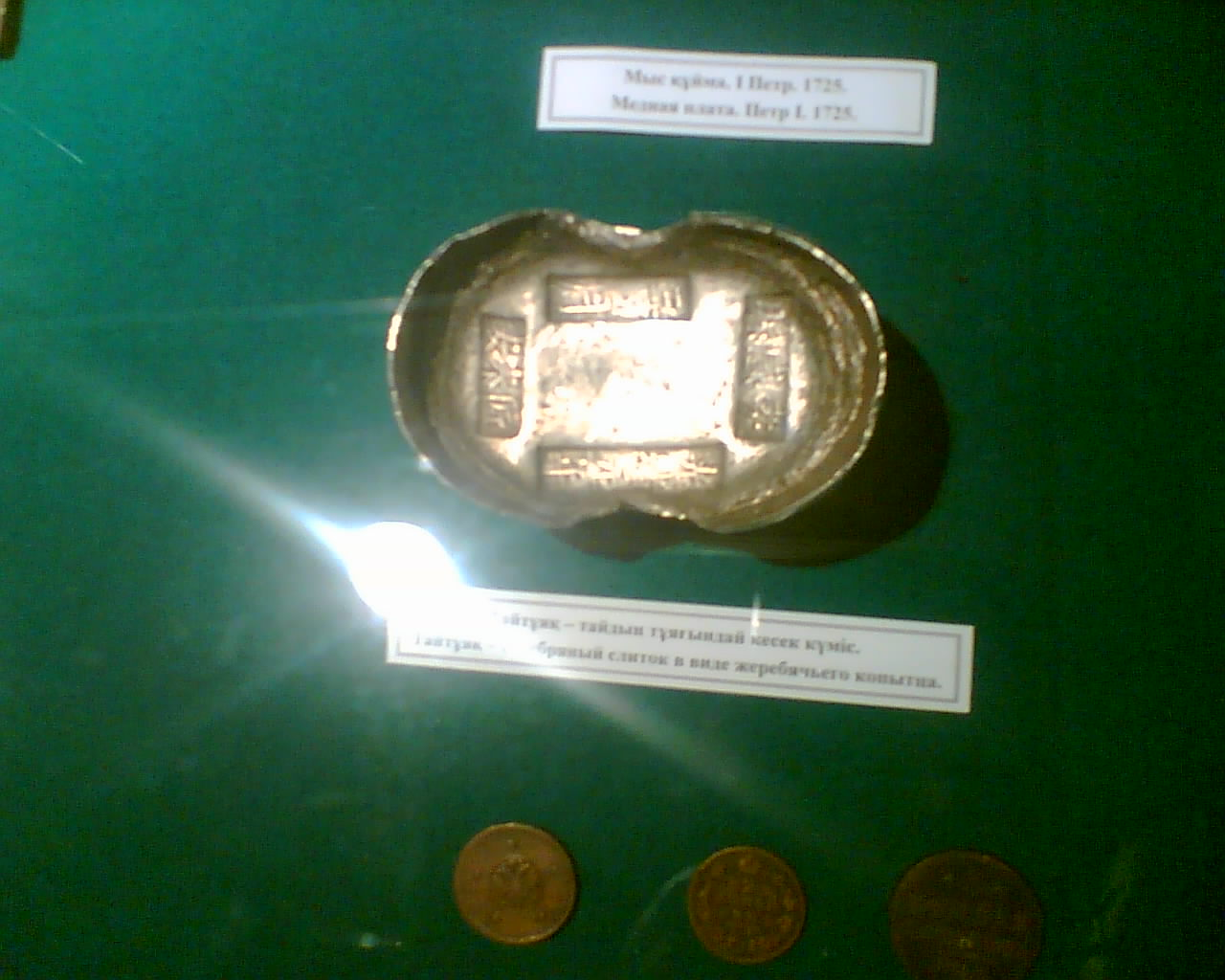
A Chinese silver liǎng (銀兩 / 银两) with stamps Used in Central Asia as a "Silver Hoof" ingot.

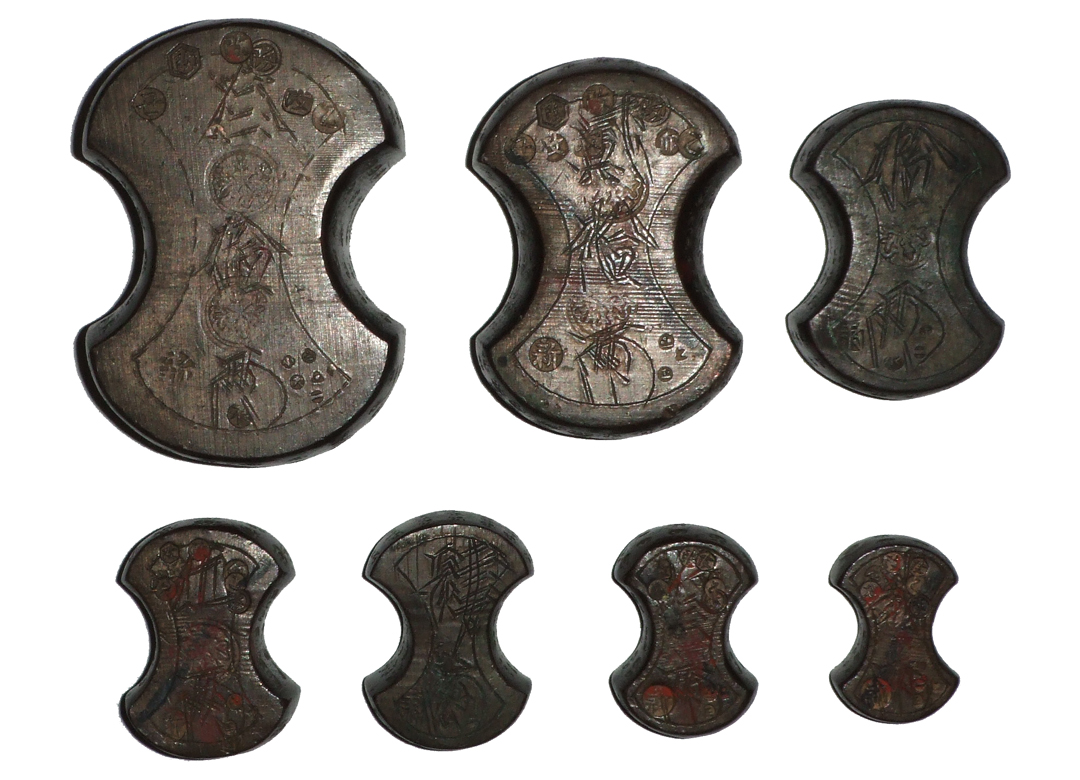
Japanese Edo era liang weights for balance scales, made of bronze. In descending size, 30, 20, 10, 5, 4, 3, and 2 liang weights.

In China, there were many different weighting standards of liang currency depending on the region or type of trade. In general, the silver liang weighed around 40 grams (1.3 ozt). The most common government measurement was the Kuping (庫平; kùpíng; 'treasury standard') liang, weighing 37.5 grams (1.21 ozt). A common commercial weight, the Caoping (漕平; cáopíng; 'canal shipping standard') liang weighed 36.7 grams (1.18 ozt) of marginally less pure silver.

== Imperial China ==
Traditional Chinese silver sycees and other currencies of fine metals were not denominated or made by a central mint and their value was determined by their weight in liangs. They were made by individual silversmiths for local exchange, and as such the shape and amount of extra detail on each ingot were highly variable; square and oval shapes were common but "boat", flower, tortoise and others are known. The liang was still used in Qing dynasty coinage as the basis of the silver currency and sycee remained in use until the end of the dynasty in 1911. Common weights were 50, 10, 5 and one liang. Before the year 1840 the government of the Qing dynasty had set the official exchange rate between silver sycees and copper-alloy cash coins was set at 1,000 wén for 1 liang of silver before 1820, but after the year 1840 this official exchange rate was double to 2,000 wén to 1 liang.

During the reign of the Xianfeng Emperor, the government of the Qing dynasty was forced to re-introduce paper money, among the paper money it produced were the Hubu Guanpiao (戶部官票) silver notes that were denominated in liangs.

The forced opening of China during the Qing dynasty created a number of treaty ports alongside the China's main waterways and its coastal areas, these treaty ports would fundamentally change both the monetary system of China as well as its banking system, these changes were introduced by the establishment of European and American merchant houses and later banks that would engage in the Chinese money exchange and trade finance.

Between the years 1840 and 1900, 1 market liang was worth 1.38 Spanish dollars.

Various Western banking companies, the largest of which were the HSBC, and later Japanese banking companies started to begin to accept deposits. They would issue banknotes which were convertible into silver; these banknotes were popularized among the Chinese public that resided in the treaty ports.

An important development during this era was the establishment of the Imperial Maritime Customs Service. This agency was placed in charge of collecting transit taxes for traded goods that were shipped both in and out of the Chinese Empire, these rules and regulations were all stipulated in various trade treaties that were imposed on the Qing by the Western colonial powers. Because these changes were implemented during the height of the Taiping Rebellion, the Western powers had managed to take over the complete administration of the Qing's maritime customs from the imperial Chinese governmental bureaucracy.

The Imperial Maritime Customs Service developed the Haikwan liang (海關兩), this new form of measurement was an abstract unit of silver liang that would become the nationwide standard unit of account in silver for any form of Customs tax. The Haikwan liang was preferred over the Kuping liang (庫平兩) by many merchants across China, this was because the units of the Kuping tliang varied often to the advantage of imperial tax collectors, this form of corruption was an extra source of income for government bureaucrats at the expense of traders. The Haikwan liang unit was completely uniform, it was very carefully defined, and its creation had been negotiated among the various colonial powers and the government of the Qing dynasty. The Haikwan liang was on average 5% to 10% larger than the various local liang units that had existed in China, this was done as it deliberately excluded any form of extra surcharges which were embedded in the other units of the silver liang that existed as a form of intermediary income for local government tax collection, these surcharges were added to local liangs as a form of corruption and these taxes never reached the imperial government under the traditional fiscal regime.

Near the end of the Qing dynasty, one dìng (sycee, or yuanbao) was about 50 liangs.

== Conversion rates in imperial China ==
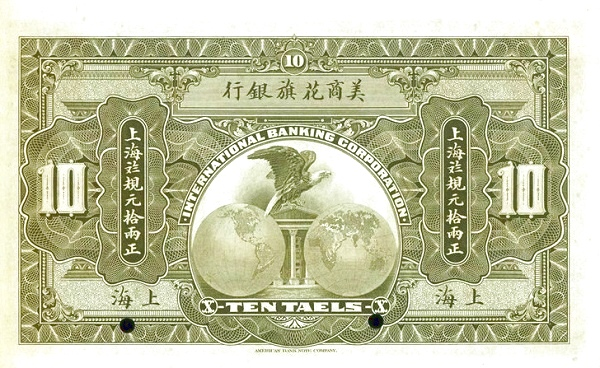
Shanghai 10 liang banknote issued by Citibank

The local liang took precedence over any central measure. Thus, the Canton liang weighed 37.5 grams (1.21 ozt), the Convention or Shanghai liang was 33.9 grams (1.09 ozt), and the Haiguan (海關; hǎiguān; 'customs') liang 37.8 grams (1.22 ozt). The conversion rates between various common liangs were well known.

== Republic of China ==
In 1933, the Republic of China abolished the liang and completely replaced it with the yuan in a process known as the fei liang gai yuan (廢兩改元; 'Abolishing liang and changing to yuan'). During this time the Republican government cleared all banknotes denominated in the liang currency, making all bills which used this currency unit obsolete.

== Purchasing power ==
Modern studies suggest that, on purchasing power parity basis, one liang of silver was worth about 4,130 yuan RMB in the early Tang dynasty, 2,065 yuan RMB in the late Tang dynasty, and 660.8 yuan RMB in the mid Ming dynasty. As of February 2024, the price of silver is about 254 yuan RMB/liang of 50 g.

== See also ==
- Liang (mass)
- History of Chinese currency
- Economic history of China
