= Comparison of the imperial and US customary measurement systems =

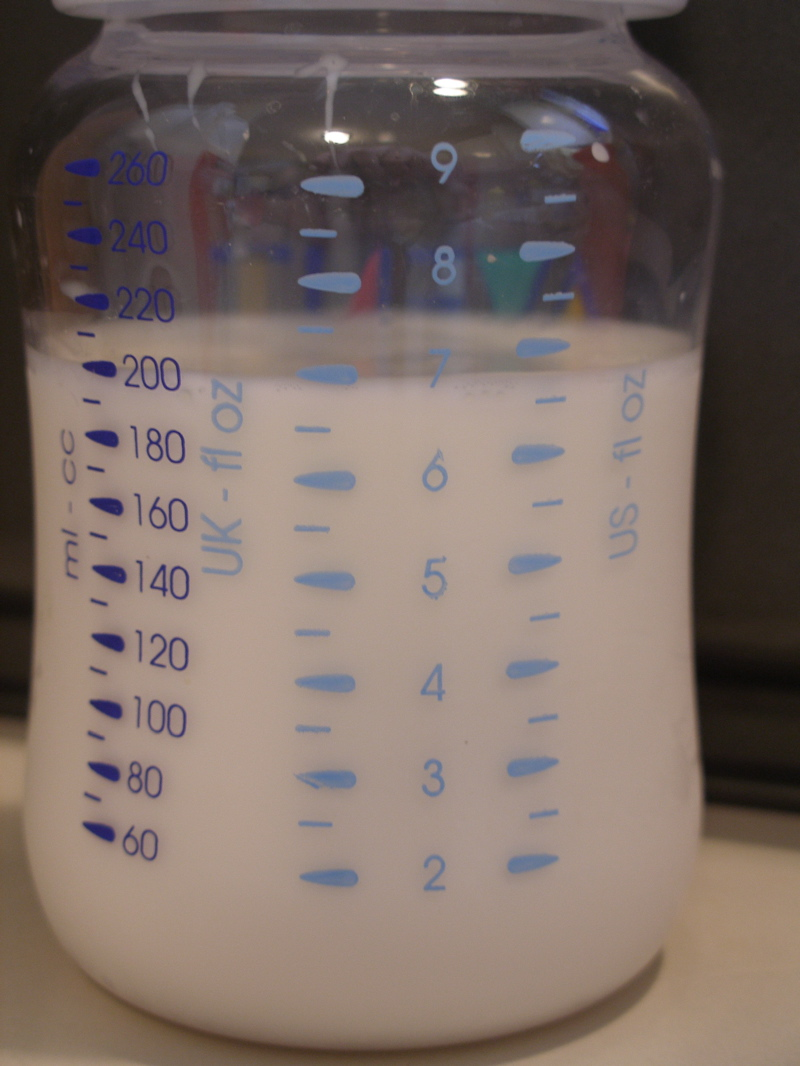
A baby bottle with measurements in metric, imperial and US customary

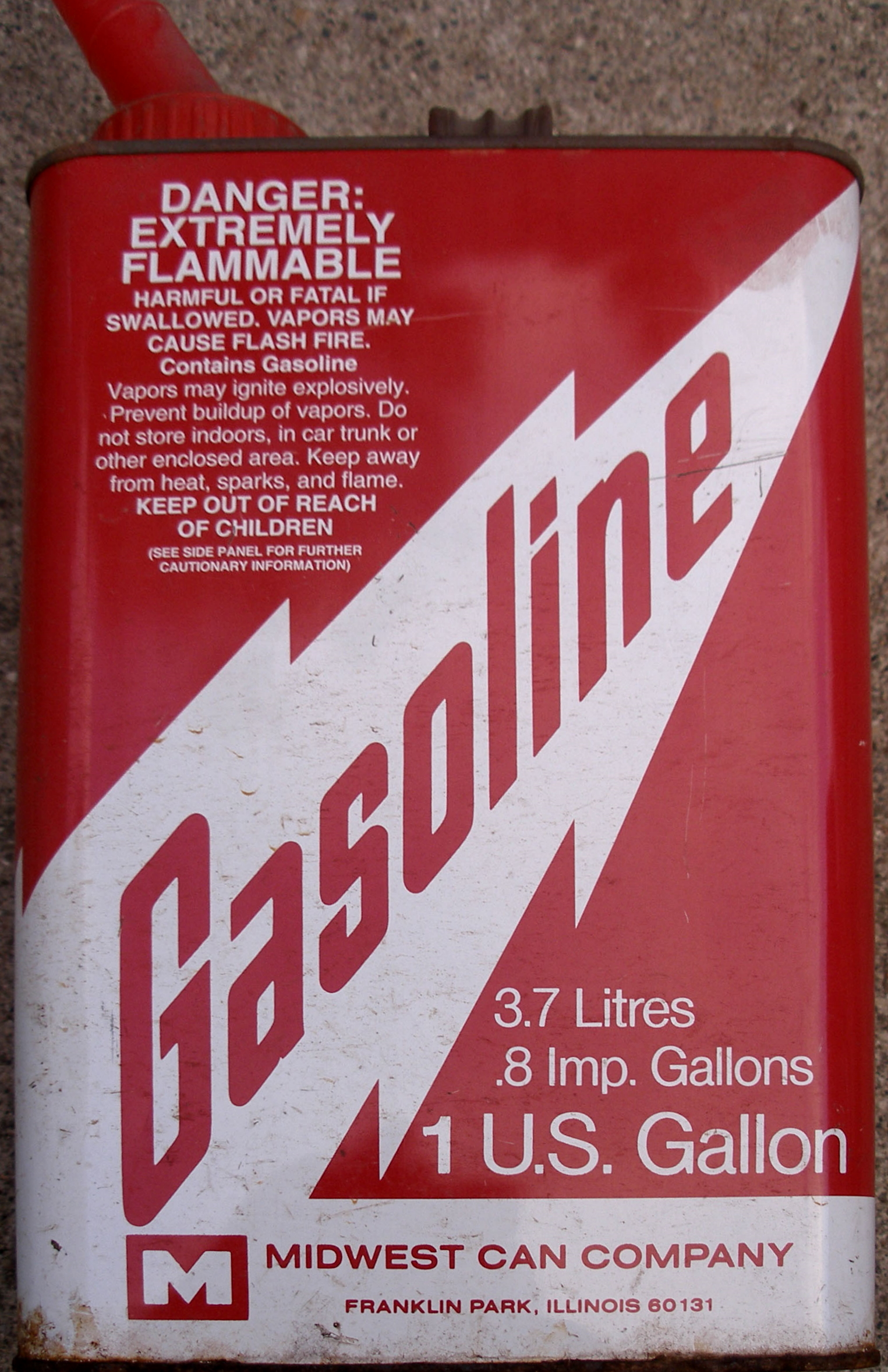
A one-US-gallon petrol can purchased near the US–Canada border showing equivalents in imperial gallons and litres

Both the British imperial measurement system and United States customary systems of measurement derive from earlier English unit systems used prior to 1824 that were the result of a combination of the local Anglo-Saxon units inherited from Germanic tribes and Roman units.

Having this shared heritage, the two systems are quite similar, but there are differences. The US customary system is based on English systems of the 18th century, while the imperial system was defined in 1824, almost a half-century after American independence.

== Volume ==
Volume may be measured either in terms of units of cubic length or with specific volume units. The units of cubic length (the cubic inch, cubic foot, cubic mile, etc.) are the same in the imperial and US customary systems, but they differ in their specific units of volume (the bushel, gallon, fluid ounce, etc.).

The US customary system has a set of units for fluids, it has a different measure for dry goods for the pint, quart and barrel, and a peck and bushel for dry goods only. The imperial system has only one set of measurements, defined independently of the US customary system.

By the end of the 18th century, various systems of volume measurement were in use throughout the British Empire. Wine was measured with "wine cask" units based on the wine gallon of 231 cubic inches (3.785 L), while beer was measured with "brewery cask" units based on an ale gallon of 282 cubic inches (4.621 L) and grain was measured with the Winchester measure, with a dry gallon of approximately 268.8 cubic inches (one eighth of a Winchester bushel or 4.405 L). In 1824, these units were replaced with a single system based on the imperial gallon. (Note: Wine gallons, however, continued to be used for tax purposes in the UK until the late 1990s.) Originally defined as the volume of 10 pounds (4.54 kg) of distilled water (under certain conditions), (Note: The water was to be weighed in air with brass weights with the barometer standing at 30 inches of mercury (102 kPa) at a temperature of 62 °F (17 °C). In 1963 these conditions were redefined such that the water was to have a density of 0.998859 g/mL and to be weighed in air of density 0.001217 g/mL against weights of density 8.136 g/mL.) then redefined by the Weights and Measures Act 1985 to be exactly 4.54609 L (≈277.42 cu in), the imperial gallon is 1.62% smaller than the pre-1824 ale gallon.

The Winchester measure was made obsolete in the British Empire, but remained in use in the US until the 1990s. (Note: Originally defined as the volume of a cylinder 18 1/2 inches (470 mm) in diameter and 8 inches (200 mm) deep, the Winchester bushel was redefined in the US as 2150.42 cubic inches.) In the British Empire, the Winchester bushel was replaced with an imperial bushel of eight imperial gallons, with the subdivisions of the bushel being maintained.

As with US dry measures, the imperial system divides the bushel into 4 pecks, 32 quarts or 64 pints: the imperial quart and imperial pint are 3.21% larger than their US dry counterparts, whereas the imperial peck and imperial bushel were deleted from the relevant UK statute in 1968.

Fluid measure is not as straightforward. The American colonists adopted a system based on the 231-cubic-inch wine gallon for all fluid purposes: this became the US gallon, being legally adopted in 1836. Both the imperial and US fluid gallon are divided into 4 quarts, 8 pints or 32 gills. (Note: The gill is no longer in common use.) However, whereas the US gill is divided into four US fluid ounces, the imperial gill is divided into five imperial fluid ounces. Thus, while the imperial fluid ounce is 3.924% smaller than the US fluid ounce, the imperial gallon, quart, pint and gill are all 20.095% larger than their US counterparts. (Note: The now rarely used apothecaries' system of fluid measures further divides the fluid ounce into 8 fluid drams or 480 minims, and in the imperial system there is a fluid scruple of 20 minims, which is absent from the US customary system. Like the fluid ounce, the dram and minim are 3.924% smaller in the imperial system.)

One avoirdupois ounce of water has an approximate volume of one imperial fluid ounce at 62 °F (16.7 °C): (Note: 160 imperial fluid ounces is equivalent to one imperial gallon, which is the approximate volume of 10 pounds (or 160 avoirdupois ounces) of water at 62 °F.) this convenient fluid ounce to avoirdupois ounce relation does not exist in the US system, as one US fluid ounce is 4.318% larger than the avoirdupois ounce.

One noticeable comparison between the imperial system and the US system is between some Canadian and American beer bottles: many Canadian brewers package their beer in 12 imperial fl oz bottles, which are 341 mL each, while American brewers package their beer in 12 US fl oz bottles, which are 355 mL each. Consequently, Canadian bottles are labelled as 11.5 fl oz in US units when imported into the United States.

Because the standard size of Canadian beer bottles predates the adoption of the metric system in Canada, the bottles are still sold and labelled in Canada as 341 mL. Canned beer in Canada is sold and labelled in 355 mL cans (12.5 imperial fl oz), and when exported to the United States, they are labelled as 12 fl oz.

Comparison of current imperial, US and metric volume measures
Notes: Approximate values are denoted with ≈; Exact values are denoted with ≡; Definitions are marked in **bold**
Unit name	Imperial measures	US fluid measures	US dry measures	Metric measures
fluid ounces
Imperial fluid ounce (fl oz)	≡ **1 imp fl oz**	≈ 0.9607599 US fl oz ≡ 0.94710208333 US fl oz (food)		≡ 28.4130625 mL ≡ 0.0284130625 L
US fluid ounce (customary) (fl oz)	≈ 1.0408427 imp fl oz	≡ **1 US fl oz** ≡ 0.98578431875 US fl oz (food)		≡ 29.5735295625 mL ≡ 0.0295735295625 L
US fluid ounce (food nutrition labelling) (fl oz) (food)	≈ 1.0558524 imp fl oz	≈ 1.0144207 US fl oz ≡ **1 US fl oz (food)**		≡ **30 mL** ≡ 0.03 L
pints
Imperial pint (pt)	≡ **20 imp fl oz** ≡ **1 imp pt** ≡ 0.5 imp qt ≡ 0.125 imp gal	≈ 19.2152 US fl oz ≈ 18.9420416667 US fl oz (food) ≈ 1.20095 US pt ≈ 0.15011874 US gal	≈ 1.0320567 US dry pt	≡ 568.26125 mL ≡ 0.56826125 L
US liquid pint (pt)	≈ 16.6534836 imp fl oz ≈ 0.8326742 imp pt ≈ 0.1040843 imp gal	≡ **16 US fl oz** ≡ 15.7725491 US fl oz (food) ≡ **1 US pt** ≡ 0.5 US qt ≡ 0.125 US gal	≈ 0.859367 US dry pt	≡ 473.176473 mL ≡ 0.473176473 L
US dry pint (pt)	≈ 19.3787794 imp fl oz ≈ 0.968939 imp pt ≈ 0.1211174 imp gal	≈ 18.618355 US fl oz ≈ 18.353682 US fl oz (food) ≈ 1.1636472 US pt ≈ 0.1454559 US gal	≡ **1 US dry pt** ≡ 0.5 US dry qt	≡ 550.6104713575 mL ≡ 0.5506104713575 L
quarts
Imperial quart (qt)	≡ **40 imp fl oz** ≡ **1 imp qt** ≡ 2 imp pt ≡ 0.25 imp gal	≈ 38.4304 US fl oz ≈ 37.8840833333 US fl oz (food) ≈ 1.200945 US qt ≈ 0.3002375 US gal	≈ 1.0320567 US dry qt	≡ 1136.5225 mL ≡ 1.1365225 L
US liquid quart (qt)	≈ 33.3069674 imp fl oz ≈ 0.8326742 imp qt ≈ 0.2081685 imp gal	≡ **32 US fl oz** ≡ 31.5450982 US fl oz (food) ≡ 2 US pt ≡ **1 US qt** ≡ 0.25 US gal	≈ 0.859367 US dry qt	≡ 946.352946 mL ≡ 0.946352946 L
US dry quart (qt)	≈ 38.7575589 imp fl oz ≈ 0.968939 imp qt ≈ 0.2422347 imp gal	≈ 37.23671 US fl oz ≈ 36.7073648 US fl oz (food) ≈ 1.1636472 US qt ≈ 0.2909118 US gal	≡ **1 US dry qt** ≡ 2 US dry pt	≡ 1101.220942715 mL ≡ 1.101220942715 L
gallons
Imperial gallon (gal)	≡ 160 imp fl oz ≡ **4 imp qt** ≡ **1 imp gal**	≈ 153.7216 US fl oz ≈ 151.536333333 US fl oz (food) ≈ 1.20095 US gal	≈ 4.128227 US dry qt	≡ 4546.09 mL ≡ **4.54609 L**
US gallon (gal)	≈ 133.2278695 imp fl oz ≈ 3.3306967 imp qt ≈ 0.8326742 imp gal	≡ 128 US fl oz ≡ 126.1803928 US fl oz (food) ≡ **4 US qt** ≡ **1 US gal** ≡ **231 cu in**	≈ 3.437468 US dry qt	≡ 3785.411784 mL ≡ 3.785411784 L
metric
litre (l or L or dm^{3})	≈ 35.1950797 imp fl oz ≈ 0.879877 imp qt ≈ 0.21996925 imp gal	≈ 33.8140227 US fl oz ≈ 33.3333333333 US fl oz (food) ≈ 1.0566882 US qt ≈ 0.26417205 US gal	≈ 0.908083 US dry qt	≡ **1000 mL** ≡ **1 L**

== Length ==
The international yard is defined as exactly 0.9144 metres. This definition was approved by the United States, Canada, the United Kingdom, South Africa, Australia and New Zealand through the international yard and pound agreement of 1959, and corresponds with the previous 1930s British and American definitions of 1 inch being 25.4 mm. In all systems, a yard is 36 inches.

The US survey foot and survey mile were maintained as separate units for surveying purposes to avoid the accumulation of error that would follow replacing them with the international versions, particularly with State Plane Coordinate Systems. The choice of unit for surveying purposes is based on the unit used when the overall framework or geodetic datum for the region was established; for example, much of the former British empire still uses the Clarke foot for surveying.

The US survey foot is defined so that 1 metre is exactly 39.37 inches, making the international foot of 0.3048 metres exactly two parts per million shorter. This is a difference of just over 3.2 mm, or a little more than one-eighth of an inch per mile. According to the National Institute of Standards and Technology, the survey foot is obsolete as of 1 January 2023, and its use discouraged.

The main units of length (inch, foot, yard and international mile) were the same in the US, though the US rarely uses some of the intermediate units today, such as the (surveyor's) chain (22 yards) and the furlong (220 yards).

At one time, the definition of the nautical mile was based on the surface area of the Clarke ellipsoid. While the US used the full value of 1853.256 metres, in the British Commonwealth, this was rounded to 6080 feet (1853.184 m). These have been replaced by the international version (which rounds the 60th part of the 45° to the nearest metre) of 1852 metres.

== Weight and mass ==
Relation of English mass weights to one another

Traditionally, both Britain and the US used three different weight systems: troy weight for precious metals, apothecaries' weight for medicines and avoirdupois weight for almost all other purposes. However, apothecaries' weight has now been superseded by the metric system.

In all of these systems, the fundamental unit is the pound (lb), and all other units are defined as fractions or multiples of a pound. The tables of imperial troy mass and apothecaries' mass are the same as the corresponding United States tables, except for the British spelling "drachm" in the table of apothecaries' mass. The table of imperial avoirdupois mass is the same as the United States table up to one pound, but above that point, the tables differ.

One important difference is the widespread use in Britain of the stone of 14 pounds (6.35029318 kg) for body weight, whereas this unit is not used in the United States, although flour was sold by a barrel of 196 pounds (14 stone) until World War II.

Another difference arises in that Britain deleted the troy pound (373.2417216 g) and the pennyweight from the relevant statute on 1 January 1879, leaving only the troy ounce (31.1034768 g) and its decimal subdivisions, whereas the troy pound (of 12 troy ounces) and pennyweight are still legal in the United States, although they are no longer widely used.

The imperial system has a hundredweight defined as eight stone of 14 lb each, or 112 lb (50.80234544 kg), whereas a US hundredweight is 100 lb (45.359237 kg): in both systems, 20 hundredweights make a ton.

In the US, the terms long ton (2240 lb, 1016.0469088 kg) and short ton (2000 lb, 907.18474 kg) are used. The metric ton is the name used for the tonne (1000 kg, 2204.62262 lb), which is 1.58% less than the long ton and is 10.23% more than the short ton.

The US customary system also includes the kip, equivalent to 1,000 pounds of force, which is also occasionally used as a unit of weight of 1,000 pounds (usually in engineering contexts).

== See also ==
- Conversion of units
- History of measurement
- Systems of measurement
- Weights and measures
