= Hobbit (unit) =

Obsolete unit of measurement

The hobbit (also hobbett, hobbet, or hobed, from Welsh: hobaid) is a unit of volume or weight formerly used in Wales for trade in grain and other staples. It was equal to two and a half bushels, but was also often used as a unit of weight, which varied depending on the material being measured. The hobbit remained in customary use in markets in northern Wales after Parliament standardized the Winchester bushel as the unit of measure for grain, after which courts gave inconsistent rulings as to its legal status.

== Usage ==
The hobbit was defined as a measure of volume, two and a half imperial bushels, but in practice it was often used as a unit of weight for specific goods. According to George Richard Everitt, Inspector of Corn Returns for Denbigh in northern Wales, when examined by the House of Commons in 1888, grains were sold by the hobbit, measured by weight. A hobbit of oats weighed 105 pounds (48 kg), a hobbit of barley 147 pounds (67 kg), and a hobbit of wheat 168 pounds (76 kg). The figures in hobbits were then converted to standard imperial bushels for official reporting. In addition to grains, there was also a hobbit of beans at 180 pounds (82 kg), and in Flintshire, a 200-pound (91 kg) hobbit of old potatoes, or 210 pounds (95 kg) of new potatoes. Around 1600, Welsh farmland was sometimes denominated by its productive capacity or measure of seedness instead of its physical area, so that in at least one case a plot was registered as "a hobbett of land", that is, large enough to grow one hobbit of grain per year.

Already in 1863, the hobbit was used as an example of the "customary confusion in our British weights and measures". An anonymous contributor to Charles Dickens's journal All the Year Round, arguing in favour of the decimal metric system, noted that

If [I buy wheat] at Wrexham, [I must order] by the hobbet of one hundred and sixty eight [pounds] [76 kg]. But, even if I do happen to know what a hobbet of wheat means at Wrexham, that knowledge good for Flint is not good for Caernarvonshire. A hobbet of wheat at Pwlheli contains eighty-four pounds [38 kg] more than a hobbet at Wrexham; and a hobbet of oats is something altogether different; and a hobbet of barley is something altogether different again.

== Legal issues ==
There was some dispute about the legality of the hobbit as a non-standard measure in commerce after Parliament established the Winchester measure. The hobbit's mixed use as a unit of both volume and of weight complicated the issue, as laws applied to the two cases differently. Courts sometimes nullified grain contracts denominated in hobbits, and sometimes upheld them, according to varying customs in precisely how hobbits were defined and measured.

In 1825, the Exchequer of Pleas heard the case of Tyson v. Thomas, regarding an unfulfilled 1823 contract for the delivery of 20 hobbits of barley in Llanrwst, at 10 shillings each. The price of barley subsequently increased, and the seller did not make delivery. The buyer sued, and the defendant argued that the contract was illegal because it was not based on the standard Winchester bushel. According to testimony, the Llanrwst market used a half-hobbit measure of two 21-imperial-quart (24 L) pecks, but in practice a hobbit could vary from 80 to 84 imperial quarts (91 to 95 L). The court agreed with the seller, finding that the hobbit was impermissible because it was not a fixed integer multiple of the bushel. The contract was therefore void. A similar argument was raised before the Exchequer of Pleas in Owens v. Denton, concerning a sale of malt, but the court held that the question of measures had no effect on the case because the account had already been settled.

The 1852 case Hughes v. Humphreys concerned a contract for the sale of 100 hobbits of wheat at 18 shillings per hobbit. Following custom, the grain was actually delivered in sacks weighed out to 252 pounds (114 kg) each, and converted to 168-pound (76 kg) hobbits. The seller sued to obtain payment from the buyer, who argued that the contract was unenforceable because the hobbit was a non-standard and illegal measure of volume, contrary to Parliamentary establishment of the Winchester bushel for trade in grain. The magistrate at the local assizes in Flintshire, J. Williams, found for the defendant, voiding the contract. This ruling was reversed by the Court of Queen's Bench, which reasoned that, in distinction to the Tyson case, the hobbit in this instance was used as a measure of weight, not volume, and was defined as a fixed multiple of the pound. Because the sale of grain in pounds was allowed, the contract was deemed valid and was enforced.
