= Imperial units =

System of measurements

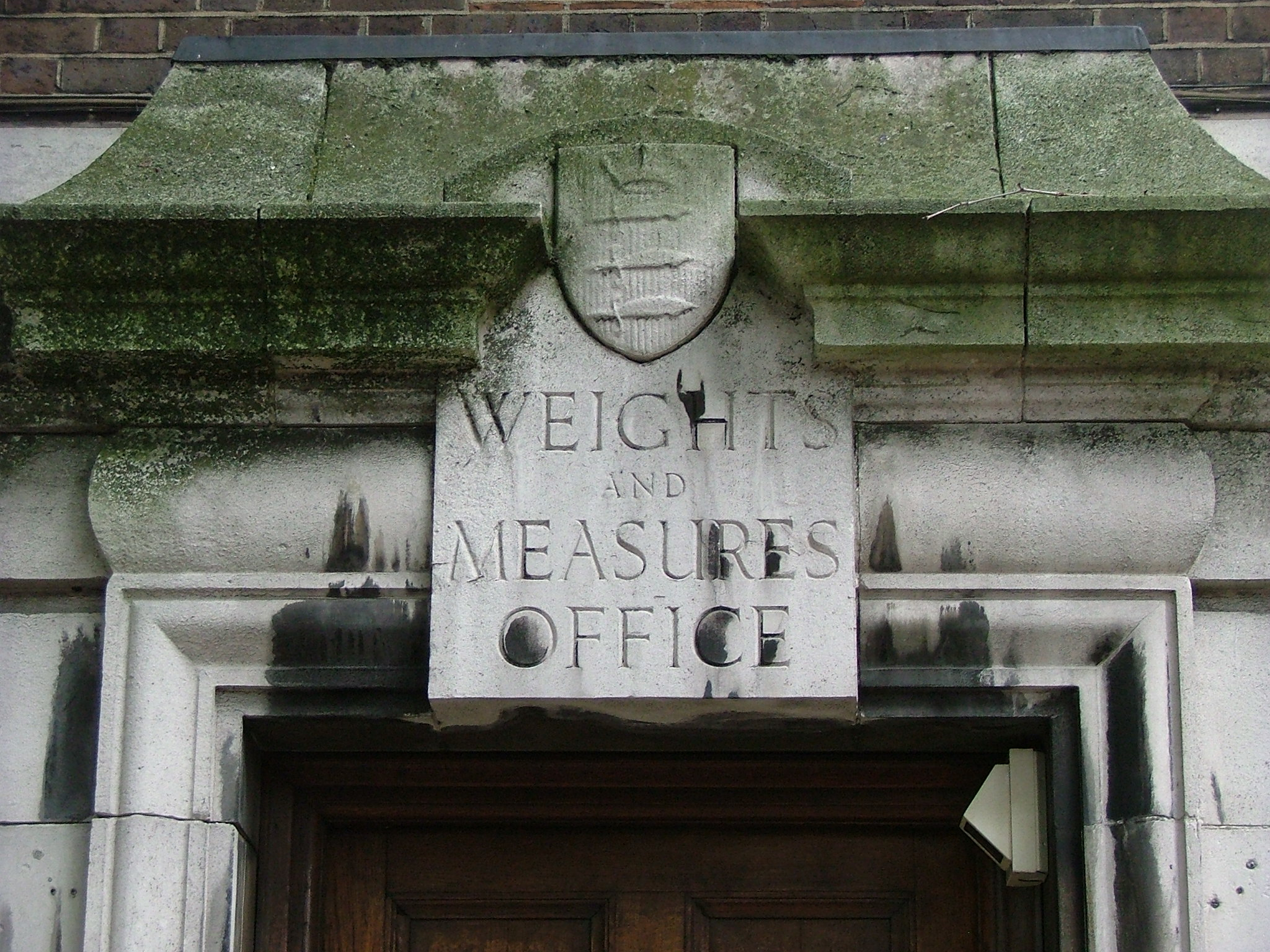
The former Weights and Measures office in Seven Sisters, London (590 Seven Sisters Road)

The imperial system of units, imperial system or imperial units (also known as British Imperial or Exchequer Standards of 1826) is the system of units first defined in the British Weights and Measures Act 1824 and which continued to be developed through a series of Weights and Measures Acts and amendments.

The imperial system developed from earlier English units as did the related but differing system of customary units of the United States. The imperial units replaced the Winchester Standards, which were in effect from 1588 to 1825. The system came into official use across the British Empire in 1826.

By the late 20th century, most nations of the former empire had officially adopted the metric system as their main system of measurement, but imperial units are still used alongside metric units in the United Kingdom and in some other parts of the former empire, notably Canada.

The modern UK legislation defining the imperial system of units is given in the Weights and Measures Act 1985 (as amended).

== Implementation ==
The Weights and Measures Act 1824 was initially scheduled to go into effect on 1 May 1825. The Weights and Measures Act 1825 pushed back the date to 1 January 1826. The 1824 act allowed the continued use of pre-imperial units provided that they were customary, widely known, and clearly marked with imperial equivalents.

=== Apothecaries' units ===
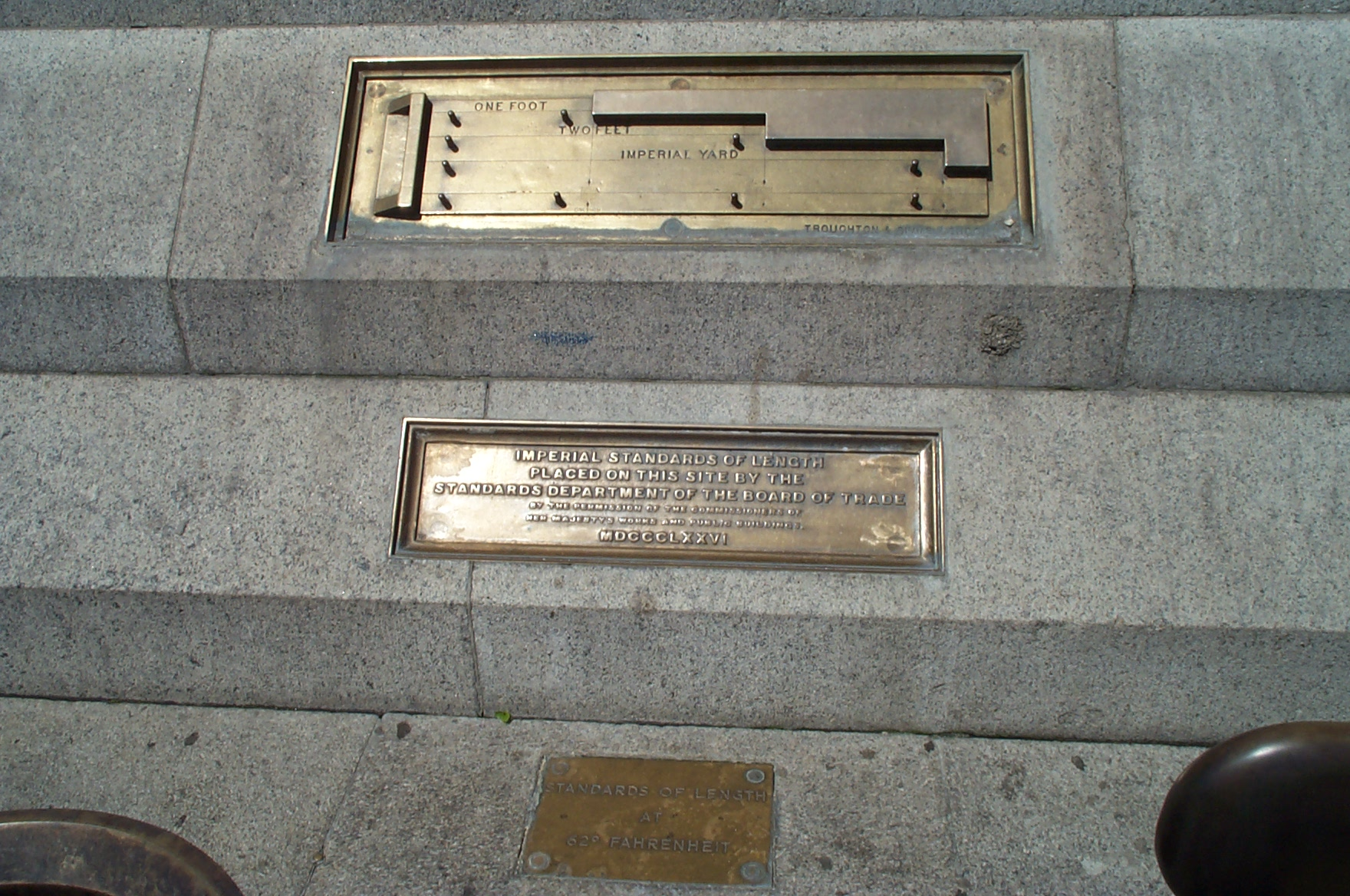
Imperial standards of length 1876 in Trafalgar Square, London

Apothecaries' units are not mentioned in the acts of 1824 and 1825. At the time, apothecaries' weights and measures were regulated "in England, Wales, and Berwick-upon-Tweed" by the London College of Physicians, and in Ireland by the Dublin College of Physicians. In Scotland, apothecaries' units were unofficially regulated by the Edinburgh College of Physicians. The three colleges published, at infrequent intervals, pharmacopoeias, the London and Dublin editions having the force of law.

Imperial apothecaries' measures, based on the imperial pint of 20 fluid ounces, were introduced by the publication of the London Pharmacopoeia of 1836, the Edinburgh Pharmacopoeia of 1839, and the Dublin Pharmacopoeia of 1850. The Medical Act 1858 transferred to the Crown the right to publish the official pharmacopoeia and to regulate apothecaries' weights and measures.

== Units ==
=== Length ===
Metric equivalents in this article usually assume the latest official definition. Previously, the most precise measurement of the imperial Standard Yard was 0.914398415 metres.

Table of length equivalent units
Unit	Abbr. or symbols	Relative to previous	Feet	Metres	Notes
twip			1/17280	0.000017638̅	typographic measure
thou	th	1.44 twip	1/12000	0.0000254	Abbreviation of "thousandth of an inch". Also known as mil.
barleycorn	Bc	333 1/3 th	1/36	0.00846̅	1/3 in
inch	in (″)	3 Bc	1/12	0.0254	1 metre ≡ 39 47/127 inches
hand	hh	4 in	1/3	0.1016	Used to measure the height of horses
foot	ft (′)	3 hh	1	0.3048	12 in
yard	yd	3 ft	3	0.9144	Defined as exactly 0.9144 m by the international yard and pound agreement of 1959
rod	rd	5 1/2 yd	16 1/2	5.0292	The rod is also called pole or perch
furlong	fur	40 rd	660	201.168	220 yd
mile	mi	8 furlongs	5280	1609.344	1760 yd or 80 chains
league	lea	3 miles	15840	4828.032	
Maritime units
fathom	ftm	2.02667 yd	6.0761	1.852	The British Admiralty in practice used a fathom of 6 ft. This was despite its being 1/1000 of a nautical mile (i.e. 6.08 ft) until the adoption of the international nautical mile.
cable		100 fathoms	607.61	185.2	One tenth of a nautical mile. Equal to 100 fathoms under the strict definition.
nautical mile	nmi	10 cables	6076.1	1852	Used for measuring distances at sea (and also in aviation) and approximately equal to one arc minute of a great circle. Until the adoption of the international definition of 1852 m in 1970, the British nautical (Admiralty) mile was defined as 6080 ft.
Gunter's survey units (17th century onwards)
link		1/1000 fur	66/100	0.201168	Decimalization of furlong and acre to facilitate surveying calculations
chain	ch	100 links	66	20.1168	4 rods or 1/10 of a furlong. The distance between the two wickets on a cricket pitch.

=== Area ===
Table of area units and equivalents
Unit	Abbr. or symbol	Relative to previous	Relation to units of length	Square feet	Square yards	Acres	Square metres	Hectares
perch*			1 rd × 1 rd	272 1/4	30 1/4	1/160	25.29285264	0.002529285264
rood		40 perches	1 furlong × 1 rd	10890	1210	1/4	1011.7141056	0.10117141056
acre		4 roods	1 furlong × 1 chain	43560	4840	1	4046.8564224	0.40468564224
square mile	sq mi	640 acres	1 mile × 1 mile	27878400	3097600	640	2589988.110336	258.9988110336
Note: *The square rod has been called a pole or perch or, more properly, square pole or square perch for centuries.

=== Volume ===
Imperial volume units, illustrated as jugs of various sizes

The Weights and Measures Act 1824 invalidated the various different gallons in use in the British Empire, declaring them to be replaced by the statute gallon (which became known as the imperial gallon), a unit close in volume to the ale gallon. The 1824 act defined the volume of a gallon to be that of 10 pounds (4.54 kg) of distilled water weighed in air with brass weights with the barometer standing at 30 inches of mercury (102 kPa) at a temperature of 62 °F (17 °C). The 1824 act went on to give this volume as 277.274 cubic inches (4.54371 litres). The Weights and Measures Act 1963 refined this definition to be the volume of 10 pounds of distilled water of density 0.998859 g/mL weighed in air of density 0.001217 g/mL against weights of density 8.136 g/mL, which works out to 4.546092 L. (Note: 10 pounds = 4535.9237 grams. @ 0.998859 g/mL => 4546.092 mL) The Weights and Measures Act 1985 defined a gallon to be exactly 4.54609 L (approximately 277.4194 cu in).

Table of equivalences
Unit	Imperial ounces	Imperial pints	Millilitres	Cubic inches	US ounces	US pints
fluid ounce (fl oz)	1	1/20	28.4130625	1.7339	0.96076	0.060047
gill (gi)	5	1/4	142.0653125	8.6694	4.8038	0.30024
pint (pt)	20	1	568.26125	34.677	19.215	1.2009
quart (qt)	40	2	1136.5225	69.355	38.430	2.4019
gallon (gal)	160	8	4546.09	277.42	153.72	9.6076
Note: The millilitre equivalences are exact, but cubic-inch and US measures are correct to 5 significant figures.

Unit measures defined by the Weights and Measures Act 1824, all measures determined by reference to the statute gallon of 277.274 cubic inches.
Unit	gallons	Capacity
pint	1/8	34.76 cu in (569.6 mL; 0.5696 L)
quart	1/4	69.32 cu in (1.1360 L)
gallon	1	277.274 cu in (4.54371 L)
peck	2	554.548 cu in (9.08741 L)
bushel	8	2,218.192 cu in (36.34965 L)
quarter	64	17,745.536 cu in (290.79723 L)
Note: The 1824 Act removed the distinction between liquid and dry measure, specifying instead that the dry quantities shall be unheaped. The metric equivalences shown are approximate.

==== British apothecaries' volume measures ====
These measurements were in use from 1826, when the new imperial gallon was defined. For pharmaceutical purposes, they were replaced by the metric system in the United Kingdom on 1 January 1971. In the US, though no longer recommended, the apothecaries' system is still used occasionally in medicine, especially in prescriptions for older medications.

Table of British apothecaries' volume units (Note: References for the Table of British apothecaries' volume units: Unit column; Symbols & abbreviations column; Relative to previous column; Exact metric value column – fluid ounce, pint and gallon, all other values calculated using value for fluid ounce and the Relative to previous column's values.)
Unit	Symbols and abbreviations	Relative to previous	Exact metric value (Note: The vinculum over numbers (e.g. 3̅) represents a repeating decimal.)
minim	♏︎,, m, m., min	(1/9600 pint)	59.1938802083̅ μL
fluid scruple	fl ℈, fl s	20 minims (1/480 pint)	1.18387760416̅ mL
fluid drachm (fluid dram, fluidram)	ʒ, fl ʒ, fʒ, ƒ 3, fl dr	3 fluid scruples (1/160 pint)	3.5516328125 mL
fluid ounce	℥, fl ℥, f℥, ƒ ℥, fl oz	8 fluid drachms	28.4130625 mL
pint	O, pt	20 fluid ounces	568.26125 mL
gallon	C, gal	8 pints	4.54609 L

=== Mass and weight ===
In the 19th and 20th centuries, the UK used three different systems for mass and weight.

- troy weight, used for precious metals;
- avoirdupois weight, used for most other purposes; and
- apothecaries' weight, used by physicians and apothecaries for medical prescriptions

The distinction between mass and weight is not always clearly drawn. Strictly a pound is a unit of mass, but it is commonly referred to as a weight. When a distinction is necessary, the term pound-force may refer to a unit of force rather than mass. The troy pound (373.2417216 g) was made the primary unit of mass by the Weights and Measures Act 1824 and its use was abolished in the UK on 1 January 1879, with only the troy ounce (31.1034768 g) and its decimal subdivisions retained. The Weights and Measures Act 1855 made the avoirdupois pound the primary unit of mass. In all the systems, the fundamental unit is the pound, and all other units are defined as fractions or multiples of it.

Table of mass units
Unit	Pounds	In SI units	Notes
grain (gr)	1/7000	64.79891 mg	Exactly 64.79891 milligrams.
drachm (dr)	1/256	1.7718451953125 g	A dram is 1/16 of an ounce
ounce (oz)	1/16	28.349523125 g	An ounce is 1/16 of a pound
pound (lb)	1	0.45359237 kg	Defined by the Units of Measurement Regulations 1994 (SI 1994/2867)
stone (st)	14	6.35029318 kg	The plural stone is often used when providing a weight (e.g. "this sack weighs 8 stone"). A person's weight is usually quoted in stone and pounds in English-speaking countries that use the avoirdupois system, with the exception of the United States and Canada, where it is usually quoted in pounds.
quarter (qr or qtr)	28	12.70058636 kg	One quarter (literally a quarter of a hundredweight) is equal to two stone or 28 pounds. The term quarter is also used in retail contexts, where it refers to four ounces, i.e. a quarter of a pound. (The 1824 act defined a quarter as a unit of volume, as above: thus a 'quarter of wheat', 64 gallons, would weigh about 494 lb.).
hundredweight (cwt)	112	50.80234544 kg	One imperial hundredweight is equal to eight stone. This is the long hundredweight, 112 pounds, as opposed to the short hundredweight of 100 pounds used in the United States and Canada.
ton (ton)	2240	1016.0469088 kg	Twenty hundredweight equals a ton (as in the US and Canadian systems). The imperial hundredweight is 12% greater than the US and Canadian one. The imperial ton (or long ton) is 2240 pounds, which is much closer to a tonne (about 2204.6 pounds), compared to the 10.7% smaller North American short ton of 2000 pounds (907.185 kg). The symbol "t" is used to denote a tonne.
Gravitational units
slug (slug)	32.17404856	14.59390294 kg	The slug, a unit associated with imperial and US customary systems, is a mass that accelerates by 1 ft/s^{2} when a force of one pound (lbf) is exerted on it.: F / = ma (Newton's second law); 1 lbf / = 1 slug × 1 ft/s^{2} (as defined above); 1 lbf / = 1 lb × g/gc (by definition of the pound force); g / ≈ 32.17404856 ft/s^{2}; gc / ≈ 32.17404856 lbm⋅ft/lbf⋅s^{2}; 1 slug / ≈ 32.17404856 pounds

== Natural equivalents ==
The 1824 Act of Parliament defined the yard, pound and gallon by reference to the prototype standards, naming the prototypes the Imperial Standard Yard, the Imperial Standard Troy Pound and the Imperial Standard Gallon, and it also defined the values of certain physical constants, to make provision for re-creation of the standards if they were to be damaged. For the yard, the length of a pendulum beating seconds at the latitude of Greenwich at mean sea level in vacuo was defined as 39.1393 inches. For the pound, the mass of a cubic inch of distilled water at an atmospheric pressure of 30 inches of mercury and a temperature of 62° Fahrenheit was defined as 252.458 grains, with there being 7,000 grains per pound.

Following the destruction of the original prototypes in the 1834 Houses of Parliament fire, it proved impossible to recreate the standards from these definitions, and a new Weights and Measures Act 1855 was passed which permitted the recreation of the prototypes from recognized secondary standards.

== Current use ==
Countries using the metric (SI), imperial and US customary systems as of 2019

=== United Kingdom ===
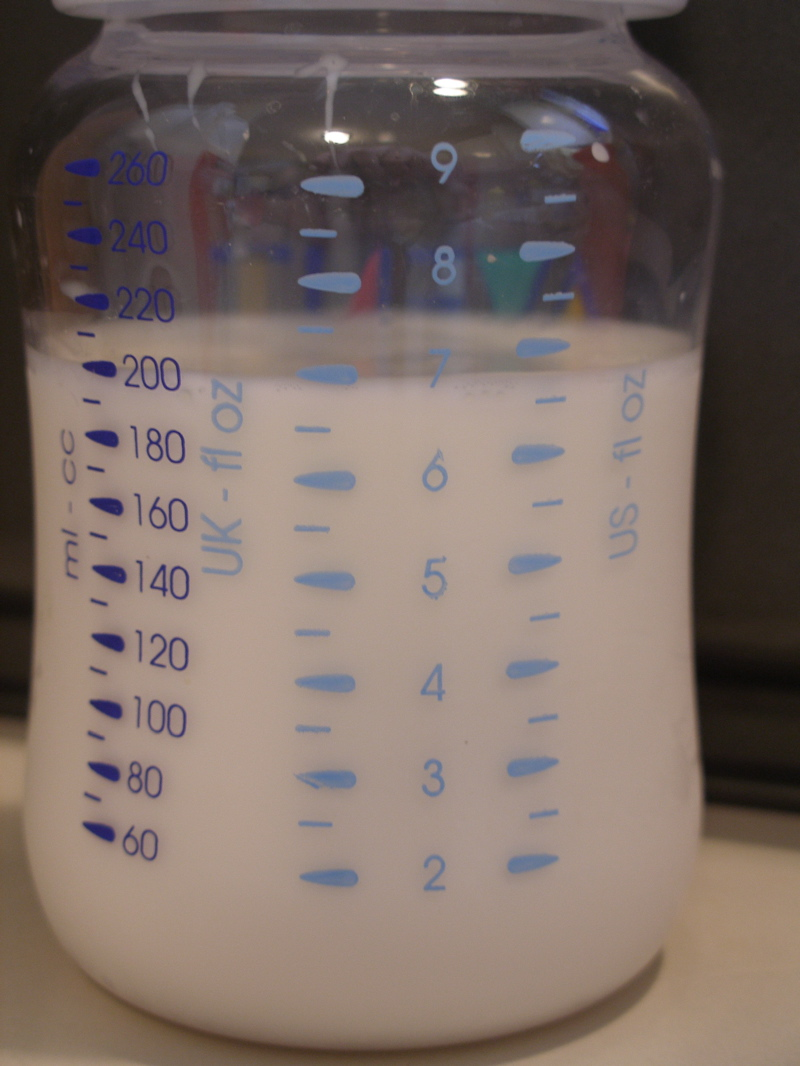
A baby bottle marked in metric, imperial (UK) and US customary units

As of 2026, imperial units remain in everyday use in the United Kingdom. They are used for road distances and speeds, draught beer and cider, personal height and body weight, some sports and property advertising, and many pre-packaged foods are still produced in imperial sizes.

Imperial units are defined in law in terms of their metric equivalents by the Weights and Measures Act 1985. They remain authorised as primary units for road traffic signs and for distance and speed measurement (the mile, yard, foot and inch), for draught beer and cider and milk in returnable containers (the pint), and for transactions in precious metals (the troy ounce). Draught beer and cider must be sold in pints, half-pints or third-pints. Since September 2024, still and sparkling wine may also be sold in pint (568 ml) bottles. In other trade, imperial units may be shown only as supplementary indications alongside metric units and no more prominently. In 2023 the government decided to keep this rule following a public consultation.

Road signs give distances in miles and yards and speed limits in miles per hour. Height and width restriction signs are given in feet and inches, with metric equivalents required on new signs since March 2015. Vehicle speedometers must be able to display miles per hour, and fuel economy is commonly quoted in miles per gallon. Tyre pressures are commonly given in pounds per square inch, usually alongside bar. On the national rail network, locations such as bridges and junctions are identified by their distance in miles and chains from a fixed origin.

Many people use miles, yards, feet and inches for distance and height, and pints for milk and beer. Body weight is widely given in stones and pounds for adults and in pounds and ounces for babies, and NHS material aimed at the public gives weight and height in imperial units as well as metric. A 2015 YouGov survey found that many people did not know their weight or height in both systems, and that people under 40 preferred metric units while those aged 40 and over preferred imperial.

In horse racing, race distances are given in miles, furlongs and yards, and the weights carried by horses in stones and pounds. The height of horses is measured in hands of 4 inches (102 mm). A cricket pitch is 22 yards (20 m) long under the Laws of Cricket, and golf course and hole lengths are given in yards.

Land and property are commonly advertised in acres and square feet. Office rents are quoted per square foot per year. Older gas meters record consumption in cubic feet.

Television and monitor display sizes are given in inches, measured diagonally. Clothing such as trousers and shirt collars is commonly sized in inches. Food sold by length or diameter, such as pizzas and sandwiches, is usually described in inches. Steel pipe is sized in inches, and off-road bicycle frames are measured in inches.

Many pre-packaged foods are produced in imperial quantities but labelled only in metric. A 1 lb (454 g) tin of Lyle's Golden Syrup, for example, is labelled 454 g with no imperial equivalent shown. Jam and marmalade are commonly sold in 340 g (12 oz) and 454 g (1 lb) jars, and many packs of sausages weigh 454 g.

=== India ===
India began converting to the metric system from the imperial system between 1955 and 1962. The metric system in weights and measures was adopted by the Indian Parliament in December 1956 with the Standards of Weights and Measures Act, which took effect beginning 1 October 1958. By 1962, metric units became "mandatory and exclusive."

Today all official measurements are made in the metric system. In common usage some older Indians may still refer to imperial units. Some measurements, such as the heights of mountains, are still recorded in feet. Tyre rim diameters are still measured in inches, as used worldwide. Industries like the construction and the real estate industry still use both the metric and the imperial system though it is more common for sizes of homes to be given in square feet and land in acres.

In Standard Indian English, as in Australian, Canadian, New Zealand, Singaporean, and British English, metric units such as the litre, metre, and tonne utilise the traditional spellings brought over from French, which differ from those used in the United States and the Philippines. The imperial long ton is invariably spelt with one 'n'.

=== Hong Kong ===
Hong Kong has three main systems of units of measurement in current use:

- The Chinese units of measurement of the Qing Empire (no longer in widespread use in China);
- British imperial units; and
- The metric system.

In 1976 the Hong Kong Government started the conversion to the metric system, and as of 2012 measurements for government purposes, such as road signs, are almost always in metric units. All three systems are officially permitted for trade, and in the wider society a mixture of all three systems prevails.

The Chinese system's most commonly used units for length are 里 (lei^{5}), 丈 (zoeng^{6}), 尺 (cek^{3}), 寸 (cyun^{3}), 分 (fan^{1}) in descending scale order. These units are now rarely used in daily life, the imperial and metric systems being preferred. The imperial equivalents are written with the same basic Chinese characters as the Chinese system. In order to distinguish between the units of the two systems, the units can be prefixed with "Ying" (英, jing^{1}) for the imperial system and "Wa" (華, waa^{4}) for the Chinese system. In writing, derived characters are often used, with an additional 口 (mouth) radical to the left of the original Chinese character, for writing imperial units. The most commonly used units are the mile or "li" (哩, li^{1}), the yard or "ma" (碼, maa^{5}), the foot or "chek" (呎, cek^{3}), and the inch or "tsun" (吋, cyun^{3}).

The traditional measure of flat area is the square foot (方呎, 平方呎, fong^{1} cek^{3}, ping^{4} fong^{1} cek^{3}) of the imperial system, which is still in common use for real estate purposes. The measurement of agricultural plots and fields is traditionally conducted in 畝 (mau^{5}) of the Chinese system.

For the measurement of volume, Hong Kong officially uses the metric system, though the gallon (加侖, gaa^{1} leon^{4-2}) is also occasionally used.

=== Canada ===
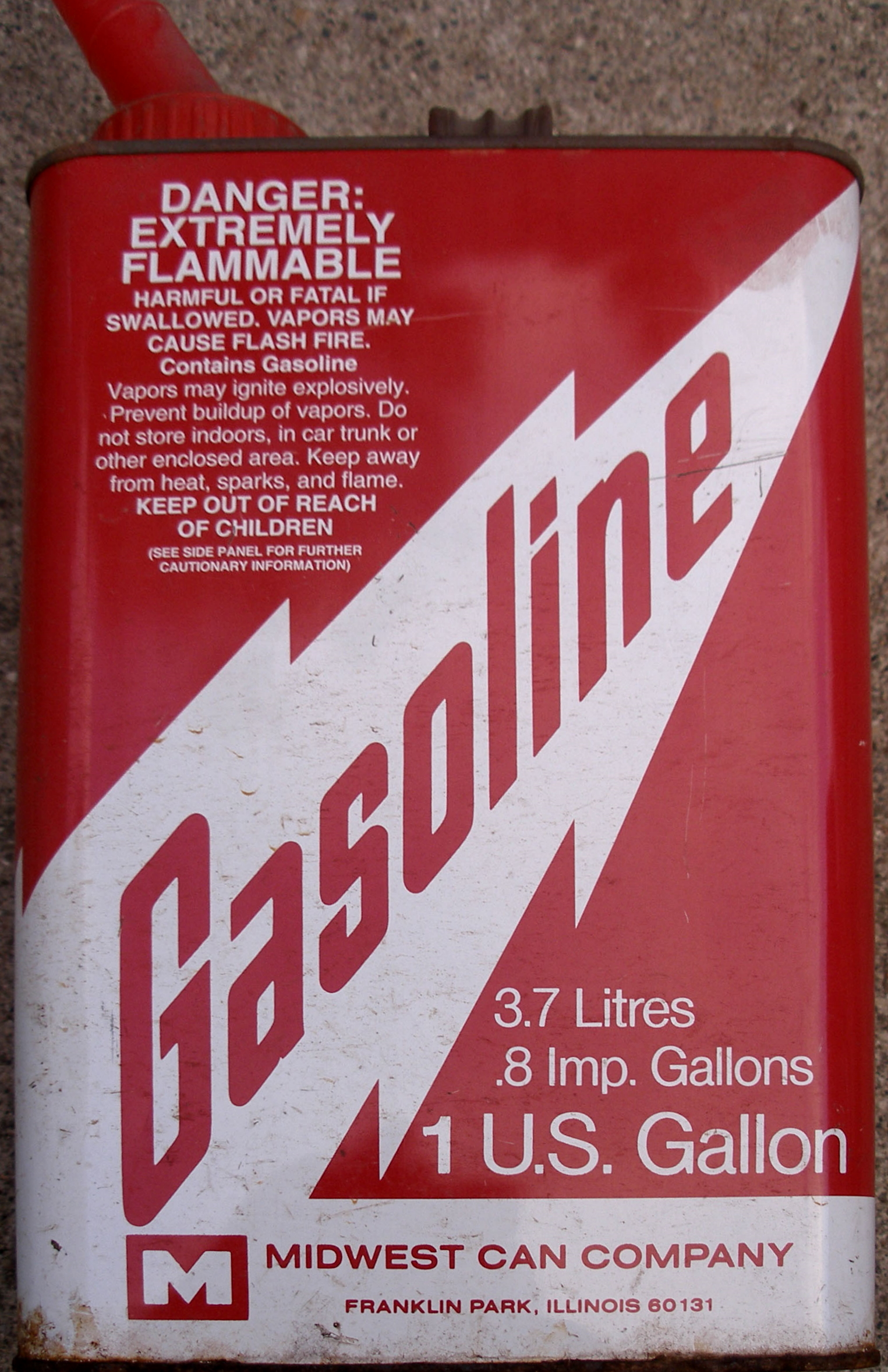
A one US gallon gas can purchased near the US-Canada border showing equivalences in imperial gallons and litres

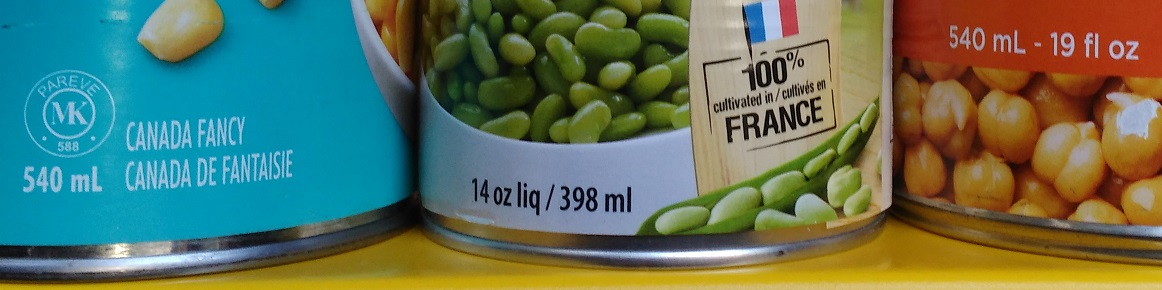
Imperial and metric measurements on Canadian canned goods labels. The imperial measurements often take precedence over the metric ones on labels.

During the 1970s, the metric system and SI units were introduced in Canada to replace the imperial system. Within the government, efforts to implement the metric system were extensive; almost any agency, institution, or function provided by the government uses SI units exclusively. Imperial units were eliminated from all public road signs and both systems of measurement will still be found on privately owned signs, such as the height warnings at the entrance of a parkade. In the 1980s, momentum to fully convert to the metric system stalled when the government of Brian Mulroney was elected. There was heavy opposition to metrication and as a compromise the government maintains legal definitions for and allows use of imperial units as long as metric units are shown as well.

The law requires that measured products (such as fuel and meat) be priced in metric units and an imperial price can be shown if a metric price is present. There tends to be leniency in regards to fruits and vegetables being priced in imperial units only. Environment Canada still offers an imperial unit option beside metric units, even though weather is typically measured and reported in metric units in the Canadian media. Some radio stations near the United States border (such as CIMX and CIDR) primarily use imperial units to report the weather. Railways in Canada also continue to use imperial units.

Imperial units are still used in ordinary conversation. Today, Canadians typically use a mix of metric and imperial measurements in their daily lives. The use of the metric and imperial systems varies by age. The older generation mostly uses the imperial system, while the younger generation more often uses the metric system. Quebec has implemented metrication more fully. Newborns are measured in SI at hospitals, but the birth weight and length is also announced to family and friends in imperial units. Drivers' licences use SI units, though many English-speaking Canadians give their height and weight in imperial. In livestock auction markets, cattle are sold in dollars per hundredweight (short), whereas hogs are sold in dollars per hundred kilograms. Imperial units still dominate in recipes, construction, house renovation and gardening. Land is now surveyed and registered in metric units whilst initial surveys used imperial units. For example, partitioning of farmland on the prairies in the late 19th and early 20th centuries was done in imperial units; this accounts for imperial units of distance and area retaining wide use in the Prairie Provinces.

In English-speaking Canada commercial and residential spaces are mostly (but not exclusively) constructed using square feet, while in French-speaking Quebec commercial and residential spaces are constructed in metres and advertised using both square metres and square feet as equivalents. Carpet or flooring tile is purchased by the square foot, but less frequently also in square metres. Motor-vehicle fuel consumption is reported in both litres per 100 km and statute miles per imperial gallon, leading to the erroneous impression that Canadian vehicles are 20% more fuel-efficient than their apparently identical American counterparts for which fuel economy is reported in statute miles per US gallon (neither country specifies which gallon is used). Canadian railways maintain exclusive use of imperial measurements to describe train length (feet), train height (feet), capacity (tons), speed (mph), and trackage (miles).

Imperial units also retain common use in firearms and ammunition. Imperial measures are still used in the description of cartridge types, even when the cartridge is of relatively recent invention (e.g., .204 Ruger, .17 HMR, where the calibre is expressed in decimal fractions of an inch). Ammunition that is already classified in metric is still kept metric (e.g., 9×19mm). In the manufacture of ammunition, bullet and powder weights are expressed in terms of grains for both metric and imperial cartridges.

In keeping with the international standard, air navigation is based on nautical units, e.g., the nautical mile, which is neither imperial nor metric, and altitude is measured in imperial feet.

=== Australia ===
While metrication in Australia has largely ended the official use of imperial units, for particular measurements, international use of imperial units is still followed.

- In licensed venues, draught beer and cider is sold in glasses and jugs with sizes based on the imperial fluid ounce, though rounded to the nearest 5 mL.
- Newborns are measured in metric at hospitals, but the birth weight and length is sometimes also announced to family and friends in imperial units.
- Screen sizes, are frequently described in inches instead of or as well as centimetres.
- Property size is infrequently described in acres, but is mostly as square metres or hectares.
- Marine navigation is done in nautical miles, and water-based speed limits are in nautical miles per hour.
- Historical writing and presentations may include pre-metric units to reflect the context of the era represented.
- The illicit drug trade in Australia still often uses imperial measurements, particularly when dealing with smaller amounts closer to end user levels e.g. "8-ball" an 8th of an ounce or 3.5 g; cannabis is often traded in ounces ("oz") and pounds ("p")
- Firearm barrel length are almost always referred by in inches, ammunition is also still measured in grains and ounces as well as grams.
- A persons height is frequently and informally described in feet and inches, but on official records is described in metres.

The influence of British and American culture in Australia has been noted to be a cause for residual use of imperial units of measure.

=== New Zealand ===
New Zealand introduced the metric system on 15 December 1976. Aviation was exempt, with altitude and airport elevation continuing to be measured in feet whilst navigation is done in nautical miles; all other aspects (fuel quantity, aircraft weight, runway length, etc.) use metric units.

Screen sizes for devices such as televisions, monitors and phones, and wheel rim sizes for vehicles, are stated in inches, as is the convention in the rest of the world – and a 1992 study found a continued use of imperial units for birth weight and human height alongside metric units.

=== Ireland ===
Ireland has officially changed over to the metric system since entering the European Union, with distances on new road signs being metric since 1997 and speed limits being metric since 2005. The imperial system remains in limited use – for sales of beer in pubs (traditionally sold by the pint). All other goods are required by law to be sold in metric units with traditional quantities being retained for goods like butter and sausages, which are sold in 454 grams (1 lb) packaging. The majority of cars sold pre-2005 feature speedometers with miles per hour as the primary unit, but with a kilometres per hour display. Often signs such as those for bridge height can display both metric and imperial units. Imperial measurements continue to be used colloquially by the general population especially with height and distance measurements such as feet, inches, and acres as well as for weight with pounds and stones still in common use among people of all ages. Measurements such as yards have fallen out of favour with younger generations. Ireland's railways still use imperial measurements for distances and speed signage. Property is usually listed in square feet as well as metres also.

Horse racing in Ireland still continues to use stones, pounds, miles and furlongs as measurements.

=== Bahamas ===
Imperial measurements remain in general use in the Bahamas.

Legally, both the imperial and metric systems are recognised by the Weights and Measures Act 2006.

=== Belize ===
Both imperial units and metric units are used in Belize. Both systems are legally recognized by the National Metrology Act.

=== Myanmar ===
According to the CIA, in June 2009, Myanmar was one of three countries that had not adopted the SI metric system as their official system of weights and measures. Metrication efforts began in 2011. The Burmese government set a goal to metricate by 2019, which was not met, with the help of the German National Metrology Institute.

=== Other countries ===
Some imperial measurements remain in limited use in Malaysia, the Philippines, Sri Lanka and South Africa. Measurements in feet and inches, especially for a person's height, are frequently encountered in conversation and non-governmental publications.

Prior to metrication, it was a common practice in Malaysia for people to refer to unnamed locations and small settlements along major roads by referring to how many miles the said locations were from the nearest major town. In some cases, these eventually became the official names of the locations; in other cases, such names have been largely or completely superseded by new names. An example of the former is Batu 32 (literally "Mile 32" in Malay), which refers to the area surrounding the intersection between Federal Route 22 (the Tamparuli-Sandakan highway) and Federal Route 13 (the Sandakan-Tawau highway). The area is so named because it is 32 miles west of Sandakan, the nearest major town.

Petrol is still sold by the imperial gallon in Anguilla, Antigua and Barbuda, Belize, Myanmar, the Cayman Islands, Dominica, Grenada, Montserrat, St Kitts and Nevis and St. Vincent and the Grenadines. The United Arab Emirates Cabinet in 2009 issued the Decree No. (270 / 3) specifying that, from 1 January 2010, the new unit sale price for petrol will be the litre and not the gallon, which was in line with the UAE Cabinet Decision No. 31 of 2006 on the national system of measurement, which mandates the use of International System of units as a basis for the legal units of measurement in the country. Sierra Leone switched to selling fuel by the litre in May 2011.

In October 2011, the Antigua and Barbuda government announced the re-launch of the Metrication Programme in accordance with the Metrology Act 2007, which established the International System of Units as the legal system of units. The Antigua and Barbuda government has committed to a full conversion from the imperial system by the first quarter of 2015.

In March 2025, Dubai completed the switch from imperial gallons to cubic metres as the unit to measure water consumption.

== See also ==
- Acre-foot
- Board foot
- Comparison of the imperial and US customary measurement systems
- Conversion of units
- Cooking weights and measures
- Cord (volume)
- History of measurement
- Metrication
- Systems of measurement
- Unit of measurement
- £sd (L.s.d.)

== General sources ==
- Appendices B and C of NIST Handbook 44
- Thompson, A.; Taylor, Barry N. (5 October 2010). "The NIST guide for the use of the international system of units". NIST. Archived from the original on 16 February 2010. Also available as a PDF file.
- 6 George IV chapter 12, 1825 (statute)
