= Kokudaka =

System for determining land value in Edo-period Japan

Kokudaka (石高) refers to a system for determining land value for taxation purposes under the Tokugawa shogunate of Edo-period Japan, and expressing this value in terms of koku of rice.

One koku (roughly equivalent to five bushels) was generally viewed as the equivalent of enough rice to feed one person for a year. The actual revenue or income derived from a holding varied from region to region, and depended on the amount of actual control the fief holder held over the territory in question, but averaged around 40 percent of the theoretical kokudaka.

The amount of taxation was not based on the actual quantity of rice harvested, but was an estimate based on the total economic yield of the land in question, with the value of other crops and produce converted to their equivalent value in terms of rice.

The ranking of precedence of the daimyō, or feudal rulers, was determined in part by the kokudaka of the territories under their administration. In 1650, the total kokudaka of Japan was assessed at 26 million koku, with the Shōgun directly controlling 4.2 million koku.

== See also ==
- Han system
