= Winchester measure =

Set of legal standards of volume

Winchester measure is a set of legal standards of volume instituted in the late 15th century (1495) by King Henry VII of England and in use, with some modifications, until the present day. It consists of the Winchester bushel and its dependent quantities, the peck, (dry) gallon and (dry) quart. They would later become known as the Winchester Standards, named because the examples were kept in the city of Winchester.

Winchester measure may also refer to:

- the systems of weights and measures used in the Kingdom of Wessex during the Anglo-Saxon period, later adopted as the national standards of England, as well as the physical standards (prototypes) associated with these systems of units
- a set of avoirdupois weight standards dating to the mid-14th century, in particular, the 56-pound standard commissioned by King Edward III, which served as the prototype for Queen Elizabeth I's reform of the avoirdupois weight system in 1588
- a type of glass bottle, usually amber, used in the drug and chemical industry, known variously as the Boston round, Winchester bottle, or Winchester quart bottle

== History ==
During the 10th century, the capital city of the English king, Edgar, was at Winchester and, at his direction, standards of measurement were instituted. However, nothing is known of these standards except that, following the Norman Conquest, the physical standards (prototypes) were removed to London. In 1496, a law of King Henry VII instituted the bushel that would later come to be known by the name "Winchester". In 1588 Queen Elizabeth I, while reforming the English weight system (which, at the time, included no less than three different pounds going by the name "avoirdupois") based the new Exchequer standard on an ancient set of bronze weights found at Winchester and dating to the reign of Edward III.

These incidents have led to the widespread belief that the Winchester units of dry capacity measure, namely, the bushel and its dependent quantities the peck, gallon and quart, must have originated in the time of King Edgar. However, contemporary scholarship can find no evidence for the existence of any these units in Britain prior to the Norman Conquest. Furthermore, all of the units associated with Winchester measure (quarter, bushel, peck, gallon, pottle, quart, pint) have names of French derivation, at least suggestive of Norman origin.

=== Capacity measures in the Anglo-Saxon period ===
Prior to the Norman Conquest, the following units of capacity measure were used: sester, amber, mitta, coomb, and seam. A statute of 1196 (9 Ric. 1. c. 27) decreed: It is established that all measures of the whole of England be of the same amount, as well of corn as of vegetables and of like things, to wit, one good horse load; and that this measure be level as well in cities and boroughs as without. This appears to be a description of the seam, which would later be equated with the quarter. The word seam is of Latin derivation (from the Vulgar Latin sauma = packsaddle). Some of the other units are likewise of Latin derivation, sester from sextarius, amber from amphora. The sester could thus be taken as roughly a pint, the amber a bushel. However, the values of these units, as well as their relationships to one another, varied considerably over the centuries so that no clear definitions are possible except by specifying the time and place in which the units were used.

=== After the Norman Conquest ===
One of the earliest documents defining the gallon, bushel and quarter is the Assize of Weights and Measures, also known as the Tractatus de Ponderibus et Mensuris, sometimes attributed to Henry III or Edward I, but nowadays generally listed under Ancient Statutes of Uncertain Date and presumed to be from c. 1250−1305. It states, By Consent of the whole Realm the King’s Measure was made, so that an English Penny, which is called the Sterling, round without clipping, shall weigh Thirty-two Grains of Wheat dry in the midst of the Ear; Twenty-pence make an Ounce; and Twelve Ounces make a Pound, and Eight Pounds make a Gallon of Wine; and Eight Gallons of Wine make a Bushel of London; which is the Eighth Part of a Quarter.

In 1496, An Act for Weights and Measures (12 Hen. 7. c. 5) stated That the Measure of a Bushel contain viij. Gallons of Wheat, and that every Gallon contain viij. li. of Wheat of Troy Weight, and every Pound contain xij. Ounces of Troy Weight, and every Ounce contain xx. Sterlings, and every Sterling be of the Weight of xxxij. Corns of Wheat that grew in the Midst of the Ear of Wheat, according to the old Laws of this Land. Even though this bushel does not quite fit the description of the Winchester bushel, the national standard prototype bushel constructed the following year (and still in existence) is near enough to a Winchester bushel that it is generally considered the first, even though it was not known by that name at the time.

The Winchester bushel is first mentioned by name in a statute of 1670 entitled An Act for ascertaining the Measures of Corn and Salt (22 Cha. 2. c. 8) which states, And that if any person or persons after the time aforesaid shall sell any sort of corn or grain, ground or unground, or any kind of salt, usually sold by the bushel, either in open market, or any other place, by any other bushel or measure than that which is agreeable to the standard, marked in his Majesty's exchequer, commonly called the Winchester measure, containing eight gallons to the bushel, and no more or less, and the said bushel strucken even by the wood or brim of the same by the seller, and sealed as this act directs, he or they shall forfeit for every such offence the sum of forty shillings.

It is first defined in law by a statute of 1696–97 (8 & 9 Will. 3. c. 22 ss. 9 & 45) And to the End all His Majesties Subjects may know the Content of the Winchester Bushell whereunto this Act refers, and that all Disputes and Differences about Measure may be prevented for the future, it is hereby declared that every round Bushel with a plain and even Bottom, being Eighteen Inches and a Halfe wide throughout, & Eight Inches deep, shall be esteemed a legal Winchester Bushel according to the Standard in His Majesty's Exchequer.

In 1824 a new Act was passed in which the gallon was defined as the volume of ten pounds of pure water at 62 °F (17 °C) with the other units of volume changing accordingly. The "Winchester bushel", which was some 3% smaller than the new bushel (eight new gallons), was retained in the English grain trade until formally abolished in 1835. In 1836, the United States Department of the Treasury formally adopted the Winchester bushel as the standard for dealing in grain and, defined as 2,150.42 cubic inches, it remains so today.

While the United Kingdom and the British Colonies changed to "Imperial" measures in 1826, the US continued to use Winchester measures and still does.

== Measures in the city museum ==
None of Edgar's standard measures, which were probably made of wood, remain, but the city's copy of the standard yard, although stamped with the official mark of Elizabeth I, may date from the early twelfth century, during the reign of Henry I. Preserved standard weights date from 1357, and although the original bushel is lost, a standard bushel, gallon and quart made of bronze, issued in 1497 and stamped with the mark of Henry VII are still held.

== See also ==
- History of measurement
- Boston round
