= Coomb (unit) =

Measure of volume

A coomb is a measure of volume. Its exact original details are not known. In 13th century England it was defined as 4 bushels (~140 L). It was in use in Norfolk as a dry measure: "Ben sold my Wheat to the Marlingford Miller this Morning for 19 shillings per Coomb" – Parson Woodforde's Diary, 20 May 1786. The 4-bushel bag was the standard international shipping unit for grain, and the coomb was in common use in farming in Norfolk and Suffolk until well after the end of World War II, in fact for as long as grain was handled in sacks, a practice which ended with the introduction of combine harvesters which had bulk grain tanks.

Yields were referred to in coombs per acre. A coomb was 16 stone (100 kg) for barley and 18 stone (110 kg) for wheat. The US grain markets quote prices as cents per bushel, and a US bushel of grain is about 61 lb (28 kg), which would approximately correspond to the 4-bushel coomb (4 × 61 lb = 244 lb ≈ 111 kg).

== See also ==
- List of non-coherent units of measurement
