= History of measurement =

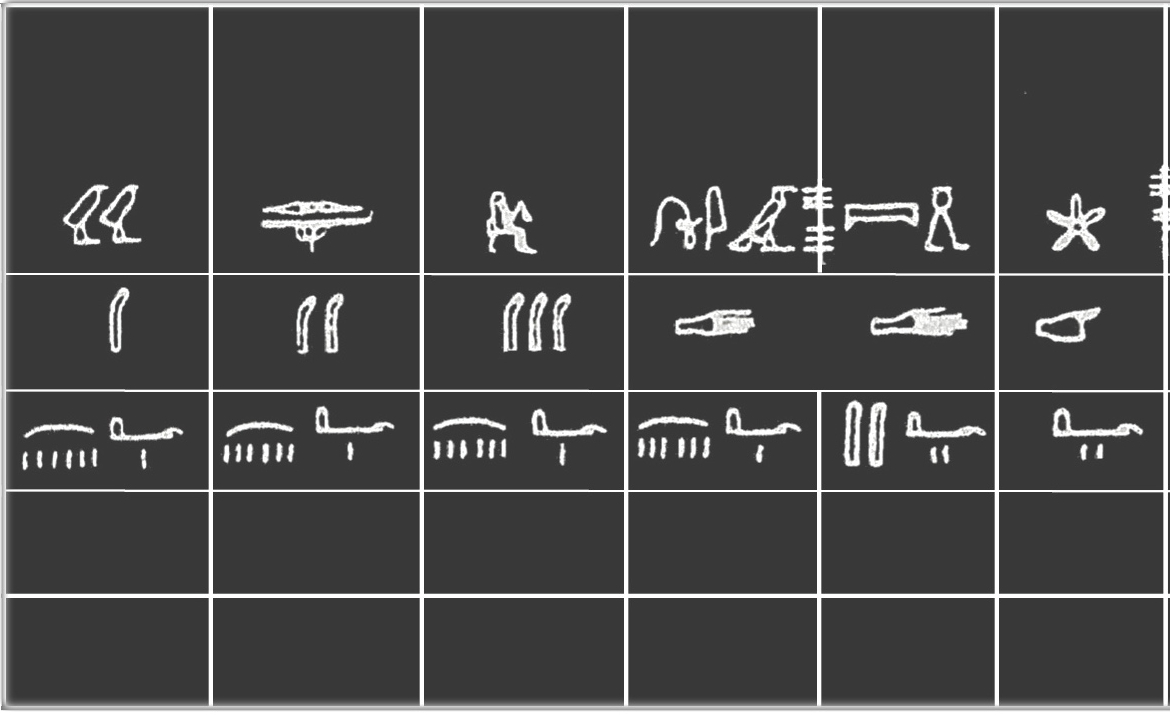
Detail of a cubit rod in the Museo Egizio (Egyptian Museum) of Turin

The earliest recorded systems of weights and measures originate in the 3rd or 4th millennium BC.

== History of units ==
=== Units of length ===
Before the establishment of the decimal metric system in France during the French Revolution in the late 18th century, many units of length were based on parts of the human body. The Nippur cubit was one of the oldest known units of length. The oldest known metal standard for length corresponds to this Sumerian unit and dates from 2650 BCE. This copper bar was discovered in Nippur, on the banks of the Euphrates, and is kept in the Istanbul Archaeological Museum. Archaeologists consider that this 51.85 centimetres long unit was the origin of the Roman foot. Indeed, the Egyptians divided the Sumerian cubit into 28 fingers and 16 of these fingers gave a Roman foot of 29.633 cm.

=== Units of mass ===
The grain was the earliest unit of mass and is the smallest unit in the apothecary, avoirdupois, Tower, and troy systems. The early unit was a grain of wheat or barleycorn used to weigh the precious metals silver and gold. Larger units preserved in stone standards were developed that were used as both units of mass and of monetary currency. The pound was derived from the mina (unit) used by ancient civilizations. A smaller unit was the shekel, and a larger unit was the talent. The magnitude of these units varied from place to place. The Babylonians and Sumerians had a system in which there were 60 shekels in a mina and 60 minas in a talent. The Roman talent consisted of 100 libra (pound) which were smaller in magnitude than the mina. The troy pound (~373.2 g) used in England and the United States for monetary purposes, like the Roman pound, was divided into 12 ounces, but the Roman uncia (ounce) was smaller. The carat is a unit for measuring gemstones that had its origin in the carob seed, which later was standardized at 1/144 ounce and then 0.2 gram.

Goods of commerce were originally traded by number or volume. When weighing of goods began, units of mass based on a volume of grain or water were developed. The diverse magnitudes of units having the same name, which still appear today in our dry and liquid measures, could have arisen from the various commodities traded. The larger avoirdupois pound for goods of commerce might have been based on volume of water which has a higher bulk density than grain.

The stone, quarter, hundredweight, and ton were larger units of mass used in Britain. Today only the stone continues in customary use for measuring personal body weight. The present stone is 14 pounds (~6.35 kg), but an earlier unit appears to have been 16 pounds (~7.25 kg). The other units were multiples of 2, 8, and 160 times the stone, or 28, 112, and 2240 pounds (~12.7 kg, 50.8 kg, 1016 kg), respectively. The hundredweight was approximately equal to two talents. The "long ton" is equal to 2240 pounds (1016.047 kg), the "short ton" is equal to 2000 pounds (907.18474 kg), and the tonne (or metric ton) (t) is equal to 1000 kg (or 1 megagram).

=== Units of time and angle ===
The division of the circle into 360 degrees and the day into hours, minutes, and seconds can be traced to the Babylonians who had a sexagesimal system of numbers. The 360 degrees may have been related to a year of 360 days. Many other systems of measurement divided the day differently—counting hours, decimal time, etc. Other calendars divided the year differently.

== Forerunners of the metric system ==
Decimal numbers are an essential part of the metric system, with only one base unit and multiples created on the decimal base, the figures remain the same. This simplifies calculations. Although the Indians used decimal numbers for mathematical computations, it was Simon Stevin who in 1585 first advocated the use of decimal numbers for everyday purposes in his booklet De Thiende (old Dutch for 'the tenth'). He also declared that it would only be a matter of time before decimal numbers were used for currencies and measurements. His notation for decimal fractions was clumsy, but this was overcome with the introduction of the decimal point, generally attributed to Bartholomaeus Pitiscus who used this notation in his trigonometrical tables (1595).

In 1670, Gabriel Mouton published a proposal that was in essence similar to John Wilkins' proposal for a universal measure, except that his base unit of length would have been 1/1000 of a minute of arc (about 1.852 m) of geographical latitude. He proposed calling this unit the virga. Rather than using different names for each unit of length, he proposed a series of names that had prefixes, rather like the prefixes found in SI.

In 1790, Thomas Jefferson submitted a report to the United States Congress in which he proposed the adoption of a decimal system of coinage and of weights and measures. He proposed calling his base unit of length a "foot" which he suggested should be either 3/10 or 1/3 of the length of a pendulum that had a period of one second—that is 3/10 or 1/3 of the "standard" proposed by John Wilkins over a century previously. This would have equated to 11.755 English inches (29.8 cm) or 13.06 English inches (33.1 cm). Like Wilkins, the names that he proposed for multiples and subunits of his base units of measure were the names of units of measure that were in use at the time. The great interest in geodesy during this era, and the measurement system ideas that developed, influenced how the continental US was surveyed and parceled. The story of how Jefferson's full vision for the new measurement system came close to displacing the Gunter chain and the traditional acre, but ended up not doing so, is explored in Andro Linklater's Measuring America.

== Metric conversion ==
The metric system was first described in 1668 and officially adopted by France in 1799. Over the 19th and 20th centuries, it became the dominant system worldwide, although several countries, including the United States, China, and the United Kingdom continue to use their customary units, such as the mile. Among the numerous customary systems, many have been adapted to become an integer multiple of a related metric unit: The Scandinavian mile is now defined as 10 km, the Chinese jin is now defined as 0.5 kg, and the Dutch ons is now defined as 100 g.

== See also ==
- Historical metrology
- Metrication
