= Dry gallon =

Defunct unit of dry weight

The dry gallon, also known as the corn gallon or grain gallon, is a historic British dry measure of volume that was used to measure grain and other dry commodities and whose earliest recorded official definition, in 1303, was the volume of 8 pounds (3.6 kg) of wheat.

It is no longer used in the US customary system, and is no longer included in the National Institute of Standards and Technology handbook that many US states recognize as the authority on measurement law: however, it implicitly exists since the US dry measures of bushel, peck, quart and pint are still in use.

The US fluid gallon is exactly 15121/107521 smaller than the US dry gallon, while the imperial gallon is about 3.21% larger than the US dry gallon.

The dry gallon's implicit value in the US system was originally one-eighth of the Winchester bushel, which was a cylindrical measure of 18.5 inches (469.9 mm) in diameter and 8 inches (203.2 mm) in depth, making it an irrational number of cubic inches; its value to seven significant digits was 268.8025 cubic inches (4.404884 litres), from an exact value of 9.25^{2} × π cubic inches.

Since the bushel was later redefined to be exactly 2150.42 cubic inches, 268.8025 became the exact value for the dry gallon, with 268.8025 cubic inches being 4.40488377086 L.
