= Apothecaries' system =

Historical system of mass and volume units used by physicians and apothecaries

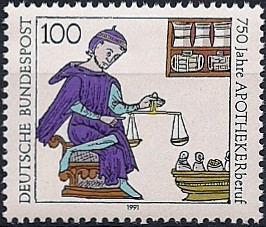
German postage stamp from 1991, commemorating 750 years of the apothecary profession

The apothecaries' system, or apothecaries' weights and measures, is a historical system of mass and volume units that were used by physicians and apothecaries for medical prescriptions, and also sometimes by scientists. The English version of the system is closely related to the English troy system of weights, the pound and grain being exactly the same in both. It divides a pound into 12 ounces, an ounce into 8 drachms, and a drachm into 3 scruples of 20 grains each. This exact form of the system was used in the United Kingdom; in some of its former colonies, it survived well into the 20th century. The apothecaries' system of measures is a similar system of volume units based on the fluid ounce. For a long time, medical recipes were written in Latin, often using special symbols to denote weights and measures.

The use of different measure and weight systems depending on the purpose was an almost universal phenomenon in Europe between the decline of the Roman Empire and metrication. This was connected with international commerce, especially with the need to use the standards of the target market and to compensate for a common weighing practice that caused a difference between actual and nominal weight. In the 19th century, most European countries or cities still had at least a "commercial" or "civil" system (such as the English avoirdupois system) for general trading, and a second system (such as the troy system) for precious metals such as gold and silver. The system for precious metals was usually divided in a different way from the commercial system, often using special units such as the carat. More significantly, it was often based on different weight standards.

The apothecaries' system often used the same ounces as the precious metals system, although even then the number of ounces in a pound could be different. The apothecaries' pound was divided into its own special units, which were inherited (via influential treatises of Greek physicians such as Dioscorides and Galen, 1st and 2nd century) from the general-purpose weight system of the Romans. Where the apothecaries' weights and the normal commercial weights were different, it was not always clear which of the two systems was used in trade between merchants and apothecaries, or by which system apothecaries weighed medicine when they actually sold it. In old merchants' handbooks, the former system is sometimes referred to as the pharmaceutical system and distinguished from the apothecaries' system.

== English-speaking countries ==
=== Weight ===
British Apothecaries' weights and conversions (Traditional troy-based version)
Weight (symbol)	Pound (℔, ″̶)	Ounce (℥)	Dram (drachm) (ʒ)	Scruple (℈)	Grain (gr)
	1 ℔	12 ℥	96 ʒ	288 ℈	5,760 gr.
		1 ℥	8 ʒ	24 ℈	480 gr.
			1 ʒ	3 ℈	60 gr.
				1 ℈	20 gr.
In metric	373.3 g	31.1 g	3.89 g	1.296 g	64.8 mg

Proposed avoirdupois-based apothecaries' system, Dublin 1850
Pound (℔	Ounce (℥)	Drachm (ʒ)	Scruple (℈)	Grain (gr)
1 ℔	16 ℥	128 ʒ	384 ℈	7,000.00 gr.
	1 ℥	8 ʒ	24 ℈	437.50 gr.
		1 ʒ	3 ℈	54.68 gr.
			1 ℈	18.22 gr.
453.6 g	28.3 g	3.5 g	1.2 g	64.8 mg

British Apothecaries' weights and conversions (avoirdupois version, 1864–1971)
Weight (symbol)	Pound (lb.)	Ounce (oz.)	Grain (gr.)
	1 lb.	16 oz.	7,000 gr.
		1 oz.	437.5 gr.
In metric	453.6 g	28.3 g	64.8 mg

From pound down to the scruple, the units of the traditional English apothecaries' system were a subset of the units of the Roman weight system, although the troy pound and its subdivisions were slightly heavier than the Roman pound and its subdivisions. Similar systems were used all over Europe, but with considerable local variation described below under Variants. The traditional English apothecaries' system of weights is shown in the first table in this section: the pound, ounce and grain were identical to the troy pound, ounce and grain (also used to measure weights of precious metals; distinct from the avoirdupois pounds and ounces that were used for measurements of other goods.) The confusing variety of definitions and conversions for pounds and ounces is covered elsewhere in a table of pound definitions.

The Irish pharmacopœia of 1850 rejected the use of the troy pound and instead adopted the use in its formulae of the avoirdupois pound, divided into 16 avoirdupois ounces, with the avoirdupois ounce subdivided into eight drachms, each of three scruples. This innovation was intended to unify the units used by apothecaries for sale with the avoirdupois units that they used for purchase, and that were used by other professions such as manufacturing chemists. To allow effective use of the new system, new weight pieces were produced. Since an avoirdupois ounce corresponds to 28.35 g, the proposed system was very similar to that in use in Portugal and Spain, and in some locations in Italy. But it would have doubled the value of the avoirdupois drachm (an existing unit, but by then only used for weighing silk). Therefore, it conflicted with other non-standard variations that were based on that nearly obsolete unit.

The Irish proposal was not widely adopted, but British legislation, in the form of the Medical Act 1858 (21 & 22 Vict. c. 90), was more radical: it prescribed the use of the avoirdupois system for the United Kingdom (then including Ireland), with none of the traditional subdivisions. This innovation was first used in the United British pharmacopœia of 1864, which recommended the adoption in pharmacy of the imperial avoirdupois pound of 7000 grains and ounce of 437.5 grains, and discontinuation of the drachm and scruple. In practice, however, the old apothecaries' system based on divisions of the troy pound, or of the troy ounce of 480 grains, was still widely used until it was abolished by the Weights and Measures Act 1976 (c. 77), since when it may only be used to measure precious metals and stones. (The troy pound had already been declared illegal for most other uses by the Weights and Measures Act 1878 (41 & 42 Vict. c. 49), but this act allowed the sale of drugs by apothecaries' weight as an exception.)

Apothecaries' units of any kind became obsolete in the UK with the mandatory use of metric drug measurements from January 1, 1971.

In the United States, the apothecaries' system remained official until it was abolished in 1971 in favour of the metric system.

=== Volume ===
Measures: U.S. (& U.K. 1809–1864)
Pint	Fluid ounce	Fluid dram	Fluid scruple	Minim
1 pt.	16 ƒ℥	128 ƒʒ	384 ƒ℈	7,680 ♏︎
	1 ƒ℥	8 ƒʒ	24 ƒ℈	480 ♏︎
		1 ƒʒ	3 ƒ℈	60 ♏︎
			1 ƒ℈	20 ♏︎
473 mL	29.6 mL	3.70 mL	1.23 mL	0.0616 mL
Key: pt. = pint

Measures: U.K. (Imperial; 1864–1971)
Imperial gallon	Imperial pint	Fluid ounce	Fluid drachm	Minim
1 C	8 O	160 fl. oz.	1280 fl. dr.	38,400 min.
	1 O	20 fl. oz.	160 fl. dr.	9,600 min.
		1 fl. oz.	8 fl. dr.	480 min.
			1 fl. dr.	60 min.
				20 min.
4546 mL	568 mL	28.4 mL	3.55 mL	0.059 mL
Key: C = congius (gallon); O = octarius or octavius (pint)

English-speaking countries also used a system of units of fluid measure, or in modern terminology volume units, based on the apothecaries' system. Originally, the terms and symbols used to describe the volume measurements of liquids were the same as or similar to those used to describe weight measurements of solids (for example, the pound by weight and the fluid pint were both referred to with Latin libra, symbol ℔). A volume of liquid that was approximately that of an apothecaries' ounce of water was called a fluid ounce, and was divided into fluid drachms and sometimes also fluid scruples. The smallest unit of liquid volume was traditionally a drop (Latin gutta). Although nominally defined as a sixtieth of the fluid drachm, in practice the drop was a not a standardized unit of volume but was measured by means of releasing literal drops of liquid from the lip of a bottle or vial.

The 1809 London Pharmacopoeia introduced modified terminology for apothecaries' measurements of liquid volume. New terms and symbols introduced by the London College of Physicians (octarius, minim) were subsequently adopted by the Pharmacopoeias of the United States and Dublin. The pint was given the Latin name octarius and represented by the symbol O, thus distinguishing its Latin name and symbol from that of the pound. The terms for fluid ounce and fluid drachm were distinguished from weight measures by the prefix fluid- (Latin Fluiduncia, Fluidrachma, English fluidounce and fluidrachm) or in abbreviations by the prefixed letter f (f℥, fʒ). (However, even in the 20th century the f of the symbols f℥, fʒ was sometimes omitted by physicians in the United States, with fluid ounces and fluid drams represented instead simply by the symbols ℥, ʒ.) The smallest unit of volume was standardized as precisely a sixtieth of a fluidrachm (1/61,440 of a wine gallon) and given the name minim. (Subsequently, the old term drop was sometimes viewed as an approximate equivalent of the new minim, based on their nominally equivalent definitions. In fact, the units were qualitatively different because the traditional drop, by the nature of how it was measured, did not actually correspond to a single definite volume.) Along with the new name of minim, the London Pharmacopoeia of 1809 prescribed a new method of measuring the smallest unit of volume using a graduated glass tube.

Before introduction of the imperial units in the U.K., all apothecaries' fluid measures were based on the unit of the wine gallon, which survived in the US under the name liquid gallon or wet gallon. The wine gallon was abolished in Britain in 1826, and this system was replaced by a new one based on the newly introduced imperial gallon. Since the imperial gallon is 20% more than the liquid gallon, the same is true for the imperial pint in relation to the liquid pint. Accordingly, in the new imperial system, the number of fluid ounces per pint was adjusted from 16 to 20 so that the fluid ounce was not changed too much by the reform. Even so, the modern U.K. fluid ounce is 4% less than the US fluid ounce, and the same is true for the smaller units. For some years both systems were used concurrently in the U.K.

As a result, the Imperial and U.S. systems differ in the size of the basic unit (the gallon or the pint, one gallon being equal to eight pints), and in the number of fluid ounces per pint.

Apothecaries' systems for volumes were internationally much less common than those for weights.

There were also commonly used, but unofficial divisions of the Apothecaries' system, consisting of:

- Glass-tumbler 8 fl. oz.
- Breakfast-cup about 8 fl. oz.
- Tea-cup 5 fl. oz.
- Wine-glass 2 fl. oz.
- Table-spoon 1/2 fl. oz.
- Dessert-spoon 2 fl. dr. (same as 1/4 fl. oz.)
- Tea-spoon 1 fl. dr. (same as 1/8 fl. oz.)

In the United States, similar measures in use were once:

- Tumblerful — ƒ℥ viii (8 fl oz / 1 cup / 240 mL)
- Teacupful — ƒ℥ iv (4 fl oz / 1 gill / 120 mL)
- Wineglassful — ƒ℥ ij (2 fl oz / 60 mL)
- Tablespoonful — ƒ℥ ss (1/2 fl oz / 3 tsp / 1 Tbsp; 15 mL as once codified in the ninth edition of the United States Pharmacopeia (U.S.P. IX))
- Dessertspoonful — ƒʒ ij (≡ ƒ℈ viij or 2 2/3ƒʒ / 2 tsp; 10 mL as once codified in the U.S.P. IX) (Note: Historic vs current values)
- Teaspoonful — ƒʒ j (≡ ƒ℈ iv or 1 1/3ƒʒ / 1 tsp; 5 mL as once codified in the U.S.P. IX)

Remington's Pharmaceutical Sciences states: "In almost all cases the modern teacups, tablespoons, dessertspoons, and teaspoons, after careful test by the author, were found to average 25 percent greater capacity than the theoretical quantities given above, and thus the use of accurately graduated medicine glasses, which may be had now at a trifling cost, should be insisted upon."

Apothecaries' measures eventually fell out of use in the U.K. and were officially abolished in 1971. In the U.S., they are still occasionally used, for example with prescribed medicine being sold in four-ounce (℥ iv) bottles.

== Medical prescriptions ==
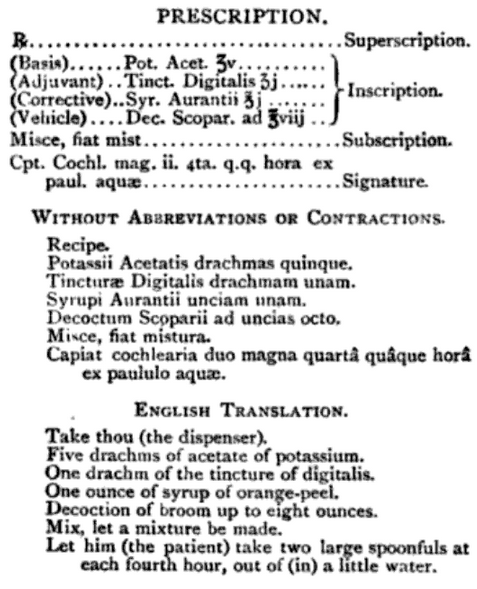
An example of a prescription in Latin and its English translation, from 1907.

Until around 1900, medical prescriptions and most European pharmacopoeias were written in Latin. Here is a typical example from the middle of the 19th century.

Infusion of Dandelion, &c.
Rx	Infusi Taraxaci, f℥iv.	4 fluid ounces of dandelion infusion
	Extracti Taraxaci, fʒij.	2 fluid drachms of dandelion extract
	Sodæ Carbonatis, ʒss.	1/2 drachm of sodium carbonate
	Potassæ Tartratis, ʒiij.	3 drachms of potassium tartrate
	Tincturæ Rhei, fʒiij.	3 fluid drachms of rhubarb tincture
	———— Hyoscyami, gtt. xx.	20 drops of henbane tincture
Fiat Mistura. Signa.—One-third part to be taken three times a day. In dropsical and visceral affections.		Make mixture. Write: "One-third part to be taken three times a day. In dropsical and visceral affections."

The letters "ss" are an abbreviation for the Latin "semis" meaning "half", which were sometimes written with a ß. In Apothecaries' Latin, numbers were generally written in Roman numerals, immediately following the symbol. Since only the units of the apothecaries' system were used in this way, this made it clear that the civil weight system was not meant.

== Variants ==
=== Diversity of local standards ===
Variation in standards for apothecaries' weights
12 ounces	1 ounce	Standard
300 g	25 g	Venice
325 g	27 g	Roman Empire
340 g	28 g	Early modern Rome
345 g	29 g	Iberian Peninsula
350 g	29 g	Prussia
360 g	30 g	Nuremberg
370 g	31 g	Troy
420 g	35 g	Habsburg monarchy

The basic form of the apothecaries' system is essentially a subset of the Roman weight system. An apothecaries' pound normally consisted of 12 ounces. (In France this was changed to 16 ounces, and in Spain, the customary unit was the marco, a mark of 8 ounces.) In the south of Europe and in France, the scruple was generally divided into 24 grains, so that one ounce consisted of 576 grains. Nevertheless, the subdivision of an ounce was somewhat more uniform than that of a pound, and a common feature of all variants is that 12 ounces are roughly 100 drachms (96–128 drachms) and a grain is roughly the weight of a physical grain.

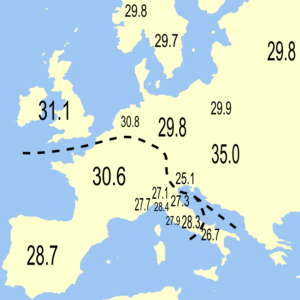
Map showing examples of the weight of 1 apothecaries' ounce in grammes around 1800, before metrication and the Prussian weight reform. The dashed lines indicate three different ways to subdivide the ounce.

It is most convenient to compare the various local weight standards by the metric weights of their ounces. The actual mass of an ounce varied by ±17% (5 g) around the typical value of 30 g. The table only shows approximate values for the most important standards; even the same nominal standard could vary slightly between one city and its neighbour. The range from 25 g to 31 g is filled with numerous variants, especially the Italian range up to 28 g. But there is a relatively large gap between the troy ounces of 31 g and the Habsburg ounce of 35 g. The latter is the product of an 18th-century weight reform.

Even in Turkey a system of weights similar to the European apothecaries' system was used for the same purpose. For medical purposes the tcheky (approx. 320 g) was divided in 100 drachms, and the drachm in (16 kilos or) 64 grains. This is close to the classical Greek weight system, where a mina (corresponding roughly to a Roman libra) was also divided into 100 drachms.

With the beginning of metrication, some countries standardized their apothecaries' pound to an easily remembered multiple of the French gramme. E.g. in the Netherlands the Dutch troy pound of 369.1 g was standardized in 1820 to 375.000 g, to match a similar reform in France. The British troy pound retained its value of 373.202 g until in 2000 it was legally defined in metric terms, as 373.2417216 g. (At this time its use was mainly confined to trading precious metals.)

=== Basic variants ===
In the Romance speaking part of Europe the scruple was divided in 24 grains, in the rest of Europe in 20 grains. Notable exceptions were Venice and Sicily, where the scruple was also divided in 20 grains.

Non-Romance variant
Libra	Uncia	Drachma	Scrupulum	Grana
1 Lb.	12 Unc.	96 Dr.	288 Scr.	5,760 Gr.
	1 Unc.	8 Dr.	24 Scr.	480 Gr.
		1 Dr.	3 Scr.	60 Gr.
			1 Scr.	20 Gr.
360 g	30 g	4 g	1.3 g	60 mg

Romance variant
Libra	Uncia	Drachma	Scrupulum	Grana
1 Lb.	12 Unc.	96 Dr.	288 Scr.	6,912 Gr.
	1 Unc.	8 Dr.	24 Scr.	576 Gr.
		1 Dr.	3 Scr.	72 Gr.
			1 Scr.	24 Gr.
360 g	30 g	4 g	1.3 g	50 mg

The Sicilian apothecaries ounce was divided into 10 drachms. Since the scruple was divided into only 20 grains, like in the northern countries, an ounce consisted of 600 grains. This was not too different from the situation in most of the other Mediterranean countries, where an ounce consisted of 576 grains.

In France, at some stage the apothecaries' pound of 12 ounces was replaced by the larger civil pound of 16 ounces. The subdivisions of the apothecaries ounce were the same as in the other Romance countries, however, and were different from the subdivisions of the otherwise identical civil ounce.

== Origins ==
=== Roman weight system ===
Roman weights
Libra	Uncia	Drachma	Scrupulum	Obolus	Siliqua	Chalcus
1 pound	12 ounces	96 drachms	288 scruples	576 oboli	1,728 siliquas	4,608 chalci
	1 ounce	8 drachms	24 scruples	48 oboli	144 siliquas	384 chalci
		1 drachm	3 scruples	6 oboli	18 siliquas	48 chalci
			1 scruple	2 oboli	6 siliquas	16 chalci
327 g	27.3 g	3.41 g	1.14 g	568 mg	189 mg	71 mg

The basic apothecaries' system consists of the units pound, ounce, and scruple from the classical Roman weight system, together with the originally Greek drachm and a new subdivision of the scruple into either 20 ("barley") or 24 ("wheat") grains (Latin: grana). In some countries other units of the original system remained in use, for example in Spain the obolo and siliqua. In some cases the apothecaries' and civil weight systems had the same ounces ("an ounce is an ounce"), but the civil pound consisted of 16 ounces. Siliqua is Latin for the seed of the carob tree.

Many attempts were made to reconstruct the exact mass of the Roman pound. One method for doing this consists in weighing old coins; another uses the fact that Roman weight units were derived from Roman units of length similar to the way the kilogramme was originally derived from the metre, i.e. by weighing a known volume of water. Nowadays the Roman pound is often given as 327.45 g, but one should keep in mind that (apart from the other uncertainties that come with such a reconstruction) the Roman weight standard is unlikely to have remained constant to such a precision over the centuries, and that the provinces often had somewhat inexact copies of the standard. The weight and subdivision of the pound in the Holy Roman Empire were reformed by Charlemagne, but in the Byzantine Empire it remained essentially the same. Since Byzantine coins circulated up to Scandinavia, the old Roman standard continued to be influential through the Middle Ages.

=== Weight system of Salerno ===
Doctors of Salerno
Libra	Uncia	Drachma	Scrupulum	Granum
1 Lb.	12 Unc.	108 Dr.	324 Scr.	6480 Gr.
	1 Unc.	9 Dr.	27 Scr.	540 Gr.
		1 Dr.	3 Scr.	60 Gr.
			1 Scr.	20 Gr.
360 g	30 g	3.3 g	1.1 g	56 mg

The history of mediaeval medicine started roughly around the year 1000 with the school of medicine in Salerno, which combined elements of Latin, Greek, Arabic, and Jewish medicine. Galen and Dioscorides (who had used the Graeco-Roman weight system) were among the most important authorities, but also Arabic physicians, whose works were systematically translated into Latin.

According to De ponderibus et mensuris, a famous 13th-century text that exists in numerous variations and is often ascribed to Dino di Garbo, the system of weights used in Salerno was different from the systems used in Padua and Bologna. As can be seen from the table, it was also different from the Roman weight system used by Galenus and Dioscorides and from all modern apothecaries' systems: The ounce was divided into 9 drachms, rather than 8 drachms.

Centuries later, the region around Salerno was the only exception to the rule that (except for skipping units that had regionally fallen out of use) the apothecaries' ounce was subdivided down to the scruple in exactly the same way as in the Roman system: It divided the ounce into 10 drachms.

== Romance countries ==
While there will naturally have been some changes throughout the centuries, this section only tries to give a general overview of the situation that was recorded in detail in numerous 19th-century merchants' handbooks.

Some Romance apothecaries' weight standards in the 19th century
1 pound	1 ounce	State or city
301.2 g	25.1 g	Venice
320.8 g	26.7 g	Kingdom of the Two Sicilies (1816–1861)
325.7 g	27.1 g	Bologna
326.8 g	27.2 g	Milan (–1815)
328.0 g	27.3 g	Parma
332.0 g	27.7 g	Sardinia
334.5 g	27.9 g	Duchy of Lucca (1815–1847)
339.2 g	28.3 g	Rome
339.5 g	28.3 g	Florence
339.5 g	28.3 g	Grand Duchy of Tuscany (–1859)
340.5 g	28.4 g	Duchy of Modena (1814–1859)
344.2 g	28.7 g	Kingdom of Portugal
344.8 g 345.1 g	28.7 g 28.8 g	Kingdom of Spain

Iberian Peninsula

On the Iberian Peninsula, apothecaries' weights in the 19th century were relatively uniform, with 24 grains per scruple (576 grains per ounce), the standard in Romance countries. The weight of an apothecaries' pound was 345.1 g in Spain and 344.2 g in Portugal. As in Italy, some of the additional subdivisions of the Roman system, such as the obolo, were still in use there. It was standard to use the marco, defined as 8 ounces, instead of the pound.

France

In 18th century France, there was a national weight standard, the marc de Paris of 8 ounces. The civil pound of 16 ounces was equivalent to 2 marks, and it was also used as the apothecaries' pound. With 30.6 g, the ounces were considerably heavier than other apothecaries ounces in Romance countries, but otherwise, the French system was not remarkable. Its history and connections to the English and Flemish standards are discussed below under Weight standards named after Troyes.

Italy

Due in part to the political conditions in what would become a united Kingdom of Italy only in 1861, the variation of apothecaries' systems and standard weights in this region was enormous. (For background information, see History of Italy during foreign domination and the unification.) The libbra (pound) generally consisted of the standard twelve ounces, however.

The civil weight systems were generally very similar to the apothecaries' system, and since the libbra (or the libbra sottile, where different systems were in use for light and heavy goods) generally had a suitable weight for an apothecaries' pound it was often used for this purpose. Extreme cases were Rome and Genoa, where the same system was used for everything, including medicine. On the other hand, there were relatively large differences even between two cities in the same state. E.g. Bologna (in the Papal States) had an apothecaries pound that was less than the local civil pound, and 4% lighter than the pound used in Rome.

The weight of an apothecaries' pound ranged generally between 300 g and 320 g, slightly less than that of a pound in the Roman Empire. An important exception to this rule is that the Kingdom of Lombardy–Venetia was under the rule of the Habsburg monarchy 1814–1859 and therefore had the extremely large Habsburg apothecaries' pound of 420 g. (See below under Habsburg standard.) E.g. in the large city of Milan the apothecaries' system based on a pound of 326.8 g was officially replaced by the metric system as early as 1803, because Milan was part of the Napoleonic Italian Republic. Since the successor of this little state, the Napoleonic Kingdom of Italy, fell to Habsburg in 1814 (at a time when even in France the système usuel had been introduced because the metric system was not accepted by the population), an apothecaries' system was officially introduced again, but now based on the Habsburg apothecaries' pound, which weighed almost 30% more.

Sicilian variant
Libra	Uncia	Drachma	Scrupulum	Grana
1 Lb.	12 Unc.	120 Dr.	360 Scr.	7,200 Gr.
	1 Unc.	10 Dr.	30 Scr.	600 Gr.
		1 Dr.	3 Scr.	60 Gr.
			1 Scr.	20 Gr.
360 g	30 g	3 g	1 g	50 mg

The apothecaries' pound in Venice had exactly the same subdivisions as those in the non-Romance countries, but its total weight of 301 g was at the bottom of the range. During the Habsburg reign of 1814–1859 an exception was made for Venice; as a result, the extreme weights of 301 g and 420 g coexisted within one state and in immediate proximity. The Venice standard was also used elsewhere, for example in Udine. In Dubrovnik (called "Ragusa" until 1909) its use was partially continued for a long time in spite of the official Habsburg weight reform.

The measure and weight systems for the large mainland part of the Kingdom of the Two Sicilies were unified in 1840. The area consisted of the southern half of the Italian Peninsula and included Naples and Salerno. The subdivision of apothecaries' weight in the unified system was essentially the same as that for gold, silver, coins, and silk. It was the most excentric variant in that the ounce was divided in 10 drachms, rather than the usual 8. The scruple, like in Venice but unlike in the rest of the Romance region, was divided into 20 grains. The existence of a unit called aureo, the equivalent of 1 1/2 dramme, is interesting because 6 aurei were 9 dramme. In the original Salerno weight system an ounce was divided into 9 drachms, and so an aureo would have been 1/6 of an ounce.

== Troyes, Nuremberg, and Habsburg ==
=== Weight standards named after Troyes ===
Late French variant
Libra	Uncia	Drachma	Scrupulum	Grana
1 Lb.	16 Unc.	128 Dr.	384 Scr.	9,216 Gr.
	1 Unc.	8 Dr.	24 Scr.	576 Gr.
		1 Dr.	3 Scr.	72 Gr.
			1 Scr.	24 Gr.
480 g	30 g	4 g	1.3 g	50 mg

As early as 1147 in Troyes in Champagne (in the Middle Ages an important trading town) a unit of weight called marc de Troyes was used.

The national French standard until 1799 was based on a famous artifact called the Pile de Charlemagne, which probably dates back to the second half of the 15th century. It is an elaborate set of nesting weight pieces, with a total metric weight of 12.238 kg. The set is now shown in the Musée des Arts et Métiers in Paris. The total nominal value of the set is 50 marcs de Troyes or marcs de Paris, a mark being 8 ounces. The ounce poids de marc had therefore a metric equivalent of 30.59 g. The poids de marc was used as a national French standard for trading, for gold, silver, and jewels, and for weighing medicine. It was also used in international communications between scientists. In the time before the French Revolution, the civil pound also played the role of the apothecaries' pound in the French apothecaries' system, which otherwise remained a standard system of the Romance (24 grains per scruple) type.

1 ounce	Standard	12 ounces
?	Marc de Troyes (Troyes)	?
30.60 g	Poids de marc (Paris)	367 g
30.76 g	Trooisch pond (Flanders)	369 g
31.10 g	Troy pound (London)	373 g

In Bruges, Amsterdam, Antwerp and other Flemish cities, a "troy" unit ("trooisch pond") was also in use as a standard for valuable materials and medicine. As in France, the way in which the Flemish troy ounce was subdivided depended on what was weighed. Unlike the French, the Flemish apothecaries divided the scruple into 20 grains. The Flemish troy pound became the standard for the gold and apothecaries' system in the United Kingdom of the Netherlands; it was also used in this way in Lübeck. (The London troy pound was referred to as the 'trooisch pond', after metrification.)

The Dutch troy mark consisted of 8 Flemish troy ounces, with each ounce of 20 engels, and each engel divided into 32 assen. The Amsterdam Pound of two marks, used in commerce, weighed 10,280 assen, while the Amsterdam Troy pound weighed 10,240 assen, i.e. exactly two troy marks.

In 1414, six years before the Treaty of Troyes, a statute of Henry V of England gave directions to the goldsmiths in terms of the troy pound. (In 1304 it had apparently not yet been introduced, since it did not appear in the statute of weights and measures.) There is evidence from the 15th century that the troy pound was used for weighing metals and spices. After the abolishment of the Tower pound in 1527 by Henry VIII, the troy pound was the official basis for English coin weights. The British apothecaries' system was based on the troy pound until metrication, and it survived in the United States and Australia well into the 20th century.

Since the modern (English, American and Imperial) troy ounces are roughly 1.5% heavier than the late Paris ounce, the exact historical relations between the original marc de Troyes, the French poids de marc, the Flemish trooisch pond and the English troy pound are unclear. It is known, however, that the numerical relation between the English and French troy ounces was exactly 64:63 in the 14th century.

=== Nuremberg standard ===
Nuremberg standard (regional variation, c. 1800)
1 ounce	Standard	1 pound
29.69 g	Sweden	356.2 g
29.82 g	Nuremberg	357.8 g
29.83 g	Lucerne	358.0 g
29.86 g	Russia	358.3 g
29.88 g	Poland	358.5 g

In the Middle Ages the Imperial Free City of Nuremberg, an important trading place in the south of Germany, produced large amounts of nesting weight pieces to various European standards. In the 1540s, the first pharmacopoeia in the modern sense was also printed there. In 1555, a weight standard for the apothecaries' pound of 12 ounces was set in Nuremberg. Under the name Nuremberg pharmaceutical weight (German: Nürnberger Medizinalgewicht) it would become the standard for most of the north-east of Europe. However, some cities kept local copies of the standard.

As of 1800 all German states and cities except Lübeck (which had the Dutch troy standard) followed the Nuremberg standard. It was also the standard for Denmark, Norway, the Russian Empire, and most cantons of Switzerland. Poland and Sweden had their own variants of the standard, which differed from each other by 0.6%.

In 1811, Bavaria legally defined the apothecaries' pound as 360.00 g (an ounce of 30.00 g). In 1815, Nuremberg lost its status as a free city and became part of Bavaria. From now on the Nuremberg apothecaries' pound was no longer the official apothecaries' pound in Nuremberg; but the difference was only 0.6%. In 1836 the Greek apothecaries' pound was officially defined by this standard, four years after Otto, the son of the king of Bavaria, became the first king of Greece. But only few German states followed the example of Bavaria, and with a long delay. The apothecaries' pound of 360 g was also adopted in Lübeck, where it was official as of 1861.

Austria and the states of the Habsburg monarchy officially had a different standard since 1761, and Prussia, followed by its neighbours Anhalt, Lippe and Mecklenburg, would diverge in the opposite direction with a reform in 1816. But in both cases apothecaries continued to use the Nuremberg standard unofficially for a long time after it became illegal.

In Russia the apothecaries' system survived well into the 20th century. The Soviet Union officially abolished it only in January 1927.

=== Habsburg standard ===
Empress Maria Theresia of Austria reformed the measures and weights of the Habsburg monarchy in 1761. The weight of an apothecaries' pound of 12 ounces was increased to a value that was later (after the kilogramme was defined) found to be 420.009 g; this was called the libra medicinalis major. It was defined as 3/4 of the unusually heavy Habsburg civil pound (defined as 6/5 of the civil pound of Cologne) and corresponded to a record ounce weight of 35 g.

Before the reform, in the north of the empire, the Nuremberg standard had been in effect, and in Italy, the local standards had been even lighter. It is not surprising that an increase of 17% and more met with some inertia. The 1770 edition of the pharmacopoeia Dispensatorium Austriaco-Viennense still used the Nuremberg standard libra medicinalis minor, indicating that even in the Austrian capital Vienna it took some time for the reform to become effective. In 1774, the Pharmacopoea Austriaco-provincialis used the new standard, and in 1783 all old apothecaries' weight pieces that were still in use were directed to be destroyed.

Venice was not part of these reforms and kept its standard of approximately 25 g per ounce.

When Austria started producing scales and weight pieces to the new standard with an excellent quality/price ratio, these were occasionally used by German apothecaries as well.

== Metrication ==
=== Early metrication ===
Name	Exact	Système usuel	Very early (replaced)
Libra	489.506 g	500.00 g	
Uncia	30.594 g	32.00 g	~~31.25 g~~
Drachma	3.824 g	4.00 g	~~3.906 g~~
Grana	0.053 g	50 mg	~~65.1 mg~~

At the time of the Industrial Revolution, the fact that each state had its own system of weights and measures became increasingly problematic. Serious work on a "scientific" system was started in France under Louis XVI, and completed in 1799 (after the French Revolution) with its implementation. The French population, however, was initially unhappy with the new system. In 1812, Napoleon I reintroduced some of the old measurements, but in a modified form that was defined with respect to the metric system. This système usuel was finally abolished in 1837 and became illegal in 1840.

Due to the large expansion of the First French Empire under Napoleon I, French metrication also affected what would be (parts of) France's neighbour countries after the Congress of Vienna.

The Netherlands were partially metricated when they were French, in the years 1810–1813. With full metrication, effective January 1821, the Netherlands reformed the trooisch pond. The apothecaries' new pound was 375.00 g. Apart from rounding issues concerning the subdivisions, this corresponded exactly to the French système usuel. (The reform was not followed in the north German city of Lübeck, which continued to use the trooisch pond.) In Belgium, apothecaries' weight was metricated effective 1856.

From 1803 to 1815, all German regions west of the River Rhine were French, organised in the départements Roer, Sarre, Rhin-et-Moselle, and Mont-Tonnerre. As a result of the Congress of Vienna these became part of various German states. A large part of the Palatinate fell to Bavaria, but having the metric system it was excepted from the Bavarian reform of weights and measures.

=== Prussia's path to metrication ===
Apothecaries' weight in Prussia
1 ounce	Standard	1 pound
29.82 g	Nuremberg (initially)	357.8 g
29.23 g	Civil pound (from 1816)	350.8 g
31.25 g	Metric pound (from 1856)	375.0 g
Abolished	Metric pound (from 1867)	Abolished

In Prussia, a reform in 1816 defined the Prussian civil pound in terms of the Prussian foot and distilled water. It also redefined the apothecaries' pound as 12 ounces, i.e. 3/4 of the civil pound: 350.78 g. This reform was not popular with apothecaries, because it broke the uniformity of the apothecaries' pound in Germany at a time when a German national state was beginning to form. It seems that many apothecaries did not follow this reduction by 2%.

Another reform in 1856 increased the civil pound from 467.711 g to 500.000 g (the German civil pound defined by the Zollverein), as a first step towards metrication. As a consequence the official apothecaries' pound was now 375.000 g, i.e. it was increased by 7%, and it was now very close to the troy standards. §4 of the law that introduced this reform said: "Further, a pharmaceutical weight deviating from the civil weight does not take place." But this paragraph was suspended until further notice.

The abolishment of the apothecaries' system meant that doctors' prescriptions had to use the current standards of measurement: grammes and kilograms. This was considered unfeasible by many, and the state received numerous protests and asked for expert advice. Nevertheless, by 1868 §4 of the earlier reform was finally put into force.

=== Metrication in countries using the troy and avoirdupois systems ===
Britain was initially involved in the development of the metric system, and the US was among the 17 initial signatories of the Metre Convention in 1875. Yet in spite of enthusiastic support for the new system by intellectuals such as Charles Dickens, these two countries were particularly slow to implement it.

In the US, the metric system replaced the apothecaries' system in the United States Pharmacopeia of 1971.

In the UK, metric drug measurements were required for dealings in drugs from January 1, 1971.

== See also ==
- List of abbreviations used in medical prescriptions
- List of Latin abbreviations
