= Avoirdupois =

System of weights

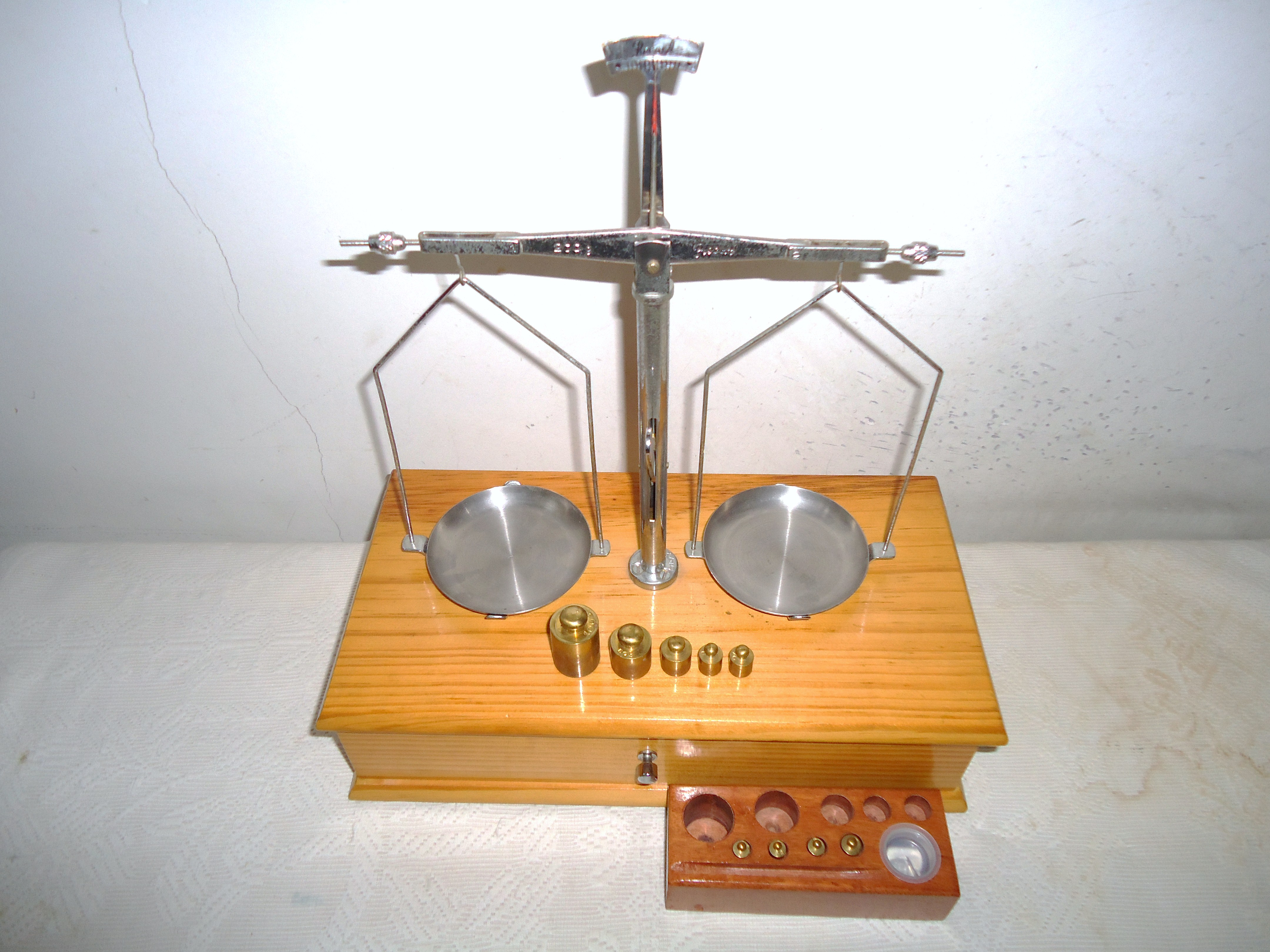
Finely crafted pan balance or scales with boxed set of standardized gram weights sequenced in units of mass.

Avoirdupois (/ˌævərdəˈpɔɪz, ˌævwɑːrdjuːˈpwɑː/; abbreviated avdp.) is a measurement system of weights that uses pounds and ounces as units. It was commonly used in the 13th century AD and was updated in 1959.

In 1959, by international agreement among countries that used the pound as a unit of mass, the International Avoirdupois Pound was fixed at the modern definition of exactly 0.45359237 kilograms.. It remains the everyday system of weights used in the United States, and is still used, in varying degrees, in everyday life in the United Kingdom and some former British colonies, despite their official adoption of the metric system.

The avoirdupois weight system's general attributes were originally developed for the international wool trade in the Late Middle Ages, when trade was in recovery. It was historically based on a physical standardized pound or "prototype weight" that could be divided into 16 ounces. (Note: School science curricula, especially empirical physical chemistry courses, often introduce students to careful measurements using a pan balance and standardized weights. These are essentially prototype weight clones.) There were a number of competing measures of mass, and the fact that the avoirdupois pound had three even numbers as divisors (half and half and half again) may have been a cause of much of its popularity, so that the system won out over systems with 12 or 10 or 15 subdivisions. The use of this unofficial system gradually stabilized (Note: Great trade fairs grew up in various sites in Europe, and their regulation and enforcement would act to define such measures.) and evolved, with only slight changes in the reference standard or in the prototype's actual mass.

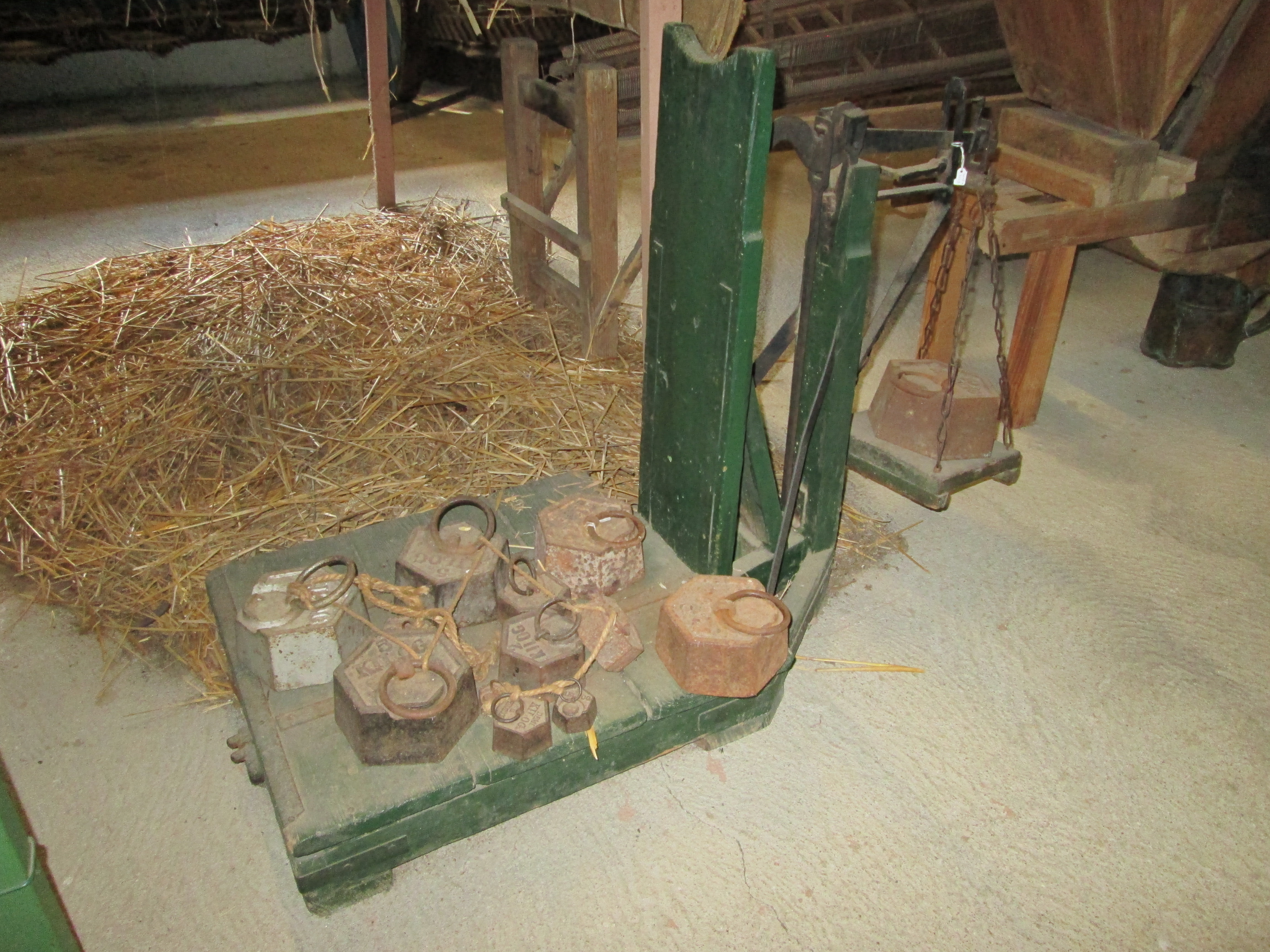
Robust weights like these hexagonal decimal-scaled antiques were used for trade into the late 20th century.

Over time, the desire not to use too many different systems of measurement allowed the establishment of "value relationships", with other commodities metered and sold by weight measurements such as bulk goods (grains, ores, flax) and smelted metals, so the avoirdupois system gradually became an accepted standard through much of Europe.

In England, Henry VII authorized its use as a standard, and Queen Elizabeth I acted three times to enforce a common standard, thus establishing what became the Imperial system of weights and measures. Late in the 19th century various governments acted to redefine their base standards on a scientific basis and establish ratios between local avoirdupois measurements and international SI metric system standards. The legal actions of these various governments were independently conceived, and so did not always pick the same ratios to metric units for each avoirdupois unit. The result of this was, after these standardisations, measurements of the same name often had marginally different recognised values in different regions (although the pound generally remained very similar). Since 1959, there is no difference in the US customary pound and the British imperial pound.

An alternative system of mass, the troy system, also denominated in pounds and ounces, is generally used for precious materials.

== Etymology ==
The word avoirdupois is from Anglo-Norman French aveir de peis (later avoir du pois), literally "goods of weight" (Old French aveir, as verb meaning "to have" and as noun meaning "property, goods", comes from the Latin habere, "to have, to hold, to possess something"; de = "from"/"of", cf. Latin; peis = "weight", from Latin pēnsum.) This term originally referred to a class of merchandise: aveir de peis, "goods of weight", things that were sold in bulk and were weighed on large steelyards or balances.

Only later did the term become identified with a particular system of units used to weigh such merchandise. Inconsistent orthography throughout history has left many variants of the term, such as haberty-poie and haber de peyse. (The Norman peis became the Parisian pois. In the 17th century de was replaced with du.)

The current spelling of the last word is poids in the current standard French orthography, but the spelling avoirdupois remained as is in the anglosphere.

== History ==
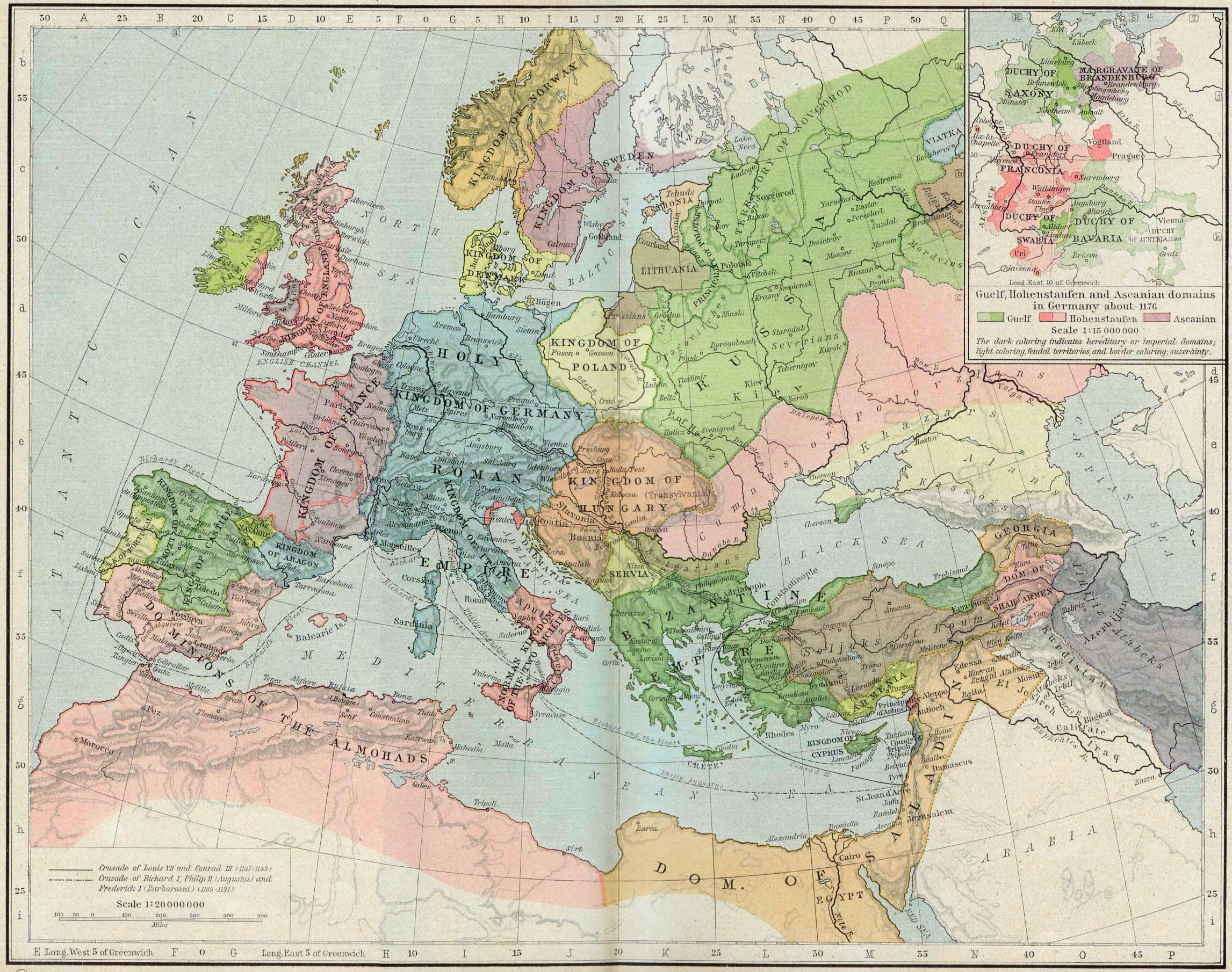
The units first became used by wool traders in the Kingdom of England and the Low Countries during the end of the High Middle Ages, as population growth and the Renaissance gave rise to an increasingly numerous town population and a newly established middle class.

The rise in use of the measurement system corresponds to the regrowth of trade during the High Middle Ages after the early crusades, when Europe experienced a growth in towns, turned from the chaos of warlordism to long-distance trade, and began annual fairs, tournaments and commerce, by land and sea. There are two major hypotheses regarding the origins of the avoirdupois system. The older hypothesis is that it originated in France. A newer hypothesis is that it is based on the weight system of Florence.

The avoirdupois weight system is thought to have come into use in England around 1300. It was originally used for weighing wool. In the early 14th century several other specialized weight systems were used, including the weight system of the Hanseatic League with a 16-ounce pound of 7200 grains and an 8-ounce mark. However, the main weight system, used for coinage and for everyday use, was based on the 12-ounce tower pound of 5400 grains. From the 14th century until the late 16th century, the system's basis and the prototype for today's international pound, the avoirdupois pound, was also known as the wool pound or the avoirdupois wool pound.

The earliest known version of the avoirdupois weight system had the following units: a pound of 6992 grains, a stone of 14 pounds, a woolsack of 26 stone, an ounce of 1/16 pound, and finally, the ounce was divided into 16 "parts".

The earliest known occurrence of the word "avoirdupois" (or some variant thereof) in England is from a document entitled Tractatus de Ponderibus et Mensuris ("Treatise on Weights and Measures"). This document is listed in early statute books under the heading 31 Edward I dated 2 February 1303. More recent statute books list it among statutes of uncertain date. Scholars nowadays believe that it was probably written between 1266 and 1303. Initially a royal memorandum, it eventually took on the force of law and was recognized as a statute by King Henry VIII and Queen Elizabeth I.

In the Tractatus, the word "avoirdupois" refers not to a weight system, but to a class of goods, specifically heavy goods sold by weight, as opposed to goods sold by volume, count, or some other method. Since it is written in Anglo-Norman French, this document is not the first occurrence of the word in the English language.

The Tractatus and other "ancient units" were repealed by the Weights and Measures Act 1824 (5 Geo. 4. c. 74). The division and mass of the Avoirdupois units were not significantly changed, but they became tied to actual physical objects and (as a backup) definitions based on physical constants. These definitions proved insufficient for recreating the physical prototypes after the 1834 Houses of Parliament fire, and a new Weights and Measures Act 1855 was passed which permitted the recreation of the prototypes from recognized secondary standards. The Act of 1855 also made the avoirdupois pound the primary unit of mass.

Comparison of the relative sizes of avoirdupois, Troy, tower, merchant and London pounds.

=== Original Anglo-Norman French forms ===
These are the units in their original Anglo-Norman French forms:

Table of mass units
Unit	Relative value	Notes
"part"	1/256	1/16 once
once (ounce)	1/16	
livre (pound)	1	
pere (stone)	14	
sak de leine (woolsack)	364	26 peres

=== Toward a uniformity of measures ===
Three major developments occurred during the reign of Edward III (r. 1327–1377). First, a statute cited as 14 Edw 3 Stat. 1 c. 12 (1340) "Bushels and Weights shall be made and sent into every County."

& acorde qe deſore en auant vn meſure & vn pois ſoit parmy toute Engleterre & qe le Treſorer face faire certaines eſtandardz de buſſel de galon de poys darreiſne & les face mander en cheſcune countee par la ou tielx eſtandardz ne ſont pas auant ces hures mandez

Translation:

(4) it is assented and accorded, That from henceforth one Measure and one Weight shall be throughout England; (5) and that the Treasurer cause to be made certain Standards of Bushels, Gallons, of Weights of Auncel, and send the same into every County where such Standards be not sent before this Time;

The second major development is the statute 25 Edw 3 Stat. 5 c. 9 (1350) "The Auncel Weight shall be put out, and Weighing shall be by equal Balance."

qe le ſak de leine ne poiſe qe vint & ſys peres & cheſcun pere poiſe quatorze livres

Translation:

so that the Sack of Wooll weigh no more but xxvi. Stones, and every Stone to weigh xiv. l.

The third development is a set of 14th-century bronze weights at the Westgate Museum in Winchester, England. The weights are in denominations of 7 pounds (corresponding to a unit known as the clip or wool-clip), 14 pounds (stone), 56 pounds (4 stone) and 91 pounds (1/4 sack or woolsack). The 91-pound weight is thought to have been commissioned by Edward III in conjunction with the statute of 1350, while the other weights are thought to have been commissioned in conjunction with the statutes of 1340. The 56-pound weight was used as a reference standard as late as 1588.

A statute of Henry VIII (24 Hen 8 c. 3) made avoirdupois weights mandatory.

In 1588 Queen Elizabeth increased the weight of the avoirdupois pound to 7000 grains and added the troy grain to the avoirdupois weight system. Prior to 1588, the "part" (1/16 ounce) was the smallest unit in the avoirdupois weight system. In the 18th century, the "part" was renamed "drachm".

=== Post-Elizabethan units ===
In the United Kingdom, 14 avoirdupois pounds equal one stone. The quarter, hundredweight, and ton equal respectively, 28 lb, 112 lb, and 2,240 lb in order for masses to be easily converted between them and stone. The following are the units in the British or imperial version of the avoirdupois system:

Table of mass units
Unit	Relative value	Metric value	Notes
dram or drachm (dr)	1/256	≈ 1.772 g	1/16 oz
ounce (oz)	1/16	≈ 28.35 g	16 dr
pound (lb)	1	≈ 453.6 g	16 oz
stone (st)	14	≈ 6.350 kg	1/2 qr
quarter (qr)	28	≈ 12.70 kg	2 st
long hundredweight (cwt)	112	≈ 50.80 kg	4 qr
ton (t) or long ton	2240	≈ 1016 kg	20 cwt

Note: The plural form of the unit stone is either stone or stones, but stone is most frequently used.

=== American customary system ===
The thirteen British colonies in North America used the avoirdupois system, but continued to use the British system as it was, without the evolution that was occurring in Britain in the use of the stone unit. In 1824 there was landmark new weights and measures legislation in the United Kingdom (Weights and Measures Act 1824) that the United States did not adopt. The International yard and pound agreement brought the systems closer; for residual differences, see Comparison of the imperial and US customary measurement systems § Weight and mass.

In the United States, quarters, hundredweights, and tons remain defined as 25, 100, and 2000 lb respectively. The quarter is now virtually unused, as is the hundredweight outside of agriculture and commodities. If disambiguation is required, then they are referred to as the smaller "short" units in the United States, as opposed to the larger British "long" units. Grains are used worldwide for measuring gunpowder and smokeless powder charges. Historically, the dram (27 11/32 grains, not to be mixed up with the apothecaries' dram of 60 grains) has also been used worldwide for measuring gunpowder charges, particularly for shotguns and large black-powder rifles.

Table of mass units
Unit	Relative value	Metric value	Notes
grain (gr)	1/7000	≈ 64.80 mg	1/7000 lb
dram (dr)	1/256	≈ 1.772 g	1/16 oz
ounce (oz)	1/16	≈ 28.35 g	16 dr
pound (lb)	1	≈ 453.6 g	16 oz
quarter (qr)	25	≈ 11.34 kg	25 lb
short hundredweight (cwt)	100	≈ 45.36 kg	4 qr
ton (t) or short ton	2000	≈ 907.2 kg	20 cwt

== See also ==
- Apothecaries' system
- Units of measurement in France
- Imperial units
- Troy weight
- United States customary units
- Weighing scales
