= Bushel =

Imperial and US customary unit

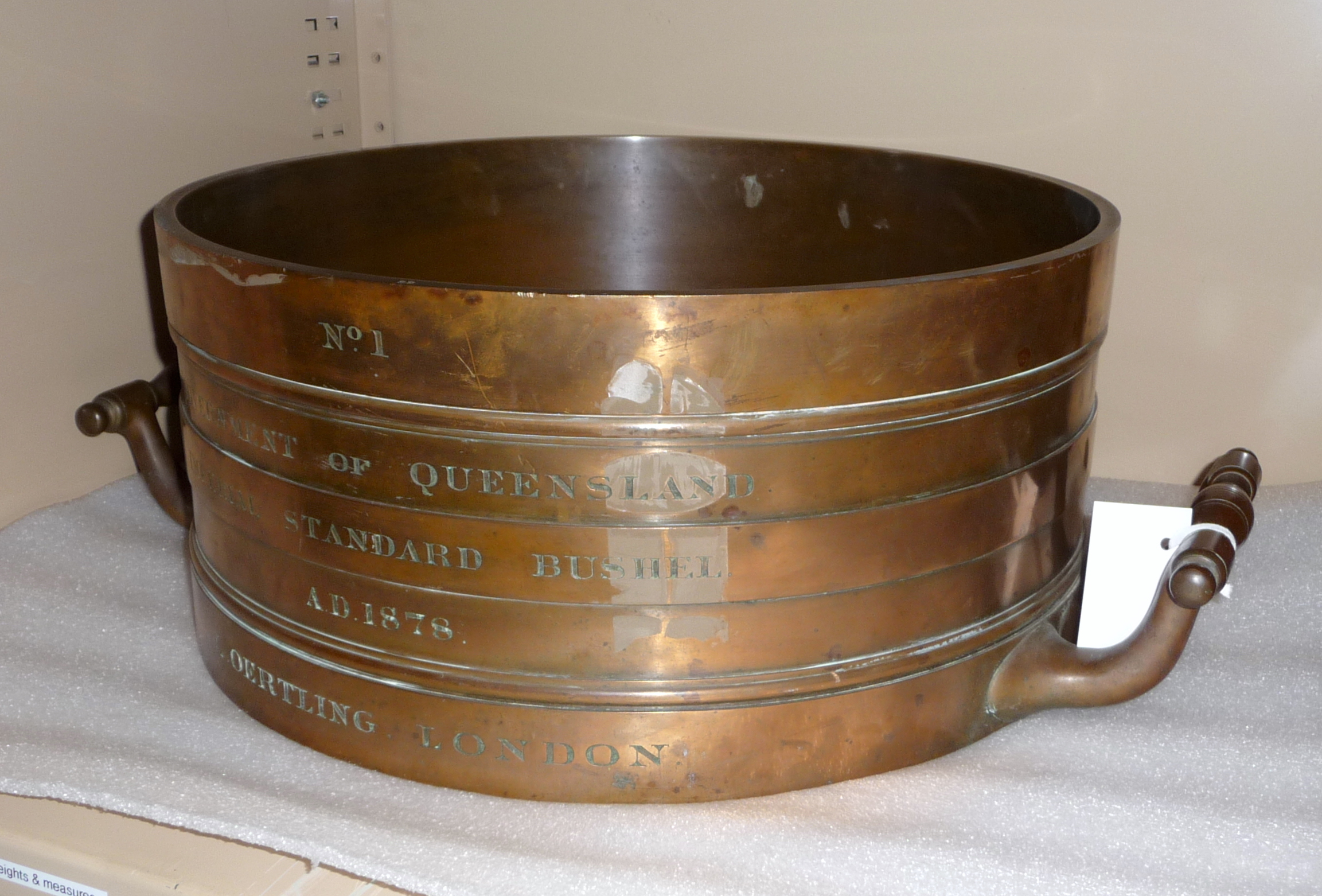
- Queensland Government Standard Imperial Bushel. Queensland Museum

General information
- Unit system: imperial and US customary
- Unit of: volume
- Symbol: bsh, bu

Conversions (imperial)
1 imp bsh in ...	... is equal to ...
- imperial units: 8 imperial gallons
- metric units: 36.36872 L
- imperial/US units: ≈2219.3555 cu in

Conversions (US)
1 US bsh in ...	... is equal to ...
- metric units: 35.23907016688 L
- US gallons: 9 3571/11550 gallons
- imperial units: ≈7.75151 imperial gallons
- imperial/US units: 2150.42 cu in

A full bushel is represented by a basket in the lower right.

A bushel (abbreviation: bsh. or bu.) is an imperial and US customary unit of volume, based upon an earlier measure of dry capacity. The old bushel was used mostly for agricultural products, such as wheat: in modern usage, the volume is nominal, with bushels denoting a mass defined differently for each commodity.

The name "bushel" is also used to translate similar units in other measurement systems.

== Etymology ==
The word "bushel" was originally used for a container, and later as a unit of measurement. The name comes from the Old French boissiel and buissiel, meaning "little box". It may further derive from Old French boise, thus meaning "little butt", and may even be possibly derived from the old Gallo-Roman word "bostia", meaning "handful".

== History ==
The bushel is an intermediate value between the pound and ton or tun that was introduced to England following the Norman Conquest. Norman statutes made the London bushel part of the legal measure of English wine, ale, and grains. The Assize of Bread and Ale credited to Henry III, c. 1266, defined this bushel in terms of the wine gallon, while the c. 1300 Assize of Weights and Measures usually credited to Edward I or II defined the London bushel in terms of the larger corn gallon. In either case, a London bushel was reckoned to contain 64 pounds, 12 ounces, 20 pennyweight, and 32 grains.

These measures were based on the relatively light tower pound and were rarely used in Scotland, Ireland, or Wales during the Middle Ages. When the Tower system was abolished in the 16th century, the bushel was redefined as 56 avoirdupois pounds.

The imperial bushel established by the Weights and Measures Act 1824 described the bushel as the volume of 80 avoirdupois pounds of distilled water in air at 62 °F (17 °C) or 8 imperial gallons. This is the bushel in some use in the United Kingdom. Thus, there is no distinction between liquid and dry measure in the imperial system.

The Winchester bushel is the volume of a cylinder 18.5 in (470 mm) in diameter and 8 in (200 mm) high, which gives an irrational number 1369π/2 ≈ 2150.4202 of cubic inches. The modern American or US bushel is rounded to exactly 2150.42 cubic inches, a difference of less than one part per ten million.

In English use, a bushel was a round willow basket with fixed dimensions, and its inside measurements were as follows – base diameter 12 inches, top diameter 18 inches, height 12 inches – thus giving a volume of 2120.58 cubic inches. A basket filled level to the top was a bushel. A basket filled to the top but overfilled to a height where it overflowed was considered to be a bushel and a peck, a generous measure (a similar concept to a baker's dozen). The 1950 song "A Bushel and a Peck" from Guys and Dolls contains the lyric "I love you, a bushel and a peck", meaning "I am overflowing with love for you".

Sometimes the basket was made 13 inches high, but with a ring of "waling" (a special willow weaving technique) to mark the 12 inches height: these baskets had a volume of 9311.68 cubic inches.

== Volume ==
1 imperial bushel	≡ 8 imperial gallons
1 imperial bushel	≡ 36.36872 litres
1 imperial bushel	≈ 9.6076 US gallons
1 imperial bushel	≈ 2219.3555 cubic inches
1 imperial bushel	≈ 1.28435 cubic feet

1 US bushel
≡ 4 US pecks
≡ 32 US dry quarts
≡ 64 US dry pints
≡ 35.23907016688 litres
≡ 9 3571/11550 US gallons = 9.3091 US gallons
≡ 37 1367/5775 US liquid quarts
≡ 74 2734/5775 US liquid pints
≈ 7.7515118 imperial gallons
≡ 2150.42 cubic inches
≡ 1 21121/86400 cubic feet

== Weight ==
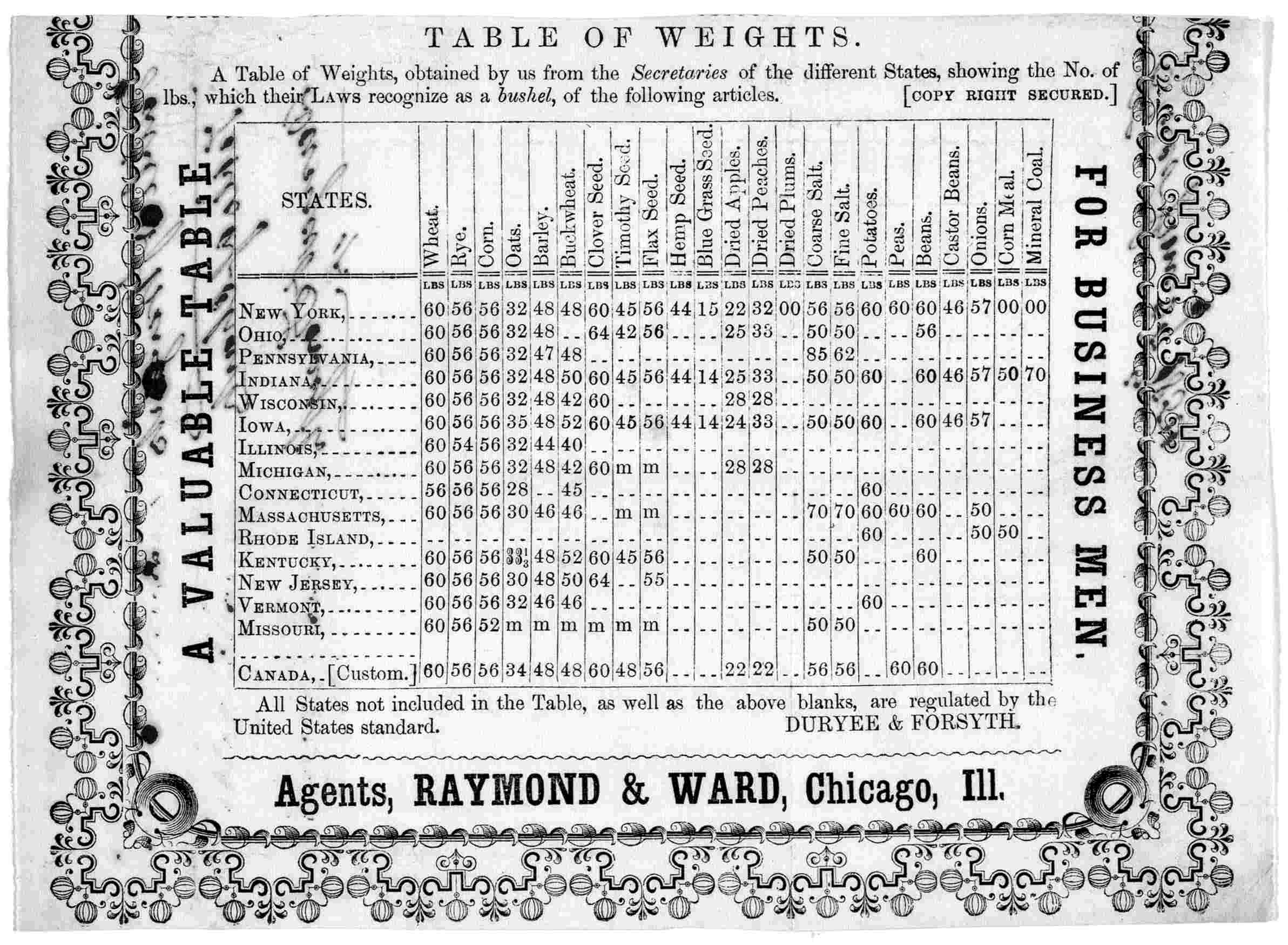
A table of weights from the secretaries of the different American states, showing the number of pounds which their laws recognize as a bushel of different articles, c. 1854

Bushels are now most often used as units of mass or weight rather than of volume. The bushels in which grains are bought and sold on commodity markets or at local grain elevators, and for reports of grain production, are all units of weight. This is done by assigning a standard weight to each commodity that is to be measured in bushels. These bushels depend on the commodities being measured, and on the moisture content of the commodity. Some of the more common ones are:

- Oats:
  - US: 32 lb (14.5150 kg)
  - Canada: 34 lb (15.4221 kg)
  - UK: 38 lb (17.2365 kg)
- Barley: 48 lb (21.7724 kg)
- Malted barley: 34 lb (15.4221 kg)
- Shelled maize (corn) at 15.5% moisture by weight: 56 lb (25.4012 kg)
- Wheat at 13.5% moisture by weight: 60 lb (27.2155 kg)
- Soybeans at 13% moisture by weight: 60 lb (27.2155 kg)

Other specific values are defined (and those definitions may vary within different jurisdictions, including from state to state in the United States) for other grains, oilseeds, fruits, vegetables, coal, hair and many other commodities.

Government policy in the United States is to phase out units such as the bushel and replace them with metric mass equivalents.

== Other units ==
The German bushel is the Scheffel. A Prussian Scheffel was equal to 54.96 litres.

The Polish bushel (korzec) was used as measure of dry capacity. It is divided into 4 quarters (ćwierć) and in the early 19th century had a value of 128 L (28 imp gal; 34 US gal) in Warsaw and 501.116 L (110.230 imp gal; 132.381 US gal) in Kraków.

The Spanish bushel (fanega) was used as a measure of dry capacity. It is roughly equal to 55.5 L (12.2 imp gal; 14.7 US gal) in Castille.

The Welsh hobbit was equivalent to two and a half bushels when used for volume; when used for measuring weight the hobbit was dependent on the grain being weighed.

== See also ==
- Coomb (unit)
- Hobbit (unit)
- Lamp under a bushel
- Winchester measure
