= Cooper (profession) =

Maker of staved vessels such as barrels

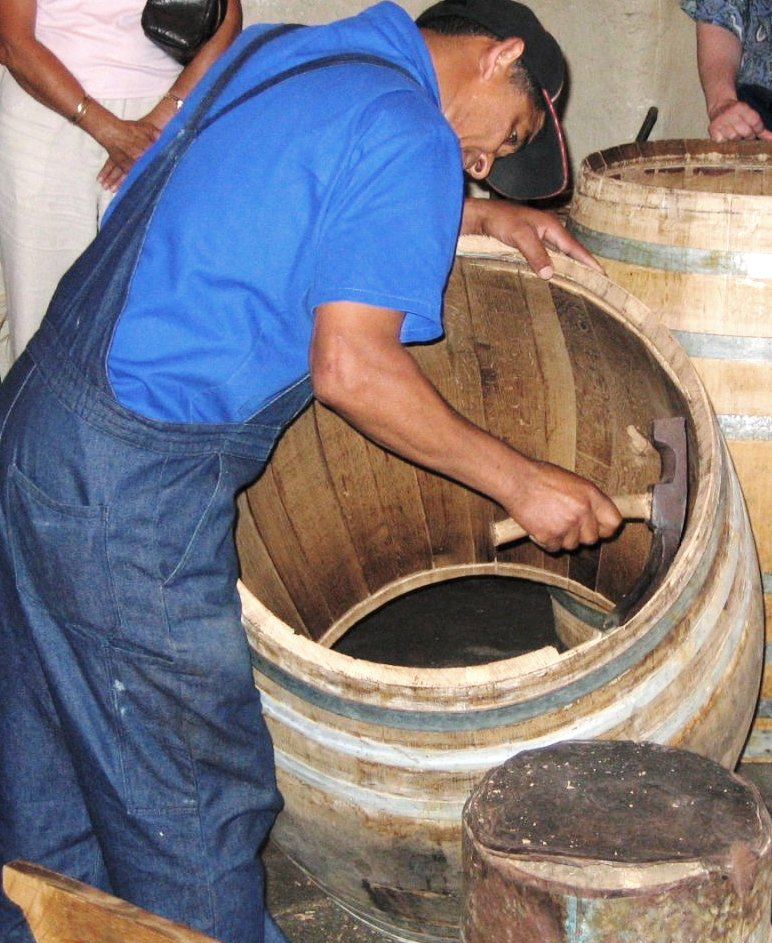
Cooper readies or rounds off the end of a barrel using a cooper's hand adze

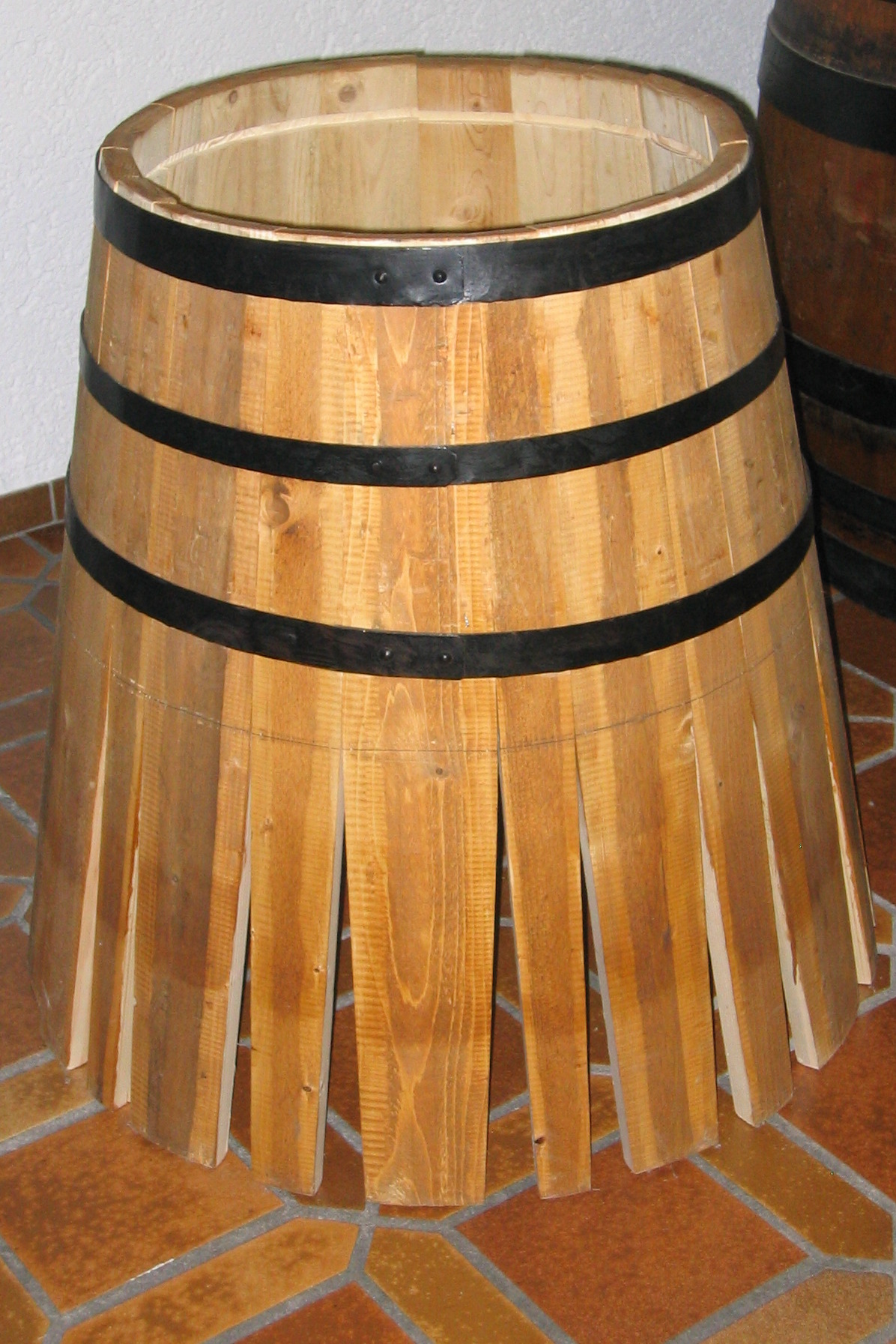
Assembly of a barrel, called mise en rose in French

A cooper is a craftsman who produces wooden casks, barrels, vats, buckets, tubs, troughs, and other similar containers from timber staves that were usually heated or steamed to make them pliable.

Journeymen coopers also traditionally made wooden implements, such as rakes and wooden-bladed shovels. In addition to wood, other materials, such as iron, were used in the manufacturing process. The trade is the origin of the surname Cooper.

== Etymology ==
The word "cooper" is derived from Middle Dutch or Middle Low German kūper 'cooper' from kūpe 'cask', in turn from Latin cupa 'tun, barrel'. The word was adopted in England and Scotland as an occupational surname, Cooper.

The art and skill of coopering refers to the manufacture of wooden casks, or barrels. The facility in which casks are made is referred to as a cooperage.

== History ==
Traditionally, a cooper is someone who makes wooden, staved vessels, held together with wooden or metal hoops and possessing flat ends or heads. Examples of a cooper's work include casks, barrels, buckets, tubs, butter churns, vats, hogsheads, firkins, tierces, rundlets, puncheons, pipes, tuns, butts, troughs, pins and breakers.

A hooper was the man who fitted the wooden or metal hoops around the barrels or buckets that the cooper had made, essentially an assistant to the cooper. The English name Hooper is derived from that profession. Over time, coopers took on the role of the hooper themselves.

=== Antiquity ===
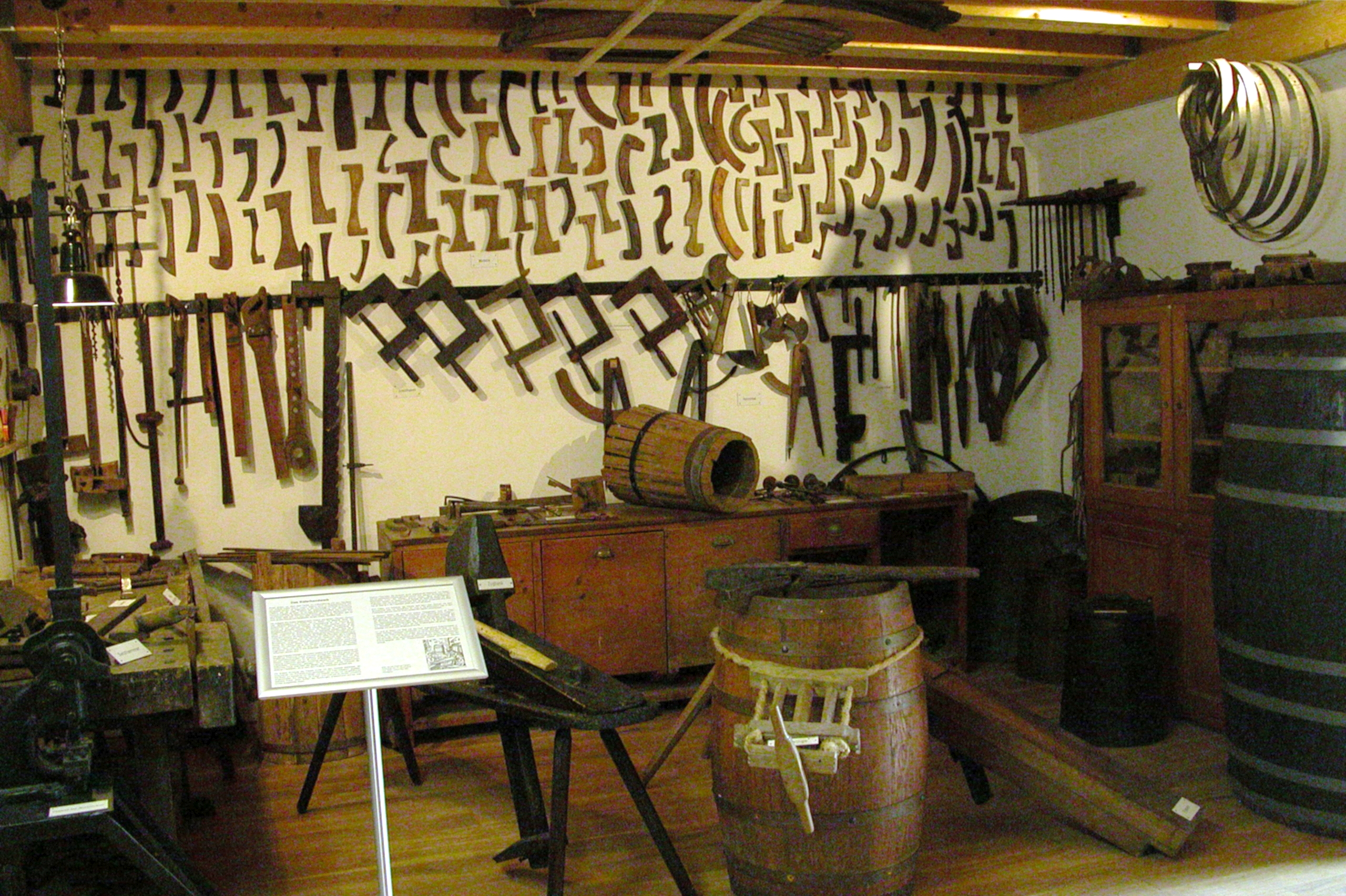
Cooper's workshop, Roscheider Hof Open Air Museum

An Egyptian wall-painting in the tomb of Hesy-Ra, dating to 2600 BC, shows a wooden tub made of staves, bound together with wooden hoops, and used to measure. Another Egyptian tomb painting dating to 1900 BC shows a cooper and tubs made of staves in use at the grape harvest. Palm-wood casks were reported in use in ancient Babylon. In Europe, buckets and casks dating to 200 BC have been found preserved in the mud of lake villages. A lake village near Glastonbury dating to the late Iron Age has yielded one complete tub and a number of wooden staves.

The Roman historian Pliny the Elder reports that cooperage in Europe originated with the Gauls in Alpine villages where they stored their beverages in wooden casks bound with hoops. Pliny identified three types of coopers: ordinary coopers, wine coopers and coopers who made large casks. Large casks contained more and longer staves and were correspondingly more difficult to assemble. Roman coopers tended to be independent tradesmen, passing their skills on to their sons. The Greek geographer Strabo records wooden pithoi (casks) were lined with pitch to stop leakage and preserve the wine. Barrels were sometimes used for military purposes. Julius Caesar used catapults to hurl barrels of burning tar into towns under siege to start fires.

Empty casks were used to line the walls of shallow wells from at least Roman times. Such casks were found in 1897 during archaeological excavation of Roman Silchester in Britain. They were made of Pyrenean silver fir and the staves were one and a half inches thick and featured grooves where the heads fitted. They had Roman numerals scratched on the surface of each stave to help with reassembly.

In Anglo-Saxon Britain, wooden barrels were used to store ale, butter, honey, and mead. Drinking vessels were also made from small staves of oak, yew or pine. These items required considerable craftsmanship to hold liquids and might be bound with finely worked precious metals. They were highly valued items and were sometimes buried with the dead as grave goods.

After the Battle of Hastings in 1066, when the Normans started settling in England, much wine was shipped over the English Channel from France.

Wherever and whatever goods were traded, casks were used, in the same way as cardboard boxes later became common storage containers.

=== Middle Ages to 20th century ===
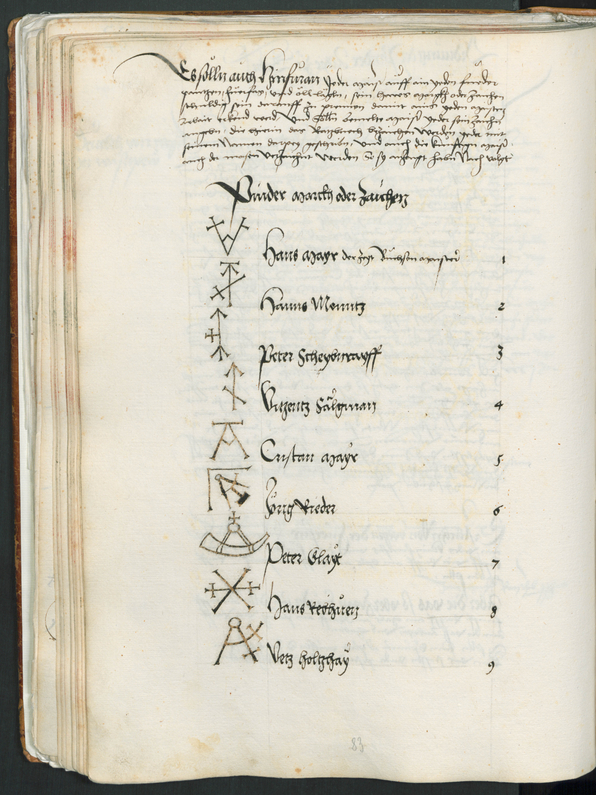
Cooper's brands from 1518 as recorded in a civic register from Bozen, South Tyrol

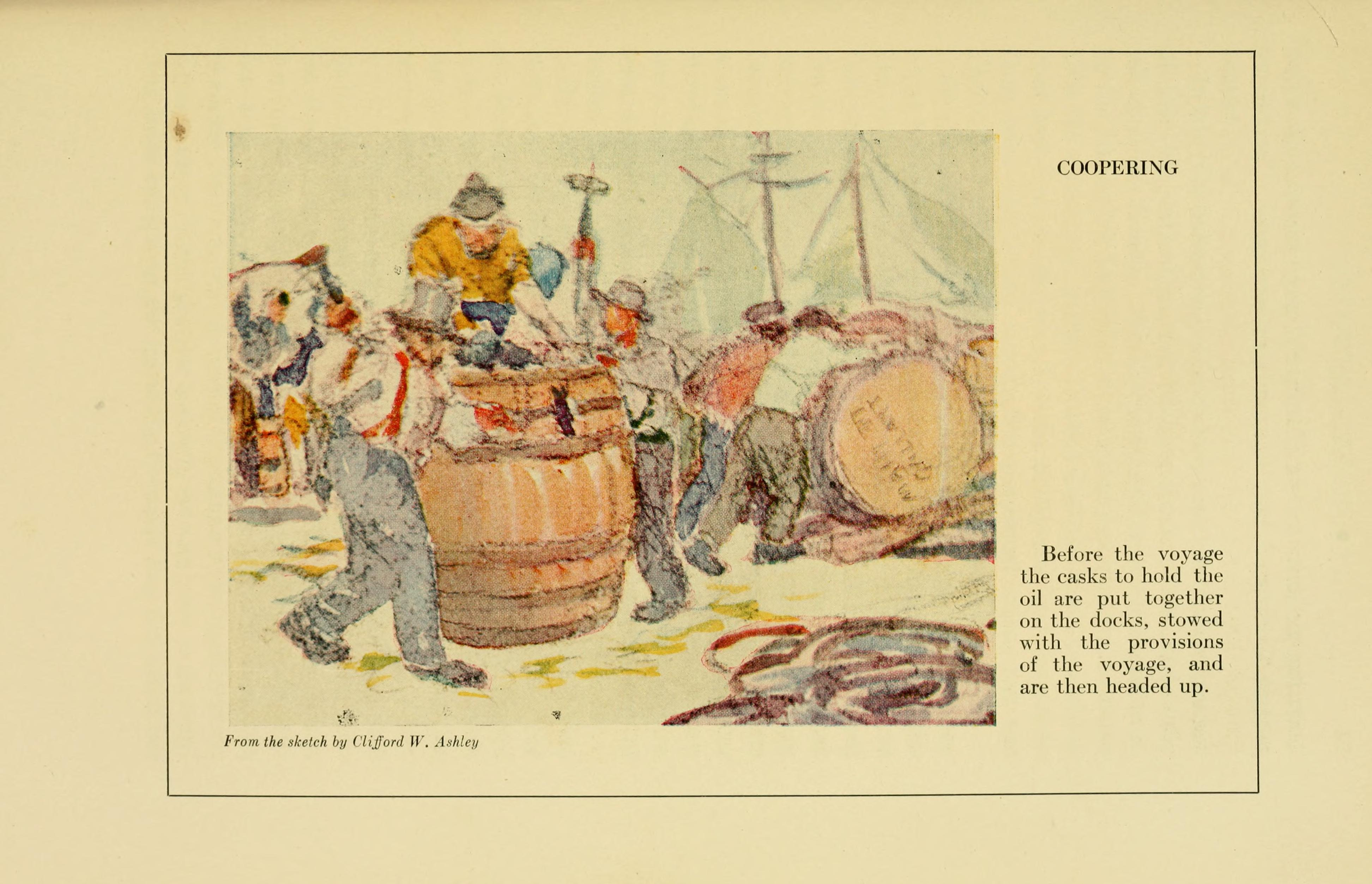
Coopering of casks on a dock for a whaler

==== On ships ====
Ships, in the age of sail, provided much work for coopers. They made water and provision casks, the contents of which sustained crew and passengers on long voyages. They also made barrels to contain high-value commodities, such as wine and sugar. The proper stowage of casks on ships about to sail was an important stevedoring skill. Casks of various sizes were used to accommodate the sloping walls of the hull and make maximum use of limited space. Casks also had to be tightly packed, to ensure they did not move during the voyage and endanger the ship, crew and cask contents.

Whaling ships in particular, featuring long voyages and large crews, needed many casks – for salted meat, other provisions and water – and to store the whale oil. Sperm whale oil was a particularly difficult substance to contain, due to its highly viscous nature, and oil coopers were perhaps the most skilled tradesmen in pre-industrial cooperage. Whaling ships usually carried a cooper on board, to assemble shooks (disassembled barrels) and maintain casks.

In the 19th century, coopers who crafted barrels on ships were often called groggers (or jolly jack tars), as when a barrel of rum had been emptied, they would fill it up with boiling water and roll it around, creating a drink which was called grog.

==== On land ====
Coopers in Britain started to organise as early as 1298. The Worshipful Company of Coopers is one of the oldest Livery Companies in London. It still survives today although it is now largely a charitable organisation. In the 16th century, the company won the right for coopers to be independent from breweries.

Many coopers worked for breweries, making the large wooden vats in which beer was brewed, such as Guinness in Ireland. They also made the wooden kegs in which the beer was shipped to liquor retailers. Beer kegs had to be particularly strong in order to contain the pressure of the fermenting liquid, and the rough handling they received when transported, sometime over long distances, to pubs where they were rolled into tap-rooms or were lowered into cellars.

An ordinance passed in 1420 in England required every cooper to stamp each finished cask with a mark unique to him so his work could be recognised and to protect the trade from interlopers. The practice continued well into the 20th century.

Prior to the mid-20th century, the cooper's trade flourished in the United States; a dedicated trade journal was published, the National Cooper's Journal, with advertisements from firms that supplied everything from barrel staves to purpose-built machinery.

After the Industrial Revolution at the turn of the 19th century and prohibition in the United States in the early 20th century, there was less demand for barrels, and over time, various other containers were manufactured for shipping goods, including shipping containers, metal drums, and corrugated cardboard. Storing, shipping, and fermenting alcohol became the main uses for wooden barrels.

In the early days, Guinness employed its own team of up to 300 highly-paid coopers in the brewery, making barrels which would be shipped around the world, and wooden casks were used by the brewery for nearly two centuries. In 1946 aluminium kegs were introduced, and over time gradually replaced the wooden barrels, until these in turn were replaced by stainless steel in the late 1980s. By 1961 there were only 70 coopers still employed by Guinness, and the last wooden cask was used in March 1963.

== Construction, types, and sizes ==
=== Wood ===
Barrels intended for wine storage are made predominantly with either French common oak (Quercus robur), French white oak (Quercus petraea) or American white oak (Quercus alba), or Quercus sessilifolia, an Asian species that grows in Japan, Taiwan, and much of south-eastern China.

=== Types of coopering ===
There are three main categories of coopering:

- White coopering, creating pails, butter churns, tubs, spoons, ladles, and other household equipment
- Dry, or "slack" (U.S.), coopering, making casks for holding dry goods, like flour, tobacco and vegetables, designed to keep moisture out
- Wet, or "tight" (U.S.) coopering, making casks for holding liquids, including water, wine, whiskey, milk, oil, and paint

=== Cask sizes ===
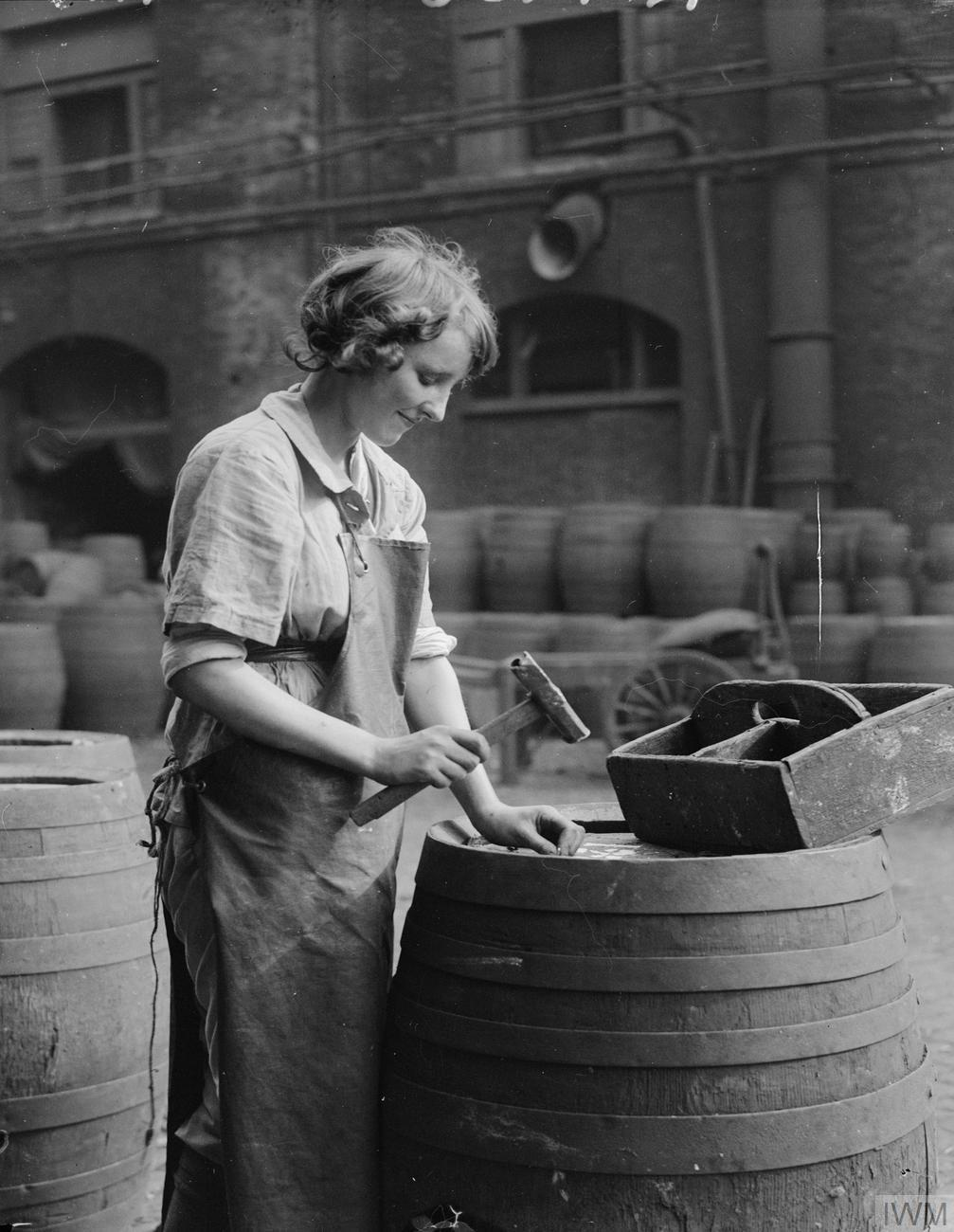
A cooper nailing the lid of a cask in place at a brewery in London during World War I

In wet coopering, wooden casks were traditionally made in several sizes in England and Ireland, including:

- Firkin, containing 8 imp gal (36 L; 9.6 US gal)
- Kilderkin, containing 16 imp gal (73 L; 19 US gal)
- Barrel, containing 32 imp gal (150 L; 38 US gal)
- Hogshead, containing 52 imp gal (240 L; 62 US gal)
- Butt, containing 104 imp gal (470 L; 125 US gal)

The firkin is the most common size for an ale cask.

=== Construction process ===
As part of the barrel-making process, the cask needs to be steamed to soften and loosen lignin in the wood, and it is then toasted. Toasting develops the flavours of the sugars in the wood, that is the cellulose and hemicellulose. Then the barrel is charred, which involves exposing it to 1,300 °F (704 °C) for 45 seconds.

A wine barrel is toasted for around 35 minutes with a low fire, while for whiskey it is usual to toast for just 45 seconds on a high fire, to burn the surface.

== 21st century ==
In the 21st century, coopers mostly operate barrel-making machinery and assemble casks for the wine and spirits industry. Traditionally, the staves were heated to make them easier to bend. This is still done, but now because the slightly toasted interior of the staves imparts a certain flavour over time to the wine or spirit contents that is much admired by experts.

In the 1960s, breweries started using metal casks because of cost and simplicity; since then, the trade of master cooper in England has been dwindling. In 2009 there were only four breweries left in England employing coopers, and only one was a master cooper: Alastair Simms at Wadworth Brewery in Devizes, Wiltshire. When he appealed for apprentices, there were many applications, but the government's insistence that trainees should attend a university killed off a lot of the interest. Subsequently, there has been a resurgence of craft breweries and English winemakers employing coopers. In 2015 Simms was at Theakston Brewery in Masham, North Yorkshire. Simms had an apprentice by November 2015. He still uses the traditional tools, including a croze which he estimates is over 250 years old.

In the United States, there are also few master coopers left. Ramiro Herrera, Master Cooper for Caldwell Vineyard in the Napa Valley, was sent to France to learn his trade, where only two out of 40 starters completed the four-year training course. It takes him around 11 hours to build a barrel, before it is ready to be toasted.

Recycling casks is common in the trade, and wine casks may be converted to contain beer. Centuries-old tools remain the preferred tool of the master cooper.

By 2021, very few of the 30-odd coopers left in the United States still used traditional methods.

The number of coopers has declined in Australia. A 1959 photograph held in the National Library of Australia is captioned "The cooper Harry Mahlo (one of the last coopers) Yalumba wineries, Angaston, Barossa Valley, South Australia, 1959". Several cooperages have closed in the 21st century, and, while there is a need for new coopers, there has been no pathway to the trade via apprenticeships since 1996, when the Howard government reformed the apprenticeship scheme to focus particularly on construction, food and hospitality, and hairdressing. In January 2024, it was reported that there was only one winery left in Australia still making its own barrels for storing wine, and there were fewer than 100 people still making barrels at small cooperages for other purposes. Some cooperages, such as the Margaret River Cooperage in Margaret River, Western Australia, do not make new barrels, but recooper imported barrels for use by small wineries.

There are more than 150 cooperage companies in France, representing approximately 1,500 people employed in the French cooperage world and 600,000 barrels produced. This makes France the world leader. Fifty of them are grouped together in the French Cooperage Federation (Fédération française de tonnellerie), created in 1978, and represent 90% of French production. They are mainly located in the five major wine-growing basins. These companies export 75% of their production worldwide, half of which to the United States. Some cooperages are listed on the stock exchange, making it one of the most dynamic sectors in the French wood industry. Cooperage represents the largest market for French oak wood, with 300,000 m3 of logs purchased in 2014.

== In film ==
The 2015 film In the Heart of the Sea featured master cooper Alastair Simms, who made 200 barrels for the film.

== See also ==
- Coopers' Dance
- Society for the Preservation of Beers from the Wood
