= Quarter (unit) =

Various traditional units defined as one-fourth of some other unit

The quarter (lit. "one-fourth") was used as the name of several distinct English units based on ¼ sizes of some base unit.

The "quarter of London" (Latin: quarterium Londoniense) mentioned by Magna Carta as the national standard measure for wine, ale, and grain (Note: 9 Henry III c. 25 (1225).) was ¼ ton or tun. It continued to be used, e.g. to regulate the prices of bread. This quarter was a unit of 8 bushels of 8 gallons each, understood at the time as a measure of both weight and volume: the grain gallon or half-peck was composed of 76,800 (Tower) grains weight; the ale gallon was composed of the ale filling an equivalent container; and the wine gallon was composed of the wine weighing an equivalent amount to a full gallon of grain.

== Length ==
In measures of length, the quarter (qr.) was ¼ of a yard, formerly an important measure in the cloth trade. 3 qr. was a Flemish ell, 4 quarters were a yard, 5 qr. was an (English) ell, and 6 qr. was an aune or French ell. Each quarter was made up of 4 nails. Its metric equivalent was formerly reckoned as about 0.228596 m, but the International Yard and Pound Agreement set it as 0.2286 exactly in 1959. (Note: Although not enacted in the United Kingdom until 1963.)

== Weight ==
Tool chest with nett weight 2 qrs 3 lbs (about 27 kg).

The modern statutory definition of Imperial units, the Weights and Measures Act 1985 as amended by The Units of Measurement Regulations 1994, defines the quarter as a unit of mass equal to 28 pounds.

In measures of weight and mass at the time of Magna Carta, the quarter was 1/4 ton or (originally 500 pounds). By the time of the Norman French copies of the c. 1300 Assize of Weights and Measures, the quarter had changed to 512 lbs. These copies describe the "London quarter" as notionally derived from eight "London bushels" of eight wine gallons of eight pounds of 15 ounces of 20 pennyweights of 32 grains of wheat, taken whole from the middle of an ear; the published Latin edition omits the quarter and describes corn gallons instead.

The quarter (qr. av. or quartier) came to mean 1/4 of a hundredweight: 2 stone or 28 avoirdupois pounds (about 12.7 kg): this is its (only) statutory definition since 1993.

It is still used to indicate the weight of bells, whose weight are usually given in the form "cwt-qrs-lbs". cwt indicates a hundredweight (112 lb), so a 'quarter' is 28 lb.

=== Colloquial usage ===
In Britain and Ireland, "quarter" was also a common shortening of "quarter-pound," (113 grams) when selling food by weight, such as sweets.

== Volume ==
The Weights and Measures Act 1824 (5 Geo. 4. c. 74) declared that, for measures of liquids and unheaped dry volume, a 'quarter' equals eight bushels (64 imperial gallons (290.95 L), where a gallon is defined as a volume of water weight ten troy pounds). The term pail is also used for this unit of dry volume. The 1824 Act delegitimised all previous definitions.

The Weights and Measures Act 1985 (as amended) no longer shows the quarter as a unit of volume: an 1825 quarter of wheat would weigh about 494 lb (224 kg), (Note: The density of wheat is 0.770, and a quarter by volume (64 gallons) equates to 290.95 litres, which multiplied by 0.770 gives 224 kilograms (494 lb).) substantially more than the 1985 definition.

In measures of liquid volume at the time of Magna Carta, the quarter of wine was (originally) ¼ tun: 8 London bushels or 64 wine gallons (242.27 L) . The tun was subsequently redefined as 252 gallons, and the quarter was effectively ¼ pipe or butt. The quarter of wine was a gallon larger than a hogshead: since the wine gallon was considered to be 231 cubic inches, the measure was 242.27 litres.

The ale gallon was 282 cubic inches, meaning the quarter of ale was 295.75 litres.

Cardarelli also says it can vary from 17 to 30 imperial gallons for liquor.

== See also ==
- English, Imperial, & US customary units
