= Dwina (1792 ship) =

British merchant ship and whaler (1792–1804)

History

Great Britain
- Name: Dwina
- Namesake: Probably Western Dvina
- Launched: 1792, Kingston upon Hull
- Fate: Wrecked 14 April 1804

General characteristics
- Tons burthen: 297 (bm)
- Armament: 2 × 6-pounder + 2 × 3-pounder guns or 4 × 6-pounder guns

Dwina (or Dwyna) was launched at Kingston upon Hull in 1792. She primarily traded between Hull and Baltic ports, though she did make some voyages to the Mediterranean. In 1802 she became a whaler in the northern whale fishery. She made two complete voyages; ice wrecked her in 1804 shortly after she arrived at Greenland on her third voyage.

== Career ==
Dwina first appeared in Lloyd's Register (LR) in 1792.

Year	Master	Owner	Trade	Source
1792	G.Gardener	Carlill & Co.	Hull–Riga	LR
1795	W.Sharp	Carlill & Co.	Hull–Barcelona	LR
1797	W.Sharp	Carlill & Co.	Hull–Petersburg	LR
1802	W.Sadler; J.Sasker	Carlill & Co. Gilder & Co.	Hull–Baltic	LR
1802	W.Sharp; J.Sadler	Carlill & Co. Gilder & Co.	London–Petersburg; Hull–Greenland	Register of Shipping
1803	W.Sadler; J.Mitchinson	Carlill & Co. Gilder & Co.	Hull–Baltic	LR
1804	J.Mitchinson	Gilder & Co.	Hull–Greenland	LR

The whaling data below is from Coltish, augmented with press reports.

Year	Master	Where	Tuns whale oil
1802	Sadler	Greenland	123
1803	Mitchinson	Greenland	44
1804		Greenland	0

After her second whaling voyage, Captain Mitchinson sailed Dwina to Petersburg and back to Hull.

== Fate ==
Dwina was lost at Greenland on 14 April 1804. Her crew was saved.

Dwina was the only Hull whaler lost in the season. The other forty or so had a successful whaling season, with some gathering up to 19 whales. The season was one of the most successful in memory.
