= Richmond Tobacco Exchange =

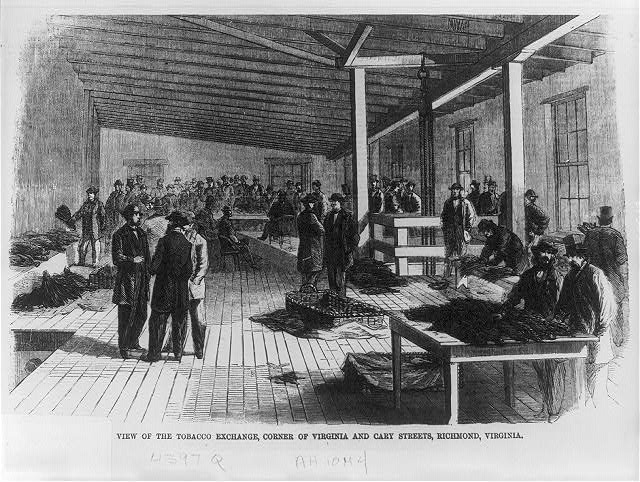
- Location: Richmond, Virginia, United States
- Coordinates: 37.534848°N 77.432916°W
- Founded: 1858
- Commodities: tobacco

Richmond Tobacco Exchange was a commodities exchange in Richmond, Virginia, where tobacco was traded.

It was established in 1858. Tobacco farmers opposed its creation, because the exchange was controlled by merchants.

The Richmond Chamber of Commerce reported sales of leaf tobacco through the exchange for the year ended September 30, 1873 were 45,595 hogsheads, 11,415 tierces and 1,814 boxes. In the year ended September 30, 1872, 2,593,110 pounds (1,176,210 kg) of loose tobacco was weighed at warehouses in Richmond, most at the Shockoe Warehouse.
