= Builder's Old Measurement =

Estimate of the cargo capacity of a sailing vessel (c. 1650–1849)

Builder's Old Measurement (BOM, bm, OM, and o.m.) is the method used in England from approximately 1650 to 1849 for calculating the cargo capacity of a ship. It is a volumetric measurement of cubic capacity. It estimated the tonnage of a ship based on length and maximum beam. It is expressed in "tons burden" (Early Modern English: burthen, Middle English: byrthen), and abbreviated "tons bm".

The formula is:

$$\text{Tonnage} = \frac {(\text{Length}- (\text{Beam}\times\frac{3} {5})) \times \text{Beam} \times \frac {\text{Beam}}{2}} {94}$$

where:

- Length is the length, in feet, from the stem to the sternpost;
- Beam is the maximum beam, in feet.

The Builder's Old Measurement formula remained in effect until the advent of steam propulsion. Steamships required a different method of estimating tonnage, because the ratio of length to beam was larger and a significant volume of internal space was used for boilers and machinery. In 1849, the Moorsom System was created in the United Kingdom. The Moorsom system calculates the cargo-carrying capacity in cubic feet, another method of volumetric measurement. The capacity in cubic feet is then divided by 100 cubic feet (2.8 m^{3}) of capacity per gross ton, resulting in a tonnage expressed in tons.

== History and derivation ==
King Edward I levied the first tax on the hire of ships in England in 1303 based on tons burthen. Later, King Edward III levied a tax of 3 shillings on each tun of imported wine, roughly equivalent to £149 in 2025. (Note: Inflation, taking the last year of Edward III's reign, 1377, as the base year, and a shilling as one-twentieth of a pound sterling.) At that time a tun was a wine container of 252 wine gallons, approx 210 imp gal (955 L) weighing about 2,240 lb (1,020 kg), a weight known today as a long ton or imperial ton. In order to estimate the capacity of a ship in terms of tuns for tax purposes, an early formula used in England was:

$$\text{Tonnage} = \frac {\text{Length}\times \text{Beam} \times \text{Depth}} {100}$$

where:

- Length is the length (undefined), in feet
- Beam is the beam, in feet.
- Depth is the depth of the hold, in feet below the main deck.

The numerator yields the ship's volume expressed in cubic feet.

If a tun is deemed to be equivalent to 100 cubic feet, then the tonnage is simply the number of such 100 cubic feet 'tun' units of volume. (The divisor of 100 is dimensionless, so tonnage would be expressed in 'ft^{3} of tun'.)

In 1678 Thames shipbuilders used a method assuming that a ship's burden would be 3/5 of its displacement. Since tonnage is calculated by multiplying length × beam × draft × block coefficient, all divided by 35 ft^{3} per ton of seawater, the resulting formula would be:

$$\text{Tonnage} = \frac {\text{Length}\times \text{Beam} \times \frac {\text{Beam}}{2} \times \frac {3}{5}\times {0.62}} {35}$$

where:

- Draft is estimated to be half of the beam.
- Block coefficient is based on an assumed average of 0.62.
- 35 ft^{3} is the volume of one ton of sea water.

Or by solving:

$$\text{Tonnage} = \frac {\text{Length}\times\text{Beam} \times \frac \text{Beam}{2}} {94}$$

In 1694 a new British law required that tonnage for tax purposes be calculated according to a similar formula:

$$\text{Tonnage} = \frac {\text{Length}\times\text{Beam} \times \text{Depth}} {94}$$

This formula remained in effect until the Builder's Old Measurement rule (above) was put into use in 1720, and then mandated by Act of Parliament in 1773.

== Depth ==
Depth to deck
The height from the underside of the hull, excluding the keel itself, at the ship's midpoint, to the top of the uppermost full-length deck.
Depth in hold
Interior space; The height from the lowest part of the hull inside the ship, at its midpoint, to the ceiling that is made up of the uppermost full-length deck. For old warships it is to the ceiling that is made up of the lowermost full-length deck.
Main deck
Main deck, that is used in context of depth measurement, is usually defined as the uppermost full-length deck. For the 16th-century ship Mary Rose, main deck is the second uppermost full-length deck. In a calculation of the tonnage of Mary Rose the draft was used instead of the depth.

== American tons burthen ==
The British took the length measurement from the outside of the stem to the outside of the sternpost, whereas the Americans measured from inside the posts. The British measured breadth from outside the planks, whereas the Americans measured the breadth from inside the planks. Lastly, the British divided by 94, whereas the Americans divided by 95.

The upshot was that American calculations gave a lower number than the British ones. The British measure yields values about 6% greater than the American. For instance, when the British measured the captured USS President, their calculations gave her a burthen of 1,533 7/94 tons, whereas the American calculations gave the burthen as 1,444 tons.

The US system was in use from 1789 until 1864, when a modified version of the Moorsom System was adopted.

== France ==
A similar method was used in France to assess the cargo capacity of ships. This was standardised in 1681 at 1 tonne burthen per 42 French cubic feet. Prior to metrification this unit was called a port (from porter, transl. to carry) tonneau (plural tonneaux).

== See also ==
- Thames Measurement – Measurement system approximating the internal volume of a vessel
