= Gross register tonnage =

Volume of a ship in units of 100 cubic feet

Gross register tonnage (GRT, grt, g.r.t., gt), or gross registered tonnage, is a ship's total internal volume expressed in "register tons", each of which is equal to 100 cubic feet (2.83 m^{3}). Replaced by gross tonnage (GT), gross register tonnage uses the total permanently enclosed capacity of the vessel as its basis for volume. Typically, this is used for dockage fees, canal transit fees, and similar purposes where it is appropriate to charge based on the size of the entire vessel. Internationally, GRT may be abbreviated as BRT for the German "Bruttoregistertonne".

Net register tonnage subtracts the volume of spaces not available for carrying cargo, such as engine rooms, fuel tanks and crew quarters, from gross register tonnage.

Gross register tonnage is not a measure of the ship's mass, weight or displacement and should not be confused with terms such as deadweight tonnage or displacement.

== History ==
Gross register tonnage was defined by the Moorsom Commission in 1849.

Gross and net register tonnages were replaced by gross tonnage and net tonnage, respectively, when the International Maritime Organization (IMO) adopted The International Convention on Tonnage Measurement of Ships on 23 June 1969. The new tonnage regulations entered into force for all new ships on 18 July 1982, but existing vessels were given a migration period of 12 years to ensure that ships were given reasonable economic safeguards since port and other dues are charged according to ship's tonnage.

Since 18 July 1994, the gross and net tonnages, dimensionless indices calculated from the total moulded volume of the ship and its cargo spaces by mathematical formulae, have been the only official measures of the ship's tonnage. However, the gross and net register tonnages are still widely used in describing older ships.

== See also ==
- Ton (volume)
- Tonnage
