= Puncheon (unit) =

Unit of volume for beer, wines, and spirits

The puncheon was a British unit for beer, wines and spirits. It was also an American unit of capacity for wine.

== Definition ==
Historically, the puncheon has been defined somewhere between 70 and 120 imperial gallons (318 and 546 litres; 84.1 and 144 US gallons).

=== US unit of capacity for wine ===
The US puncheon for wine is defined as 84 US gallons (318 litres).

English wine cask units
gallon	rundlet	barrel	tierce	hogshead	puncheon, tertian	pipe, butt	tun	
							1	tun
						1	2	pipes, butts
					1	1 1/2	3	puncheons, tertians
				1	1 1/3	2	4	hogsheads
			1	1 1/2	2	3	6	tierces
		1	1 1/3	2	2 2/3	4	8	barrels
	1	1 3/4	2 1/3	3 1/2	4 2/3	7	14	rundlets
1	18	31 1/2	42	63	84	126	252	gallons (wine)
3.785	68.14	119.24	158.99	238.48	317.97	476.96	953.92	litres
1	15	26 1/4	35	52 1/2	70	105	210	gallons (imperial)
4.546	68.19	119.3	159.1	238.7	318.2	477.3	954.7	litres

== Conversion ==
- 1 puncheon = 70-120 gallons
- 1 puncheon = 0.318-0.546 m^{3} or 318 to 546 litres.

=== US unit of capacity for wine ===
- 1 puncheon = 4/3 Hogshead
- 1 puncheon = 84 gallons
- 1 puncheon = 0.317974589856 m^{3} or about 318 litres.

== See also ==
- English wine cask units
