= Tonnage =

Measure of the volumetric capacity of a ship

Tonnage is a measure of the capacity of a ship, and is commonly used to assess fees on commercial shipping. The term derives from the taxation paid on tuns or casks of wine. In modern maritime usage, "tonnage" specifically refers to a calculation of the volume or cargo volume of a ship. Although tonnage (volume) should not be confused with displacement (the actual mass of the vessel), the long ton (or imperial ton) of 2,240 lb is derived from the fact that a "tun" of wine typically weighed that much.

== Current maritime units ==
Tonnage measurements are governed by an IMO Convention (International Convention on Tonnage Measurement of Ships, 1969 (London-Rules)), which initially applied to all ships built after July 1982, and to older ships from July 1994. A commonly defined measurement system is important, since a ship's registration fee, harbour dues, safety and manning rules, may be based on its gross tonnage (GT) or net tonnage (NT).

=== Gross tonnage ===
Gross tonnage (GT) is a function of the volume of all of a ship's enclosed spaces (from keel to funnel) measured to the outside of the hull framing. The numerical value for a ship's GT is always smaller than the numerical values of gross register tonnage (GRT). Gross tonnage is therefore a kind of capacity-derived index that is used to rank a ship for purposes of determining manning, safety, and other statutory requirements and is expressed simply as GT, which is a unitless entity, even though it derives from the volumetric capacity in cubic metres.

=== Net tonnage ===
Net tonnage (NT) is based on a calculation of the volume of all cargo spaces of the ship. It indicates a vessel's earning space and is a function of the moulded volume of all cargo spaces of the ship.

=== Panama Canal/UMS ===
The Panama Canal/Universal Measurement System (PC/UMS) is based on net tonnage modified for Panama Canal purposes. PC/UMS is based on a mathematical formula to calculate a vessel's total volume; one PC/UMS net ton is equivalent to 100 cubic feet (2.83 m^{3}) of capacity.

=== Suez Canal Net Tonnage ===
The Suez Canal Net Tonnage (SCNT) is derived with a number of modifications from the former net register tonnage of the Moorsom System and was established by the International Commission of Constantinople in its Protocol of 18 December 1873. The measurement is still in use, as amended by the Rules of Navigation of the Suez Canal Authority and is registered in the Suez Canal Tonnage Certificate.

=== Thames measurement tonnage ===
Thames measurement tonnage (TM) is another volumetric system, generally used for small vessels such as yachts; it uses a formula based on the vessel's length and beam.

== Historical maritime units ==
=== Traditional casks ===
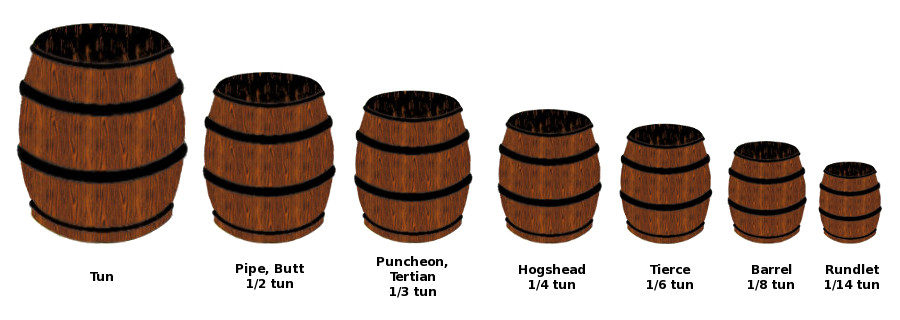
Traditional English wine cask units

Historically in England, tunnage was the medieval import duty on tuns of wine. A tun was a large size of casks used for wine), used in the wine trade. The number of tuns that a ship could carry was used as a measure of the size of the ship.

The wine trade to England originated in France, which is where the tuns were made. A French standard tun cask size was established about 1450. The 15th century Bordeaux wine tun was between 240 and 252 imperial gallons (1,090 and 1,150 L; 288 and 303 US gal). (Note: One complexity with understanding the actual volume of the medieval wine tun was that there was a wine gallon of 232 cubic inches (3.80 L) compared to the imperial gallon of 277 cubic inches (4.54 L).) When measuring the tonnage of a ship, the approximately cylindrical cask would have air space around it when stowed in a ship. Therefore the volume of hold space required for several tuns was greater than the total of the capacity of those tuns. 252 imperial gallons is just over 40 cubic feet (1.1 m^{3}). British practice by the 19th century was for a ton of cargo volume to be 50 cubic feet (1.4 m^{3}). This is derived from an estimate of the hull space needed to fit the roughly cylindrical tun and is broadly consistent with the much earlier French definition given below.

The Bordeaux tun was used as a measurement elsewhere in Europe. By the 16th century, multi-decked ships which were loaded through hatchways (as opposed to earlier undecked or single decked ships) found it more convenient to use a smaller size of standard barrel. This was the barrique bordelaise, measuring a quarter of the size of the tun (in English, this barrel was termed a hogshead). For instance, Basque ships engaged in 16th century whaling in Labrador used this size of barrel (with the name barrica). The French tonneau de mer was legally defined, in 1681, as the cubic space into which four barrique bordelaise fitted, with the casks aligned two directly above the two below (so not optimising the layout). This redefined ton worked out as 42 cubic pieds de roi (1.44 cubic metres (51 cu ft). The difference between this measure and, for instance, the Spanish toneladas was calculated by recognised adjustment factors.

=== Purpose of measuring tonnage ===
Tonnage measurement was important for an increasing number of reasons through history. In England in the Middle Ages, ships were often impressed by the crown for military use. To do this in an efficient and speedy manner, a measurement of size was needed. The payment to the owner of the requisitioned ship was based on the tonnage. Port dues and various licences were based on tonnage, and it was a useful measure for a ship builder who needed to build a vessel that met the new owner's requirements.

In the Tudor period a bounty per ton was paid for the construction of larger ships, so the threshold for that payment had to be determined, as well as the amount paid for those qualifying.

=== Method of measuring ===
In the middle ages, the normal way of discovering the tonnage of a ship was to load her with wine and see how many tuns could be fitted in. There is an instance of the owner of a new ship, in 1459, being challenged that his safe-conduct was for a 400 ton vessel, whilst he had already loaded more than 600 tons. The excuse was accepted that he had no idea of her tonnage until she was loaded. In another case, in 1456, a dispute over the actual tonnage of a ship had to be resolved by having coopers part load her with (presumably empty) barrels to estimate what she could carry.

The Tudor bounty paid for the construction of larger ship was apparently paid without any measurement system to confirm the actual size. The presumption is that it was taken from the amount of cargo unloaded after the first voyage (which would be recorded in the customs records of the relevant port).

=== Gross register tonnage ===
Gross register tonnage (GRT) represents the total internal volume of a vessel, where one register ton is equal to a volume of 100 cubic feet (2.83 m^{3}); a volume that, if filled with fresh water, would weigh around 2.83 tonnes. The definition and calculation of the internal volume is complex; for instance, a ship's hold may be assessed for bulk grain (accounting for all the air space in the hold) or for bales (omitting the spaces into which bulk, but not baled cargo, would spill). Gross register tonnage was replaced by gross tonnage in 1982 under the Tonnage Measurement convention of 1969, with all ships measured in GRT either scrapped or re-measured in GT by 1994.

=== Net register tonnage ===
Net register tonnage (NRT) is the volume of cargo the vessel can carry—that is, the gross register tonnage less the volume of spaces that do not hold cargo (e.g., engine compartment, helm station, and crew spaces, again with differences depending on which port or country does the calculations). It represents the volume of the ship available for transporting freight or passengers. It was replaced by net tonnage in 1994, under the Tonnage Measurement convention of 1969.

== See also ==
- Builder's Old Measurement
- Displacement (ship)
- List of largest ships by gross tonnage
- Long ton
- Short ton
- Ton
- Tonne (or 'metric ton')

== Bibliography ==
- The Oxford Companion To Ships & The Sea, by I. C. B. Dear and Peter Kemp. Oxford University Press, 1979. ISBN 0-19-860616-8
- Ship Design and Construction, Volume II; Thomas Lamb, Editor. Society of Naval Architects and Marine Engineers, 2004. ISBN 99909-0-620-3
- Lane, Frederic C. (1964). "Tonnages, Medieval and Modern". The Economic History Review. 17 (2): 213–233. ISSN 0013-0117. JSTOR 2593003.
