= Tun (unit) =

English unit of liquid volume

The tun (Old English: tunne, Latin: tunellus, Medieval Latin: tunna) is an English unit of liquid volume (not weight), used for measuring wine, oil or honey. Typically a large vat or vessel, most often holding 252 wine gallons, but occasionally other sizes (e.g. 256, 240 and 208 gallons) were also used. The modern tun is about 954 litres.

The word tun is etymologically related to the word ton for the unit of mass, the mass of a tun of wine being approximately one long ton, which is 2240 pounds (1016 kg). The spellings "tun" and "ton" were sometimes used interchangeably.

== History ==
Originally, the tun was defined as 256 wine gallons; (Note: 256=2^{8}) this is the basis for the name of the quarter of 64 corn gallons. At some time before the 15th century, it was reduced to 252 wine gallons, so as to be evenly divisible by other small integers, including seven. (Note: 252 = 2^{2}×3^{2}×7)

In one Early Modern English example from 1507, a tun is defined as 240 gallons.

He that ys a gawner owght to understonde there ys in a tunne lx systerns and every systern ys iiii galons be yt wyne or oylle.

—Untitled manuscript, consisting of a list of various customs duties, dated 15 July 1507
Translation:

He that is a gauger ought to understand that there is in a tunne 60 sesters, and every sester is 4 gallons, be it wine or oil.

With the adoption of the Queen Anne wine gallon of 231 cubic inches in 1706, the tun approximated the volume of a cylinder with both diameter and height of 42 inches. (Note: The volume, V, of this cylinder may be approximated from the height, h, and the radius, r, as follows.: V / = πr^{2}h; V / ≈ 22/7×(21 in)^{2}×42 in / since π ≈ 22/7; V / = (2^{2}×3^{2}×7)×(3×7×11) cu in; V / = 252×231 cu in) These were adopted as the standard U.S. liquid gallon and tun.

When the imperial system was introduced in 1824, the tun was redefined in the UK and its colonies as 210 imperial gallons. The imperial tun remained evenly divisible by small integers. (Note: 210 = 2×3×5×7) There was also little change in the actual value of the tun. (Note: The imperial tun is only about 0.08% larger than the US tun under current definitions, as 5 imp gal ≈ 6 US gal.)

Standard tuns of wine came to serve as a measure of a ship's capacity.

	comparisons							historically	imperial definitions		US definitions	
measure	tuns	butts	puncheons	hogsheads	tierces	barrels	rundlets	litres (Note: The conversion to litres is approximate, and is given as a range to reflect the varying definitions of the gallon and the tun in terms of the gallon.)	gallons	litres (Note: The conversion to litres shown in tooltips is exact assuming the current 4.54609-litre definition of the imperial gallon.)	gallons	litres (Note: The conversion to litres shown in tooltips is exact assuming the current 25.4-millimetre definition of the international inch.)
tun	1	1/2	1/3	1/4	1/6	1/8	1/14	950–960	210	954.6789	252	953.923769568
butt	2	1	2/3	1/2	1/3	1/4	1/7	475–480	105	477.33945	126	476.961884784
puncheon	3	1 1/2	1	3/4	1/2	3/8	3/14	316–320	70	318.2263	84	317.974589856
hogshead	4	2	1 1/3	1	2/3	1/2	2/7	237–240	52 1/2	238.669725	63	238.480942392
tierce	6	3	2	1 1/2	1	3/4	3/7	158–160	35	159.11315	42	158.987294928
barrel	8	4	2 2/3	2	1 1/3	1	4/7	118–120	26 1/4	119.3348625	31 1/2	119.240471196
rundlet	14	7	4 2/3	3 1/2	2 1/3	1 3/4	1	68–69	15	68.19135	18	68.137412112

== Definitions ==
In the US customary system, the tun (symbol: US tu) is defined as 252 US fluid gallons, or exactly 953.923769568 litres.

In the imperial system, the tun is defined as 210 imperial gallons, or exactly 954.6789 litres.

== Conversions ==
Both the imperial and US tuns are subdivided into smaller units as follows.

1 tun	≡	2	butts or pipes
	≡	3	puncheons or tertians
	≡	4	wine hogsheads
	≡	6	tierces
	≡	8	wine barrels
	≡	14	rundlets
Conversions of the imperial tun are as follows.
1 imperial tun	≡	210	imperial gallons
	≡	840	imperial quarts
	≡	1680	imperial pints
	≡	954.6789	litres (Note: The conversion to litres is exact assuming the current 4.54609-litre definition of the imperial gallon.)
	≈	58258.0809	cubic inches
	≈	33.7142	cubic feet
	≈	1.2487	cubic yards
	≈	252.1995	US gallons
	≈	1008.7979	US liquid quarts
	≈	2017.5959	US liquid pints
	≈	866.9277	US dry quarts
	≈	1733.8553	US dry pints
Conversions of the US tun are as follows.
1 US tun	≡	252	US gallons
	≡	1008	US liquid quarts
	≡	2016	US liquid pints
	≡	953.9237769568	litres (Note: The conversion to litres is exact assuming the current 25.4-millimetre definition of the international inch.)
	≡	58212	cubic inches
	≡	33.6875	cubic feet
	≡	1 107/432	cubic yards
	≈	209.8339	imperial gallons
	≈	839.3356	imperial quarts
	≈	1678.6712	imperial pints
	≡	866 26014/107521	US dry quarts
	≡	1732 52028/107521	US dry pints

English wine cask units
gallon	rundlet	barrel	tierce	hogshead	puncheon, tertian	pipe, butt	tun	
							1	tun
						1	2	pipes, butts
					1	1 1/2	3	puncheons, tertians
				1	1 1/3	2	4	hogsheads
			1	1 1/2	2	3	6	tierces
		1	1 1/3	2	2 2/3	4	8	barrels
	1	1 3/4	2 1/3	3 1/2	4 2/3	7	14	rundlets
1	18	31 1/2	42	63	84	126	252	gallons (wine)
3.785	68.14	119.24	158.99	238.48	317.97	476.96	953.92	litres
1	15	26 1/4	35	52 1/2	70	105	210	gallons (imperial)
4.546	68.19	119.3	159.1	238.7	318.2	477.3	954.7	litres

== See also ==
- Tonelada
