= Butt (unit) =

Unit of liquid volume

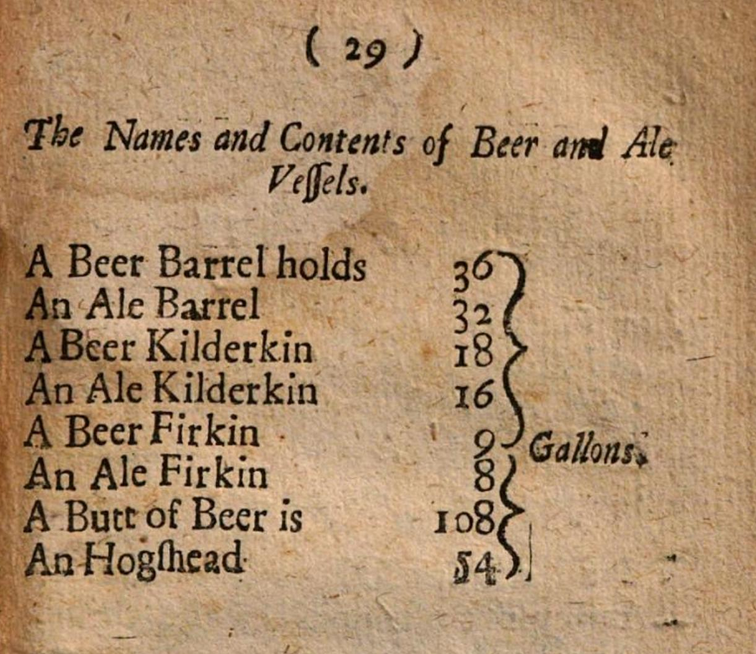
Names and contents of beer and ale vessels in James Lightbody's Every Man His Own Gauger, 1695

The butt is an obsolete English measure of liquid volume equalling two hogsheads, being between 450 and 1,060 litres (99 and 233 imp gal; 120 and 280 US gal) by various definitions.

== Equivalents ==
A butt approximately equated to 108 imperial gallons (130 US gallons; 491 litres) for ale or 105 imperial gallons (126 US gallons; 477 litres) for wine (also known as a pipe), although the Oxford English Dictionary notes that "these standards were not always precisely adhered to".

On one etymological theory, the word buttload originated from a load of liquid one butt in size, later becoming a more generic slang term meaning "a lot."

The butt is one in a series of English wine cask units, being half of a tun.

English wine cask units
| gallon | rundlet | barrel | tierce | hogshead | puncheon, tertian | pipe, butt | tun | |
|---|---|---|---|---|---|---|---|---|
| | | | | | | | 1 | tun |
| | | | | | | 1 | 2 | pipes, butts |
| | | | | | 1 | 1 1/2 | 3 | puncheons, tertians |
| | | | | 1 | 1 1/3 | 2 | 4 | hogsheads |
| | | | 1 | 1 1/2 | 2 | 3 | 6 | tierces |
| | | 1 | 1 1/3 | 2 | 2 2/3 | 4 | 8 | barrels |
| | 1 | 1 3/4 | 2 1/3 | 3 1/2 | 4 2/3 | 7 | 14 | rundlets |
| 1 | 18 | 31 1/2 | 42 | 63 | 84 | 126 | 252 | gallons (wine) |
| 3.785 | 68.14 | 119.24 | 158.99 | 238.48 | 317.97 | 476.96 | 953.92 | litres |
| 1 | 15 | 26 1/4 | 35 | 52 1/2 | 70 | 105 | 210 | gallons (imperial) |
| 4.546 | 68.19 | 119.3 | 159.1 | 238.7 | 318.2 | 477.3 | 954.7 | litres |

== See also ==
- English wine cask units#Pipe or butt
