= LBS =

LBS or lbs may refer to:

== Science and technology ==
- Plural abbreviation for the pound unit of mass
- Location-based service, software service using geographical location

== Organisations ==
- Landesbausparkasse, member banks of the Sparkassen-Finanzgruppe
- Lauder Business School, Vienna, Austria
- Lease Buyback Scheme, Singapore
- Lekki British School, Nigeria
- Lexington Broadcast Services Company, a former television production and syndication company
- Liberia Broadcasting System, a state-owned radio and television network
- Liberty Broadcasting System, a defunct national American radio network
- Liverpool Business School, England
- London Business School, of the University of London, England
- Louise Brooks Society, a film star fan club

== Other uses ==
- Labasa Airport, airport in Fiji
- Lal Bahadur Shastri, (1904–1966), former prime minister of India
- Legendary Banked Slalom, a snowboard race, Washington State, US
- Local bike shop, a small business
- London Borough of Southwark, UK
- London Borough of Sutton, UK
