= Louise Brooks Society =

Online archive devoted to the silent film star

The Louise Brooks Society is an online archive devoted to the silent film star Louise Brooks (1906–1985). The Louise Brooks Society, or LBS, was started in 1995 and launched on the web that same year. The stated goals of the LBS are to promote a greater awareness of the life and films of the celebrated actress, dancer, and writer.

The site's online archive contains roughly 200 pages of material – including extensive bibliographies, a filmography, a chronology, commentary, vintage articles, memorabilia, portrait galleries, links, and various contributions from its userbase.

The LBS bibliographies are its primary contribution to a growing body of scholarship concerning the actress.

The LBS also has a long-running blog, as well as its own online radio station, RadioLulu (which was part of Live365). Both were launched in 2002.

The LBS is credited in each edition of the reprinted versions of both the Louise Brooks' biography by Barry Paris and Brooks' own Lulu in Hollywood.

The society has also sponsored an exhibit at the San Francisco Public Library and elsewhere, co-sponsored events including screenings and lectures, "inspired" the documentary Louise Brooks: Looking for Lulu, and has been cited as a part of increased media interest in the actress.

The society has published five books, the "Louise Brooks edition" of Margarete Bohme's The Diary of a Lost Girl in 2010, Beggars of Life: A Companion to the 1928 Film and Now We're the Air: A Companion to the Once Lost Film in 2017, Louise Brooks, the Persistent Star, a collection of articles in 2018, and The Street of Forgotten Men: From Story to Screen and Beyond in 2023. The latter featured a foreword by Academy Award honoree Kevin Brownlow.

The efforts of the LBS has been written about in newspapers and magazines around the world including USA Today, The New York Times, The Times, The Guardian, Melbourne Age, Stuttgarter Zeitung, and Le Temps. In 2005, at the time of its 10th anniversary, the film historian Leonard Maltin praised the LBS on his website.
