= Tierce (unit) =

The tierce (also terse) is both an archaic volume unit of measure of goods and the name of the cask of that size. The most common definitions are either one-third of a pipe or forty-two gallons. In the petroleum industry - a barrel of oil is defined as 42 US gallons.

== Use ==
The casks were roughly 20.5 inches across and were built to hold either liquids (wet cooperage) or dry goods (dry cooperage). Contents ranged from sugar to rum to salted beef and fish.

English wine cask units
gallon	rundlet	barrel	tierce	hogshead	puncheon, tertian	pipe, butt	tun	
							1	tun
						1	2	pipes, butts
					1	1 1/2	3	puncheons, tertians
				1	1 1/3	2	4	hogsheads
			1	1 1/2	2	3	6	tierces
		1	1 1/3	2	2 2/3	4	8	barrels
	1	1 3/4	2 1/3	3 1/2	4 2/3	7	14	rundlets
1	18	31 1/2	42	63	84	126	252	gallons (wine)
3.785	68.14	119.24	158.99	238.48	317.97	476.96	953.92	litres
1	15	26 1/4	35	52 1/2	70	105	210	gallons (imperial)
4.546	68.19	119.3	159.1	238.7	318.2	477.3	954.7	litres

== History ==
The Oxford English Dictionary lists the first use of the term in this sense as occurring in 1531. In 1630, Ben Jonson, then the Poet Laureate of England, petitioned that the salary of the position be raised. His wish was granted, and in addition he and his successors received a tierce of wine from the Canary Islands, a tradition that continued until Henry James Pye became Laureate in 1790. As opposed to several other units of measure such as the pipe, cark and frail, the definition of the tierce remained stable with similar entries found in dictionaries from 1658 through 1780. By 1847, the introduction of steam technology allowed a 25-person manufacturing plant to make 15,000 tierce casks per year.

== Obsolescence ==
By 1899, proponents of the metric system could say that the tierce was one of many "marked curiosities and barbarisms" in America, and by 1917 even opponents of the metric system were calling this and similar measures obsolete: "Nobody hears nowadays of the coomb, the pottle, the chaldron, the palm or the barleycorn. The perch, the puncheon, the span, the tierce, and the toise are all but forgotten. Even the furlong, the gill, and the rod are disappearing."

== Recent research ==
Robert E. Hardwicke asked the question in his The Oilman's Barrel: why is oil measured in 42-gallon barrels? One hypothesis was that early oil drilling in Pennsylvania used tierce whiskey barrels for storage, and the standard developed from there. Ultimately, he was unable to find adequate support for the hypothesis.

Museum curator Mark Staniforth participated in the salvage operation of the 250-ton brig William Salthouse that was wrecked in 1841 near Queenscliff, Victoria, Australia. He made a detailed study of the recovered casks, noting that many of them did not meet legal standards for quality. His work provided empirical evidence of how tierce casks were actually constructed.

== See also ==
- English wine cask units
