= English brewery cask units =

Traditional English measurements for beer casks

In the British Empire, capacities of brewery casks were formerly measured and standardised according to a specific system of English units, which was originally based on the ale gallon of exactly 282 cubic inches (4.621152048 L) (or exactly 1 17/77 US gallons).

With the adoption of the imperial system in the United Kingdom and its colonies in 1824, these units were redefined in terms of the slightly smaller imperial gallon (of exactly 4.54609 L; 1.20095 US gal): the older units continued in use in the United States.

Historically, the terms beer and ale referred to distinct brews. (Note: The term beer was reserved for beer brewed with hops, whilst ale referred to beer brewed without hops) From the mid-15th century until 1803 in Britain, "ale" casks and "beer" casks differed in the number of gallons they contained.

== Units ==
=== Tun ===
The beer tun is equal to double the size of a butt: it is therefore exactly 981.95544 litres or approximately 34.67743 cubic feet. (Note: This assumes the current definition of the imperial gallon as exactly 4.54609 litres) This unit is exactly 1/35 larger than the wine tun.

=== Butt (imperial) ===
The butt of beer is equal to half a tun or two hogsheads, and is therefore exactly 490.97772 litres or approximately 17.33871 cubic feet. This unit is exactly 1/35 larger than the wine pipe or butt.

=== Puncheon ===
The puncheon of beer is equal to 1/3 of a tun, 2/3 of a butt or 1 1/3 hogsheads, and is therefore exactly 327.31848 litres or approximately 11.55914 cubic feet. This unit is exactly 1/35 larger than the wine puncheon.

=== Hogshead ===
The hogshead of beer and ale is equal to a quarter of a tun, half a butt, or three kilderkins. This unit is exactly 1/35 larger than the wine hogshead.

hogshead (ale)
In the mid-15th century, the ale hogshead was defined as 48 ale or beer gallons (221.8153 L). In 1688 the ale hogshead was redefined to be 51 ale or beer gallons (235.67875 L). In 1803 the ale hogshead was again redefined to be 54 ale or beer gallons (249.54221 L), equivalent to the beer hogshead.
hogshead (beer)
From the mid 15th century until 1824, the beer hogshead was defined as 54 ale or beer gallons.
hogshead (ale or beer) (imperial)
In the United Kingdom and its colonies, with the 1824 adoption of the imperial system, the ale or beer hogshead was redefined to be 54 imperial gallons. The ale or beer hogshead is therefore exactly 245.48886 litres or approximately 8.66936 cubic feet.

=== Barrel ===
The barrel of beer or ale is equal to two kilderkins or 2/3 of a beer or ale hogshead. This unit is exactly 13/35 larger than the wine barrel, and is also exactly 1/35 larger than the wine tierce.

barrel (Ale)
As with the hogshead, the ale barrel underwent various redefinitions. Initially 32 ale or beer gallons (147.9 L), it was redefined in 1688 as 34 ale or beer gallons (157.1 L), and again in 1803 as 36 ale or beer gallons (166.4 L).
barrel (Beer)
The beer barrel was defined as 36 ale or beer gallons until the adoption of the imperial system.
barrel (Ale or Beer) (Imperial)
The adoption of the imperial system saw the beer or ale barrel redefined to be 36 imperial gallons, which is exactly 163.65924 litres or approximately 5.77957 cubic feet.

=== Kilderkin ===
The kilderkin (from the Dutch for "small cask") is equal to half a barrel or two firkins.

kilderkin (ale)
The ale kilderkin likewise underwent various redefinitions. Initially 16 ale or beer gallons (73.94 L), it was redefined in 1688 as 17 ale or beer gallons (78.56 L) and again in 1803 as 18 ale or beer gallons (83.18 L).
kilderkin (beer)
Until the adoption of the imperial system, the beer kilderkin was defined as 18 ale or beer gallons.
kilderkin (ale or beer) (imperial)
With the adoption of the imperial system, the kilderkin was redefined to be 18 imperial gallons, which is exactly 81.82962 litres or approximately 2.88979 cubic feet.

This unit is exactly 13/35 larger than a wine kilderkin (half of a wine barrel or 1/16 of a wine tun, i.e. 13.125 imperial gallons or 15.75 US gallons), and is also exactly 20% larger than a rundlet.

The kilderkin is the unit of choice of CAMRA, the Campaign for Real Ale, for calculating beer quantities for beer festivals in the UK. Ales are usually delivered in firkins, while cider and other drinks are usually in boxes, bottles or other containers measured in gallons or litres, and all (except wine) are sold in pints or parts thereof. For CAMRA internal accounting, all are calculated in kilderkins. A kilderkin is a 144 pint container but there is not 144 pints of cask conditioned consumable beer in a kilderkin (see § Firkin below for explanation).

=== Firkin ===
The ale or beer firkin (from Middle Dutch vierdekijn meaning "fourth") is a quarter of an ale or beer barrel or half a kilderkin.

Casks in this size (themselves called firkins) are the most common container for cask ale.

firkin (ale)
From the mid 15th century until 1688, the ale firkin was defined as 8 ale or beer gallons (36.97 litres). In 1688, the ale firkin was redefined to be 8 1/2 ale or beer gallons (39.28 L). In 1803 ale firkin was again redefined to be 9 ale or beer gallons (41.59 L), equivalent to the beer firkin.
firkin (beer)
From the mid 15th century until 1824 the beer firkin was defined as 9 ale or beer gallons.
firkin (ale or beer) (imperial)
The beer or ale firkin was redefined to be 9 imperial gallons in 1824. It is therefore exactly 40.91481 litres or approximately 1.44489 cubic feet.

This unit is exactly 13/35 larger than a wine firkin (one-quarter of a wine barrel or 1/32 of a wine tun, i.e. 6.5625 imperial gallons or 7.875 US gallons), though firkin was also used as a name for the much larger wine puncheon (70 imperial gallons or 84 US gallons).

Most English cask conditioned beer bought by publicans is delivered in 72 pint containers (i.e. a 40.9 L or 9 imperial gallon firkin), but the volume of consumable beer in the container is far lower. For example a 72 pint container of Greene King IPA currently only has 66 "full" pints of consumable beer that can be sold or drunk: the other 6 pints are sediment, finings, beer stone, hops, proteins, or less than an imperial measure and therefore not consumable or saleable. HMRC does not charge duty on any portion of beer that cannot be consumed, and brewers should make a declaration to the first customer (i.e. publican) to inform them what are the actual duty paid contents of the beer so customers are fully aware of how much is being sold to them.

=== Pin (imperial) ===
A pin is equal to half a firkin, and is therefore exactly 20.457405 litres or approximately 0.722446 cubic feet.

This unit is exactly 13/35 larger than a wine pin (one-eighth of a wine barrel or 1/64 of a wine tun, i.e. 3.28125 imperial gallons or 3.9375 US gallons).

Plastic versions of these casks are known as "polypins" and are popular in homebrewing, the off-trade (deliveries for home consumption), and at beer festivals where non-standard beers are sold.

=== Gallon ===
Originally, a 282 cubic inch ale or beer gallon was used. With the adoption of the imperial system in the United Kingdom and its colonies, the system was redefined in terms of the imperial gallon from 1824.

== Chart ==
English brewery cask units
gallon	firkin	kilderkin	barrel	hogshead		Year designated
				1	hogsheads	
			1	1 1/2	barrels	
		1	2	3	kilderkins	
	1	2	4	6	firkins	
1	8	16	32	48	ale gallons	(1454)
= 4.621 L	= 36.97 L	= 73.94 L	= 147.9 L	= 221.8 L	ale gallons	(1454)
1	9	18	36	54	beer gallons	(1454)
= 4.621 L	= 41.59 L	= 83.18 L	= 166.4 L	= 249.5 L	beer gallons	(1454)
1	8 1/2	17	34	51	ale gallons	1688
= 4.621 L	= 39.28 L	= 78.56 L	= 157.1 L	= 235.7 L	ale gallons	1688
1	9	18	36	54	ale gallons	1803
= 4.621 L	= 41.59 L	= 83.18 L	= 166.4 L	= 249.5 L	ale gallons	1803
1	9	18	36	54	imperial gallons	1824
= 4.546 L	= 40.91 L	= 81.83 L	= 163.7 L	= 245.5 L	imperial gallons	1824

== See also ==
- English wine cask units
- List of unusual units of measurement
- Units of measurement
