= Moorsom System =

British method of calculating the tonnage of sailing ships

The Moorsom System is a method created in the United Kingdom of calculating the tonnage or cargo capacity of sailing ships as a basis for assessing harbour and other vessel fees. It was put into use starting in 1849 and became British law in 1854.

== Previous methods ==
Previous methods of calculating tonnage, such as Builder's Old Measurement, were not consistently applied. Additionally, the methods designed for sailing ships could not be applied appropriately or fairly to steamships. Substantial portions of a steamship were required for boilers, machinery and coal, thus limiting the proportion of the ship's space available for cargo.

== Moorsom commission ==
In 1849, the United Kingdom appointed a Commission with Mr George Moorsom as member and secretary to resolve these problems. The Commission determined that fees should be proportional to the earning capacity of the ship, whether for cargo or passengers.

The result was called The Moorsom System, which set forth the rules for the measurement of the internal volume of entire ship.

- The total internal volume in cubic feet (0.028 m^{3}) was divided by 100 to produce the gross register tonnage.
- Net register tonnage was the volume remaining after subtracting the volume of the space used for machinery and other non-revenue producing functions.

The Commission sought to avoid a significant change in the fees charged to an existing vessel when the new system was implemented.

George Moorsom ordered the entire fleet of British merchant ships to be measured according to the new System and then divided the total gross tonnage by the total registered tonnage.

The result was 98.22 cubic feet (2.781 m^{3}) per gross ton, which was rounded to 100 cu ft (2.8 m^{3}) per ton.

== International Convention ==
While the rules for measuring ships changed over the years, the standard of 100 cu ft (2.8 m^{3}) per ton remained in effect until a new system was established by The International Convention on the Tonnage Measurement of Ships (ITC 1969), effective for new ships in July 1982.
