= English wine cask units =

Traditional volume measurement units for wine

Capacities of wine casks were formerly measured and standardised according to a specific system of English units.

The various units were historically defined in terms of the wine gallon so varied according to the definition of the gallon until the adoption of the Queen Anne wine gallon in 1706. In the United Kingdom and its colonies, the units were redefined with the introduction of the imperial system in 1826, whilst the Queen Anne wine gallon was adopted as the standard US gallon in 1836.

The major wine producing countries use barrels extensively and have developed standards at variance with the traditional English volumes: examples include a hogshead of 300 L (66 imp gal; 79 US gal), a barrique of 220 L (48 imp gal; 58 US gal) (Bordeaux), a barrel of 225 L (49 imp gal; 59 US gal) (Australia), a barrel of 230 L (51 imp gal; 61 US gal) (Burgundy) and a puncheon of 465 L (102 imp gal; 123 US gal).

== Casks ==
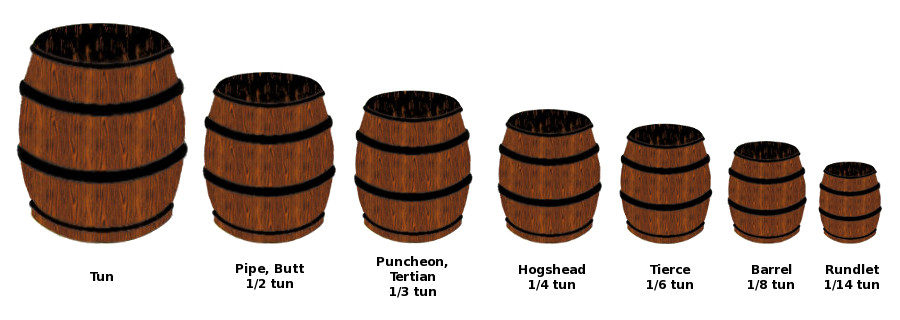

=== Tun ===
The tun (Old English: tunne, Latin: tunellus, Middle Latin: tunna) is an English unit of liquid volume (not weight), used for measuring wine, oil or honey. It is typically a large vat or vessel, most often holding 252 wine gallons, but occasionally other sizes (e.g. 256, 240 and 208 gallons) were also used.

=== Pipe or butt ===
The butt (from the medieval French and Italian botte) or pipe is half a tun, or exactly 105 imperial gallons (477.33945 L).

Tradition has it that George, Duke of Clarence, the brother of Edward IV of England, was drowned in a butt of malmsey on 18 February 1478. When James VI and I sailed to Norway in October 1589, his provisions included a pipe of sack. In Edgar Allan Poe's short story "The Cask of Amontillado", the narrator claims he has received "a pipe of what passes for Amontillado".

=== Puncheon or tertian ===
The puncheon is a third of a tun. The term puncheon, shortened to pon in the United States. The unit was also known as a tertian (from the Latin word for "third").

=== Hogshead ===
Of comparable size to the beer hogshead, the wine hogshead is equal to half a butt or a quarter of a tun.

=== Tierce ===
Closely related to the modern oil barrel, the tierce is half a puncheon, a third of a butt, or a sixth of a tun.

=== Barrel ===
The wine barrel is half a wine hogshead or an eighth of a tun.

=== Rundlet ===
The rundlet is a seventh of a butt or a fourteenth of a tun.

== History ==
Originally, the tun was defined as 256 wine gallons. (Note: 256=2^{8}) (This was the basis for calling 64 gallons a quarter.) At some time before the 15th century, it was reduced to 252 gallons, so as to be evenly divisible by other small integers, including seven. (Note: 252 = 2^{2}×3^{2}×7) Note that a 252-gallon tun of wine has a mass of approximately 2,060 lb (930 kg), between a short ton (2,000 lb (910 kg)) and a long ton (2,240 lb (1,020 kg)).

The tun is the approximate volume of a cylinder with both diameter and height of 42 in (110 cm), as the US gallon was originally a cylinder 7 by 6 in (180 by 150 mm) (diameter × height). (Note: The volume, V, of this cylinder may be approximated from the height, h, and the radius, r, as follows.: V / = πr^{2}h; V / ≈ 22/7×(21 in)^{2}×42 in / since π ≈ 22/7; V / = (2^{2}×3^{2}×7)×(3×7×11) cu in; V / = 252×231 cu in) The Queen Anne wine gallon of 231 cubic inches was adopted in 1707, and still serves as the definition of the US gallon. A US tun is thus the volume of a rectangular cuboid with dimensions 36 by 38.5 by 42 in (91 by 98 by 107 cm).

When the imperial system was introduced, the tun was redefined in the UK and its colonies as 210 imperial gallons, meaning the imperial tun remained evenly divisible by small integers, (Note: 210 = 2×3×5×7) and there was also little change in the actual value of the tun. (Note: The imperial tun is only about 0.08% larger than the US tun assuming current definitions, since 5 imp gal ≈ 6 US gal.)

	comparisons							historically	imperial definitions		US definitions	
measure	tuns	butts	puncheons	hogsheads	tierces	barrels	rundlets	litres (Note: The conversion to litres is approximate, and is given as a range to reflect the varying definitions of the gallon and the tun in terms of the gallon.)	gallons	litres (Note: The conversion to litres shown in tooltips is exact assuming the current 4.54609-litre definition of the imperial gallon.)	gallons	litres (Note: The conversion to litres shown in tooltips is exact assuming the current 25.4-millimetre definition of the international inch.)
tun	1	1/2	1/3	1/4	1/6	1/8	1/14	950–960	210	954.6789	252	953.923769568
butt	2	1	2/3	1/2	1/3	1/4	1/7	475–480	105	477.33945	126	476.961884784
puncheon	3	1 1/2	1	3/4	1/2	3/8	3/14	316–320	70	318.2263	84	317.974589856
hogshead	4	2	1 1/3	1	2/3	1/2	2/7	237–240	52 1/2	238.669725	63	238.480942392
tierce	6	3	2	1 1/2	1	3/4	3/7	158–160	35	159.11315	42	158.987294928
barrel	8	4	2 2/3	2	1 1/3	1	4/7	118–120	26 1/4	119.3348625	31 1/2	119.240471196
rundlet	14	7	4 2/3	3 1/2	2 1/3	1 3/4	1	68–69	15	68.19135	18	68.137412112

== See also ==
=== Economic ===
- Economy of England
- Food and drink industry in England

=== Liquors ===
- English whisky
- Gin
- List of whisky distilleries in England

=== Wine ===
- Barrel
- Barrel (unit)
- Cubic ton
- English brewery cask units
- English sparkling wine
- List of unusual units of measurement
- Tonnage
- Units of measurement
