= Wine gallon =

Obsolete English measure of volume

A wine gallon is a unit of capacity that was used routinely in England as far back as the 14th century, and by statute under Queen Anne since 1706.

While Britain abolished the wine gallon in 1826 when it adopted imperial units for measurement, the 1706 wine gallon is the basis of the United States' gallon, as well as other measures, with the U.S. legally adopting the wine gallon in 1836.

The Imperial gallon was defined with yet another set of temperature and pressure values (62 °F (17 °C) and 30.0 inHg (102 kPa)).

To convert a number of Imperial gallons to the equivalent number of wine gallons, multiply by 1.20095, and to convert a number of wine gallons to the equivalent number of Imperial gallons, multiply by 0.832674.

Some research speculates that the wine gallon was originally meant to hold eight troy pounds of wine. The 1706 Queen Anne statute defines the wine gallon as exactly 231 cubic inches (3.79 L) – e.g. a cylinder 7 inches (178 mm) in diameter and 6 inches (152 mm) high (Note: π is often approximated as 3 1/7.) – and was used to measure the volume of wine and other commercial liquids, such as cooking oils and honey.

A 14th-century barrel of wine contained 31.5 US gal (119.240471196 L), which is one-eighth of the wine tun of 252 U.S. gallons (954 L or 210 imperial gallons).

== See also ==
- Gallon
