= Hogshead =

Unit of volume for tobacco, wine or beer

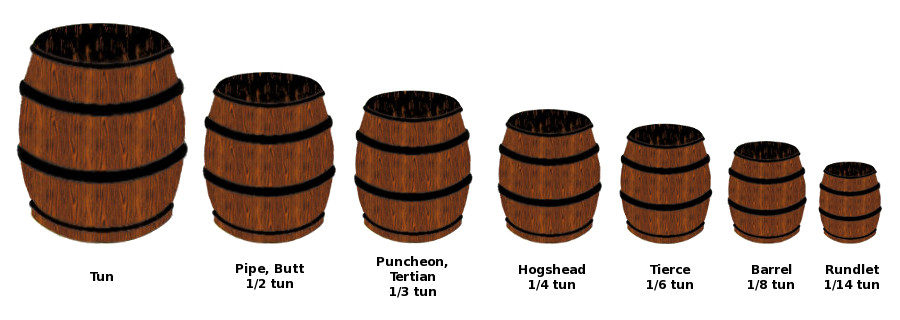
A hogshead in relation to other barrels

A hogshead (abbreviated "hhd", plural "hhds") is a large cask of liquid (or, less often, of a food commercial product) for manufacturing and sale. It refers to a specified volume, measured in either imperial or US customary measures, primarily applied to alcoholic beverages, such as wine, ale, or cider.

== Etymology ==
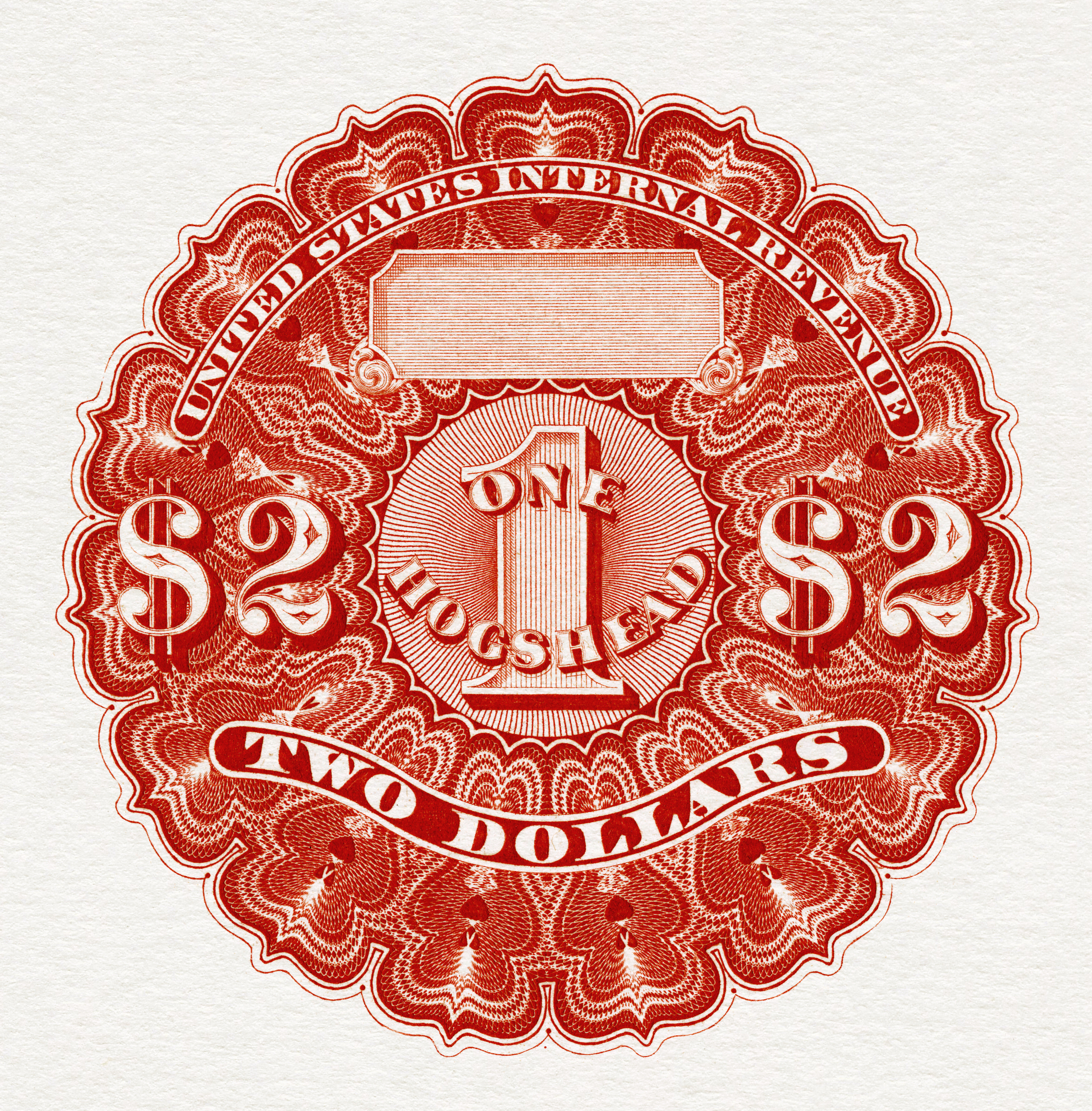
United States revenue stamp (proof) for the $2 tax on one hogshead of beer in 1867.

English philologist Walter William Skeat (1835–1912) noted the origin is to be found in the name for a cask or liquid measure appearing in various forms in Germanic languages, in Dutch oxhooft (modern okshoofd), Danish oxehoved, Old Swedish oxhuvud, etc. The Encyclopædia Britannica of 1911 conjectured that the word should therefore be oxhead, hogshead being a mere corruption.

== Varieties and standardisation ==
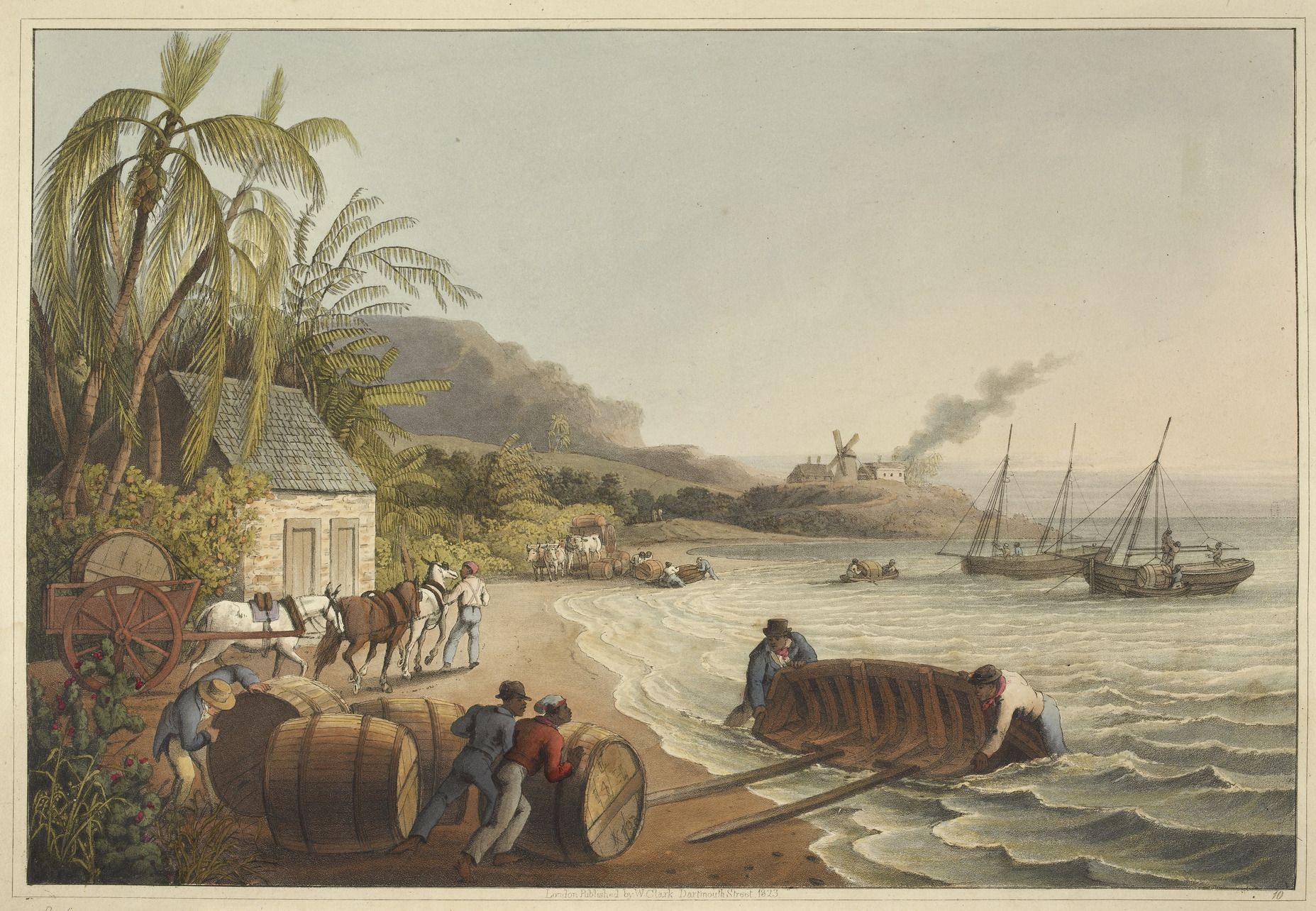
"Sugar hogsheads" from Ten Views in the Island of Antigua, W. Clark, 1823, plate X.

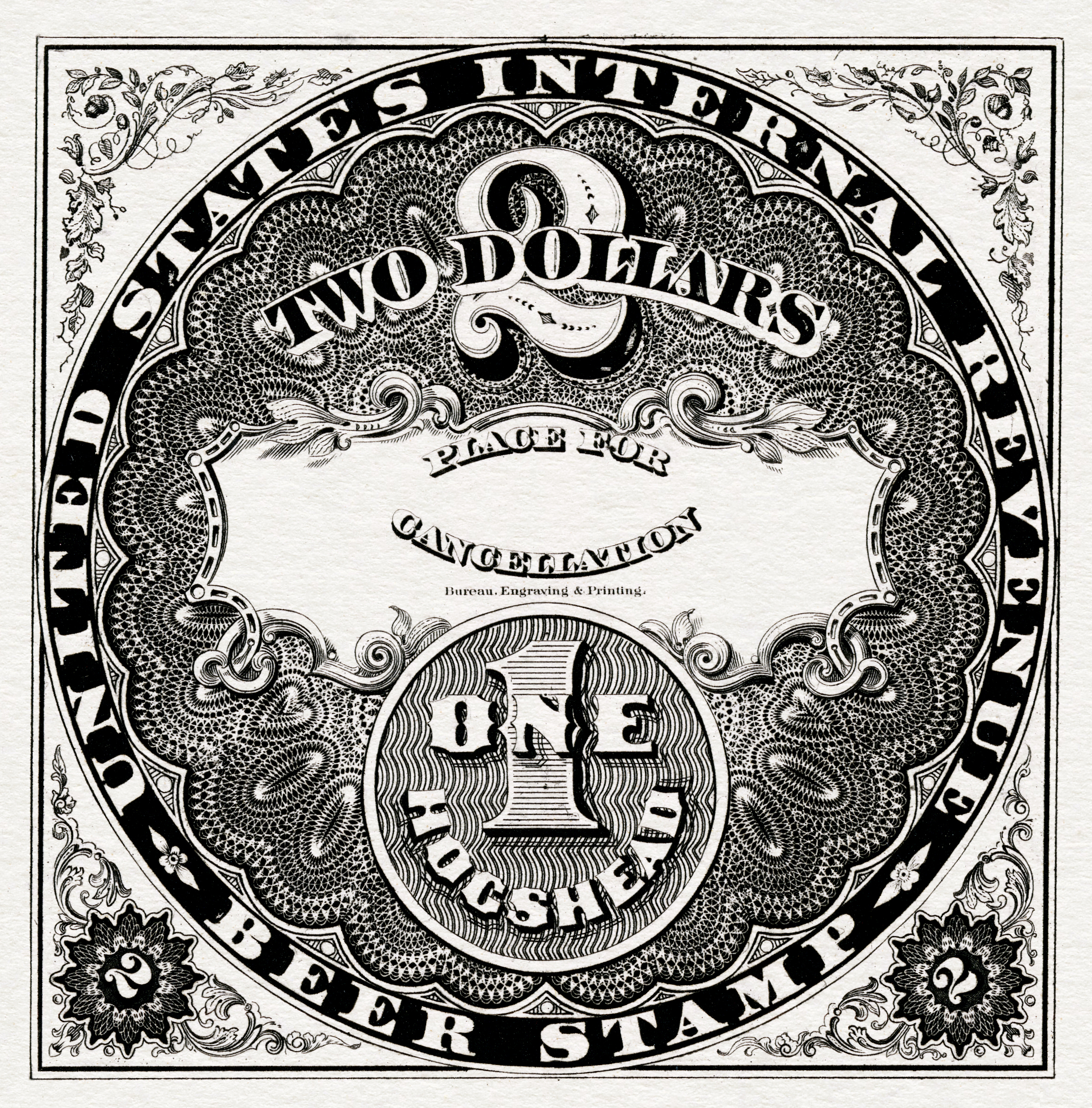
1870 United States $2 beer revenue stamp on 1 hogshead.

A tobacco hogshead was used in British and American colonial times to transport and store tobacco. It was a very large wooden barrel. A standardized hogshead measured 48 inches (122 cm) long and 30 inches (76 cm) in diameter at the head (at least 550 L or 121 imp gal or 145 US gal, depending on the width in the middle). Fully packed with tobacco, it weighed about 1,000 pounds (450 kg).

A hogshead in Britain contains about 300 L (66 imp gal; 79 US gal).

The Oxford English Dictionary (OED) notes that the hogshead was first standardized by an act of Parliament (2 Hen. 6. c. 14) in 1423, though the standards continued to vary by locality and content. For example, the OED cites an 1897 edition of Whitaker's Almanack, which specified the gallons of wine in a hogshead varying most particularly across fortified wines: claret/Madeira 46 imperial gallons (55 US gal; 209 L), port 57 imperial gallons (68 US gal; 259 L), sherry 54 imperial gallons (65 US gal; 245 L). The American Heritage Dictionary claims that a hogshead can consist of anything from (presumably) 62.5 to 140 US gallons (52 to 117 imp gal; 237 to 530 L). A hogshead of Madeira wine was approximately equal to 45–48 gallons (205–218 L). A hogshead of brandy was approximately equal to 56–61 gallons (255–277 L).

Eventually, a hogshead of wine came to be 52.5 imperial gallons (238.7 L; 63.0 US gal), while a hogshead of beer or ale came to be 54 US gal (200 L; 45 imp gal) using the pre-1824 beer and ale gallon, or 245 L to the imperial gallon).

A hogshead was also used as a unit of measurement for sugar in Louisiana for most of the 19th century. Plantations were listed in sugar schedules by the number of hogsheads of sugar or molasses produced. Used for sugar in the 18th and 19th centuries in the British West Indies, a hogshead weighed on average 1,792 pounds (813 kg). A hogshead was also used for the measurement of herring fished in sardines in Blacks Harbour, New Brunswick and Cornwall.

== Whisky maturation ==
Hogsheads are a common form of cask used for maturing Scotch Whisky, typically with a volume of around 250 litres.

These casks are usually made from the staves of ex-Bourbon or Tennessee whiskey casks, which are plentiful due to US law requiring a new barrel for each batch of whiskey. The staves will be mated to new, larger heads which results in a higher volume - this means that five whiskey barrels are needed to make four hogsheads as the circumference is greater.

Using just the staves means that barrels can be shipped across the Atlantic in their component parts, which is much more space-efficient than shipping barrels whole. The new heads may be of American white oak similar to the recycled staves, or may be of other woods such as European or Mizunara oak.

== Charts ==
English wine cask units
gallon	rundlet	barrel	tierce	hogshead	puncheon, tertian	pipe, butt	tun	
							1	tun
						1	2	pipes, butts
					1	1 1/2	3	puncheons, tertians
				1	1 1/3	2	4	hogsheads
			1	1 1/2	2	3	6	tierces
		1	1 1/3	2	2 2/3	4	8	barrels
	1	1 3/4	2 1/3	3 1/2	4 2/3	7	14	rundlets
1	18	31 1/2	42	63	84	126	252	gallons (wine)
3.785	68.14	119.24	158.99	238.48	317.97	476.96	953.92	litres
1	15	26 1/4	35	52 1/2	70	105	210	gallons (imperial)
4.546	68.19	119.3	159.1	238.7	318.2	477.3	954.7	litres

English brewery cask units
gallon	firkin	kilderkin	barrel	hogshead		Year designated
				1	hogsheads	
			1	1 1/2	barrels	
		1	2	3	kilderkins	
	1	2	4	6	firkins	
1	8	16	32	48	ale gallons	(1454)
= 4.621 L	= 36.97 L	= 73.94 L	= 147.9 L	= 221.8 L	ale gallons	(1454)
1	9	18	36	54	beer gallons	(1454)
= 4.621 L	= 41.59 L	= 83.18 L	= 166.4 L	= 249.5 L	beer gallons	(1454)
1	8 1/2	17	34	51	ale gallons	1688
= 4.621 L	= 39.28 L	= 78.56 L	= 157.1 L	= 235.7 L	ale gallons	1688
1	9	18	36	54	ale gallons	1803
= 4.621 L	= 41.59 L	= 83.18 L	= 166.4 L	= 249.5 L	ale gallons	1803
1	9	18	36	54	imperial gallons	1824
= 4.546 L	= 40.91 L	= 81.83 L	= 163.7 L	= 245.5 L	imperial gallons	1824

== See also ==
- English units of wine casks
