= Gallon =

Units of volume

gallon
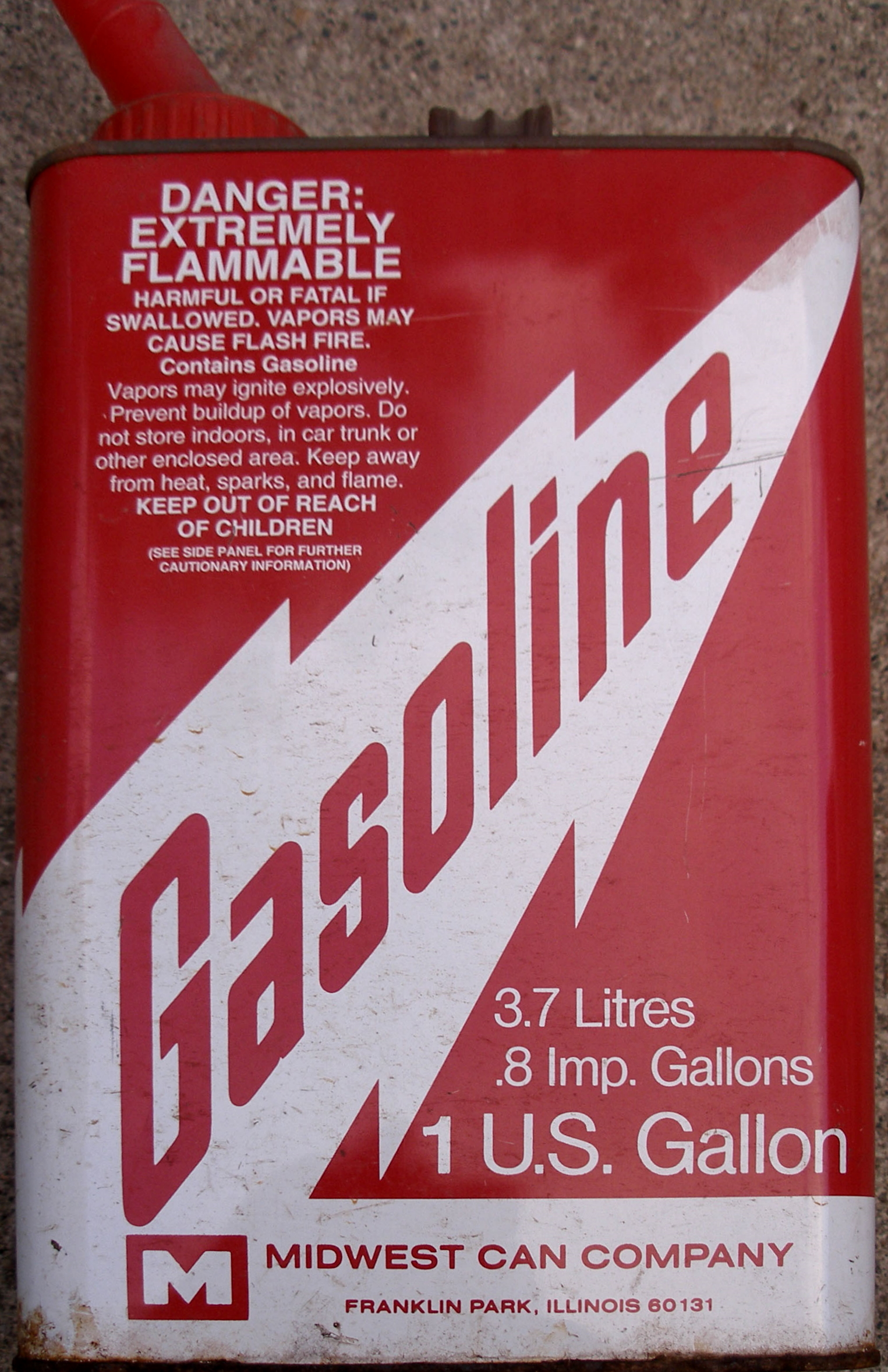
- A 1-US-gallon gasoline can showing "U.S. Gallon" marking (for American use), imperial gallons (for some Caribbean countries' and territories' use), and litres (for Canadian use)

General information
- Unit of: Volume
- Symbol: gal

Conversions (imperial)
1 imp gal in ...	... is equal to ...
- Non-SI units mentioned in the SI: 4.54609 L
- US customary units: ≈ 1.200950 US gal
- US customary units: ≈ 277.41943 in^{3}

Conversions (US)
1 US gal in ...	... is equal to ...
- Non-SI units: 3.785411784 L
- Imperial units: ≈ 0.8326742 imp gal
- Imperial units: 231 in^{3}

The gallon is a unit of volume in British imperial units and United States customary units.

The imperial gallon (imp gal) is defined as 4.54609 litres, and is or was used in the United Kingdom and its former colonies, including Ireland, Canada, Australia, New Zealand, India, South Africa, Malaysia and some Caribbean countries, while the US gallon (US gal) is defined as 231 cubic inches (3.785411784 L), and is used in the United States and some Latin American and Caribbean countries.

There are four gills in a pint, two pints in a quart, and four quarts (quarter gallons) in a gallon, with the imperial gill being divided into five imperial fluid ounces and the US gill being divided into four US fluid ounces: this, and a slight difference in the sizes of the imperial fluid ounce and the US fluid ounce, give different sizes for the imperial gallon and US gallon.

The IEEE standard symbol for both the imperial and US gallons is gal, not to be confused with the gal (symbol: Gal), a CGS unit of acceleration.

== Definitions ==
The gallon has two definitions, one in the imperial system and another in the US customary system.

Historically, there were many definitions and redefinitions: see § Sizes of gallons for details.

=== Imperial gallon ===
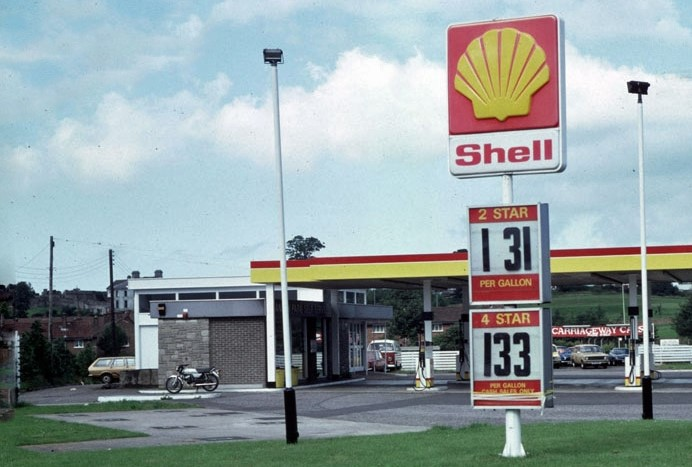
A Shell petrol station selling 2* and 4* (leaded petrol) by the gallon in the UK, circa 1980

Until 1976 a British imperial gallon (frequently called simply "gallon") was defined as the volume of 10 pounds of water at 62 °F (16.7 °C). Since then the gallon has been defined as 4.54609 L.

There are four imperial quarts in a gallon, two imperial pints in a quart, and 20 imperial fluid ounces in an imperial pint, making an imperial fluid ounce 1/160 of an imperial gallon.

=== US gallon ===
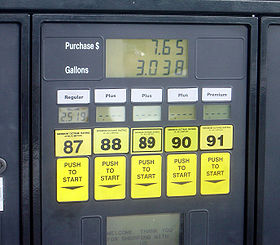
A fuel station in the United States displaying fuel prices per US gallon

The US gallon (frequently called a "gallon") is legally defined as exactly 231 cubic inches, i.e. 3.785411784 litres.

A US gallon contains 3.785411784 kg (8.3454 lb) of water at 3.983 °C (39.169 °F), making it 83.26742% of an imperial gallon.

There are four quarts in a gallon, two pints in a quart and 16 US fluid ounces in a US pint, making the US fluid ounce 1/128 of a US gallon.

In order to overcome the effects of expansion and contraction with temperature when using a gallon to specify a quantity of material for purposes of trade, it is common to define the temperature at which the material will occupy the specified volume. For example, the volume of petroleum products and alcoholic beverages are both referenced to 60 °F (15.6 °C) in government regulations.

== Worldwide usage ==
Gasoline units used in the world: Litre US gallon Imperial gallon No data

=== Imperial gallon ===
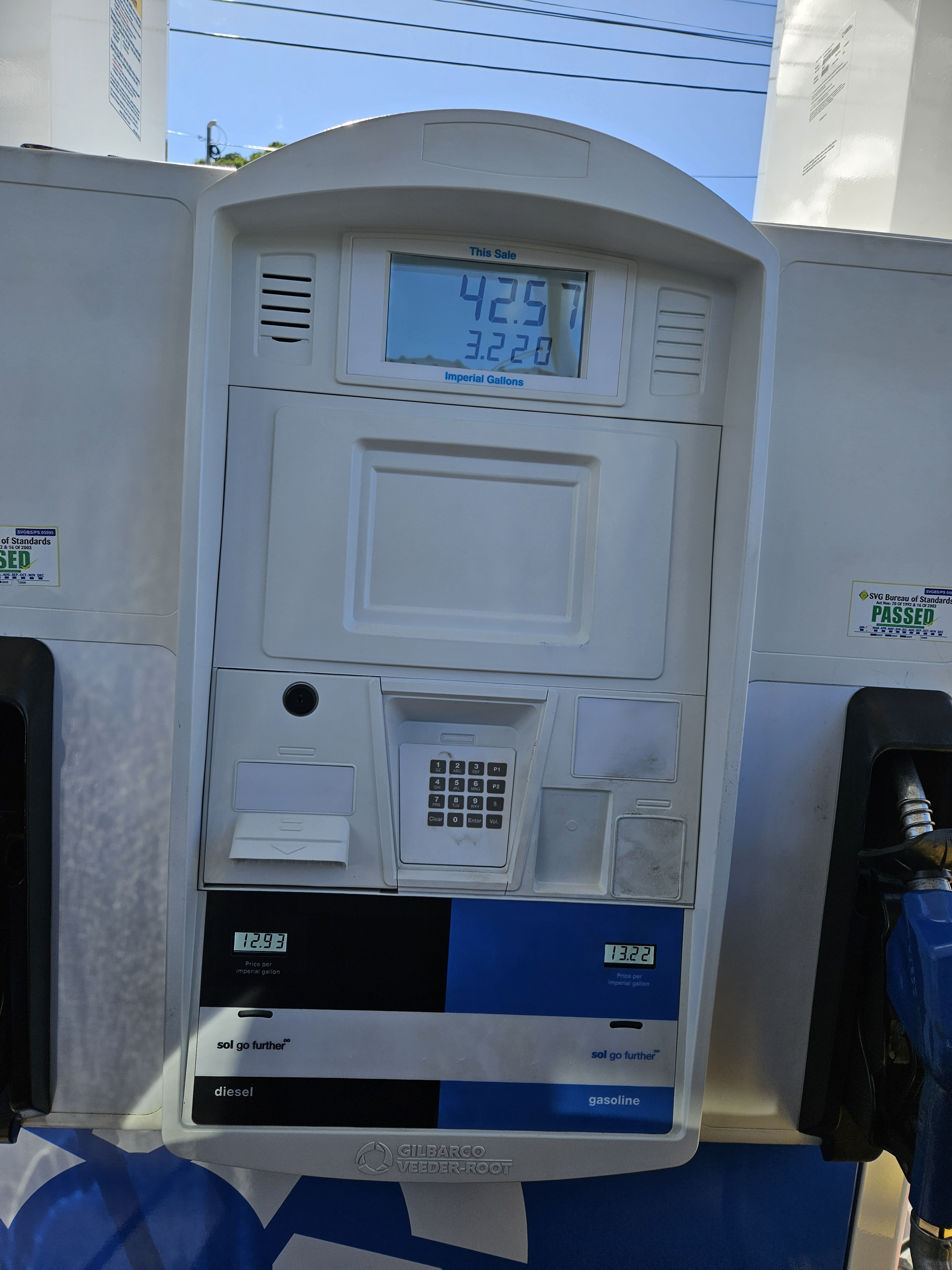
A fuel station in St Vincent and the Grenadines displaying prices in Eastern Caribbean dollars per imperial gallon

The imperial gallon continues to be used as the standard petrol unit in four British Overseas Territories (Anguilla, the British Virgin Islands, the Cayman Islands, and Montserrat), and four countries (Antigua and Barbuda, Grenada, Saint Lucia, and Saint Vincent and the Grenadines).

The United Arab Emirates ceased selling petrol by the imperial gallon in 2010 and switched to the litre, with Guyana following suit in 2013. The Dubai Electricity and Water Authority switched Dubai's water billing from imperial gallons to cubic metres in March 2025.

In 2014, Myanmar switched from the imperial gallon to the litre.

Antigua and Barbuda has proposed switching to selling petrol by litres since 2015.

In the European Union, the gallon was removed from the list of legally defined primary units of measure catalogue in the EU directive 80/181/EEC for trading and official purposes, effective from 31 December 1994. Under the directive the gallon could still be used, but only as a supplementary or secondary unit.

As a result of the EU directive, Ireland and the United Kingdom passed legislation to replace the gallon with the litre as a primary unit of measure in trade and in the conduct of public business, effective from 31 December 1993 and 30 September 1995, respectively. Though the gallon has ceased to be a primary unit of trade, it can still be legally used in both the UK and Ireland as a supplementary unit.

Miles per imperial gallon is used as the primary fuel economy unit in the United Kingdom and as a supplementary unit in Canada on official documentation.

=== US gallon ===
Gasoline is sold by the US gallon in four US territories (American Samoa, the Northern Mariana Islands, Guam, and the US Virgin Islands) and in ten countries:

- six countries in the Americas: Colombia, Ecuador, Guatemala, Haiti, Peru, and the United States;
- three associated states of the United States Pacific Ocean countries: Marshall Islands, the Federated States of Micronesia, and Palau; and
- the African country Liberia, a former protectorate of the United States.

=== Both imperial and US gallon ===
Both the imperial gallon and the US gallon are used in the Turks and Caicos Islands, due to an increase in tax duties which was disguised by levying the same duty on the US gallon (3.79 L) as was previously levied on the imperial gallon (4.55 L), and the Bahamas.

=== Legacy ===
In some parts of the Middle East, such as the United Arab Emirates and Bahrain, 18.9-litre water cooler bottles are marketed as five-gallon bottles.

== Relationship to other units ==
Both the US gallon and imperial gallon are divided into four quarts (quarter gallons), which in turn are divided into two pints, which in turn are divided into two cups (not in customary use outside the US), which in turn are further divided into two gills. Thus, both gallons are equal to four quarts, eight pints, or thirty-two gills.

There is a difference in that the imperial gill is divided into five fluid ounces, whereas the US gill is divided into four fluid ounces: this means that an imperial fluid ounce is 1/20 of an imperial pint or 1/160 of an imperial gallon, while a US fluid ounce is 1/16 of a US pint or 1/128 of a US gallon.

As an imperial fluid ounce is 96.076% of a US fluid ounce, this means that one imperial gallon, quart, pint, cup and gill are all equal to 1.20095 of their US counterparts.

Historically, a common bottle size for liquor in the US was the "fifth", i.e. one-fifth of a US gallon (or 0.08% more than a "reputed quart", one-sixth of an imperial gallon). While spirit sales in the US were switched to metric measures in 1976, a 750 mL bottle is still sometimes known as a "fifth".

=== US dry gallon ===
The US dry gallon was defined as one-eighth of a US Winchester bushel of exactly 2,150.42 cubic inches, i.e. 268.8025 cubic inches or 4.40488377086 L.

The US dry gallon is no longer used, and is no longer included in the relevant statute, which goes from the dry quart to the peck.

== History ==
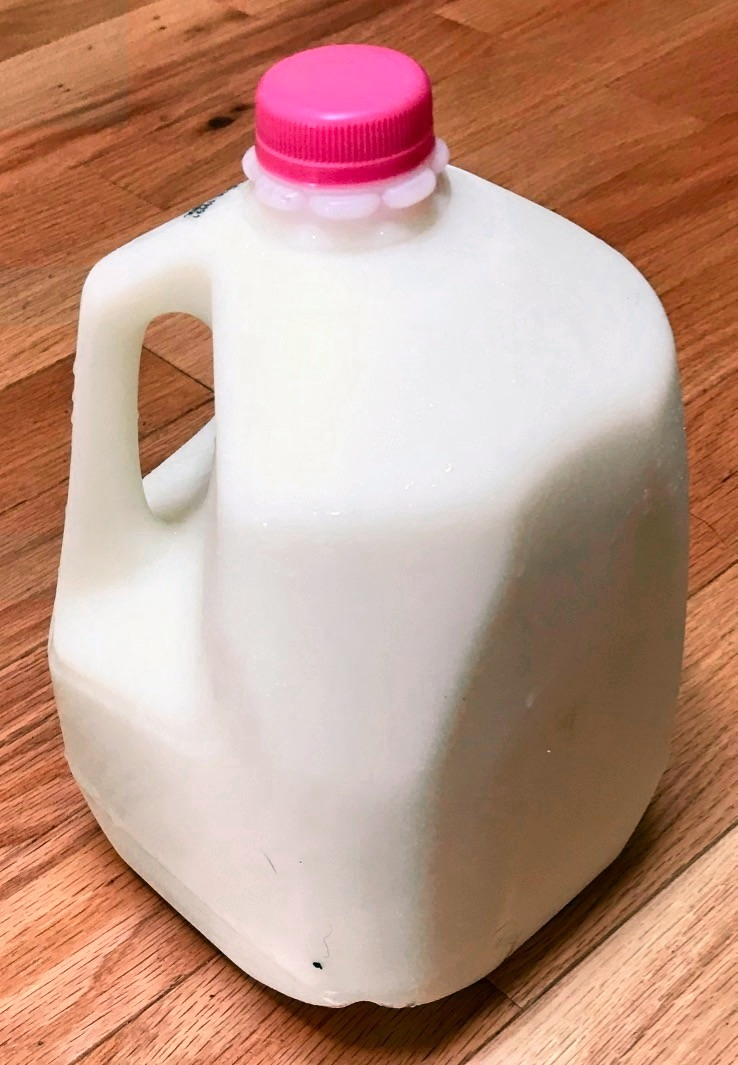
An American milk bottle with a volume of one US gallon

The term derives most immediately from galun, galon in Old Norman French, but the usage was common in several languages, for example jale in Old French and gęllet (bowl) in Old English. This suggests a common origin in Romance Latin, but the ultimate source of the word is unknown. Gallonage is the term used for a capacity or amount measured in gallons.

The gallon originated as the basis of systems for measuring wine and beer in England. The sizes of gallon used in these two systems were different from each other: the first was based on the wine gallon (equal in size to the US gallon), and the second was based on the ale gallon (1.65% larger than the imperial gallon).

By the end of the 18th century, there were three definitions of the gallon in common use:

- The corn gallon (or Winchester gallon) of about 268.8025 cubic inches (≈4.404884 L),
- The wine gallon (or Queen Anne's gallon) of 231 cubic inches (3.785411784 L), and
- The ale gallon of 282 cubic inches (4.621152048 L).

The corn or dry gallon was used in the United States for grain and other dry commodities until the 1990s. It was one-eighth of the (Winchester) bushel, originally defined as a cylindrical measure of 18 1/2 inches in diameter and 8 inches in depth, which made the bushel 8 in × (9 1/4 in)^{2} × π ≈ 2150.42017 cubic inches. The bushel was later redefined to be 2150.42 cubic inches exactly, thus making its gallon exactly 268.8025 in^{3} (4.40488377086 L); in previous centuries, there had been a corn gallon of between 271 and 272 cubic inches.

The wine gallon was legally adopted as the standard US gallon in 1836. Some sources relate this to the volume occupied by eight medieval merchants' pounds of wine: this was at one time defined as the volume of a cylinder 6 inches deep and 7 inches in diameter, i.e. 6 in × (3 1/2 in)^{2} × π ≈ 230.90706 cubic inches. It was redefined in 1706 during the reign of Queen Anne as being exactly 231 in^{3}, the earlier definition with π being approximated as 22/7.

$$\pi r^2h \approx \frac{22}{7}\times\left ( \frac{7 ~ \mathrm{in}}{2} \right )^2\times6 ~ \mathrm{in} = 231 ~ \mathrm{in}^3.$$

Although the wine gallon had been used for centuries for import duty purposes, there was no legal standard of it in the Exchequer, and a smaller gallon of 224 in^{3} (3.670702336 L) was actually in use, which required this statute to resolve these issues: 231 in^{3} remains the definition of a gallon in the US today.

In 1824, Britain adopted the imperial gallon, and abolished all other gallons in favour of it. The imperial gallon was defined as the volume of 10 pounds of distilled water weighed in air with brass weights with the barometer standing at 30 inches of mercury (100 kilopascals; 15 pounds per square inch) and at a temperature of 62 °F (16.7 °C), which was calculated as 277.274 in^{3} (or 4.543706784 L to ten significant figures).

This value lasted until 1889, when an order in council of November 28 of that year redefined the imperial gallon as 277.463 in^{3} (or 4.546803939 L to ten significant figures).

In 1963, the definition was again refined as the space occupied by 10 pounds of distilled water of density 0.998859 g/mL weighed in air of density 0.001217 g/mL against weights of density 8.136 g/mL (the original "brass" was refined as the densities of brass alloys vary depending on metallurgical composition), which was calculated as 4.546091879 L (≈ 277.41955 in^{3}) to ten significant figures.

The definition of exactly 4.54609 cubic decimetres (also 4.54609 L or ≈ 277.41943 in^{3}) came after the litre was redefined in 1964: this value was adopted shortly afterwards in Canada, and was adopted in 1976 in the United Kingdom.

=== Sizes of gallons ===
Historically, gallons of various sizes were used in many parts of Western Europe. In these localities, it has been replaced as the unit of capacity by the litre.

Comparison of gallons
Volume		Definition	Inverted volume (gal/cu ft)	Weight as water at 62 °F (17 °C) (pounds/gal)	Cylindrical approximation		
(cu in)	(dm^{3})	Definition	Inverted volume (gal/cu ft)	Weight as water at 62 °F (17 °C) (pounds/gal)	Diameter (in)	Height (in)	Volume rel. error (%)
Current gallons
231	3.785411784	Statute of 5 Queen Anne (1706); UK wine gallon US gallon (legally adopted 1836 US)	7 37/77	8.3454	7	6	0.04
≈ 277.41943	4.54609	Imperial gallon (adopted 1964 Canada, adopted 1976 UK)	6.2288	10.0224	5 2/3	11	0.0002
Historic gallons
216 (Roman unciae)	3.539605824	Roman congius	8	7.8035	5	11	0.01
217	3.555992888	Irish gallon (1495, re-confirmed 1736)	7 209/217	7.8396	5.25	10	0.24
224	3.670702336	Preserved at the Guildhall, London (old UK wine gallon)	7 5/7	8.0925	9	3.5	0.6
≈ 241.3549	3.955093289	Jersey gallon (1562)	7.1596	8.7195	6.5	7.25	0.32
≈ 260.3235	4.265931799	Guernsey gallon (17th-century origins until 1917)	6.6379	9.4048	5	13.25	0.06
264.8	4.3392945472	Ancient Rumford quart (1228)	6 174/331	9.5665	7.5	6	0.1
265.5	4.350765492	Exchequer (Henry VII, 1497, with rim)	6 30/59	9.5918	13	2	0.01
266.25	4.36305579	Ancient Rumford (1228)	6 174/355	9.6189	5.5	11.25	0.39
268.4	4.398342075	Henry VII (Winchester) corn gallon (1497)	6 294/671	9.6966	6	9.5	0.08
268.8025	4.40488377086	Winchester, statute of 13 & 14 William III; Corn gallon US dry gallon (no longer used, no longer listed in the relevant statute)	6 46074/107521	9.7111	18.5	1	0.00001
270	4.42450728	Elizabeth I corn gallon (1601)	6.4	9.7544	5	13.75	0.0072
271	4.440894344	Exchequer (1601, E.) (old corn gallon)	6 102/271	9.7905	4.5	17	0.23
272	4.457281408	William III corn gallon (1688)	6 6/17	9.8266	6	9.625	0.05
277.202578125	4.542536388699375	Statute of 12 Anne (coal gallon), also equal to 1 1/32 corn gallons	6.2337	10.0146	5 2/3	11	0.08
277.274	4.543706784	Imperial gallon, as originally determined in 1824	6.2321	10.0172	5 2/3	11	0.05
≈ 277.41955	4.546091879	Imperial gallon as re-determined in 1895 and defined in 1963	6.2288	10.0224	5 2/3	11	0.0001
277.463	4.54680939	Imperial gallon as defined by Order in Council of 28 November 1889	6.2279	10.024	5 2/3	11	0.015
278	4.555603792	Exchequer (Henry VII, with copper rim)	6 30/139	10.0434	4.5	17.5	0.12
278.4	4.562158618	Exchequer (1601 and 1602 pints)	6 6/29	10.0578	7	7.25	0.22
280	4.58837792	Exchequer (1601 quart)	6 6/35	10.1156	5	14.25	0.07
282	4.621152048	Treasury (beer and ale gallon pre-1824)	6 6/47	10.1879	6.5	8.5	0.02
