= Skein =

Skein /skeɪn/ may refer to:

- A traditional English collective noun for a flock of wildfowl such as ducks, geese, or swans in flight
- A wound ball of yarn with a center-pull strand: see hank
- A metal sleeve fitted over the end of a wagon axle, to which the wheel is mounted
- Skein dubh or sgian-dubh, a Scottish knife
- Skein (unit), a unit of length used by weavers and tailors

== Fiction ==
- Skein (character), a Marvel Comics supervillain

== Mathematics ==
- Skein (graph theory), a subgraph of a graph formed by paths connecting a given pair of vertices
- Skein (hash function), a cryptographic hash function submitted to the NIST competition
- Skein module, a mathematical structure used in knot theory
- Skein relation, a key identity used to define knot polynomials

== See also ==
- Skien (disambiguation)
