= English units of measurement =

System of units formerly used in England

English units of measurement evolved from Anglo-Saxon and ancient Roman units of measurement, and were used in England up to 1826, when many were redefined or superseded by Imperial units. Various standards have applied to English units at different times, in different places, and for different applications.

Use of the term "English units" can be ambiguous, as, in addition to the meaning used in this article, it is sometimes used to refer to the units of the descendant Imperial system as well to those of the descendant system of United States customary units.

The two main sets of English units were the Winchester Units, used from 1495 to 1587, as affirmed by King Henry VII, and the Exchequer Standards, in use from 1588 to 1825, as defined by Queen Elizabeth I.

In England (and the British Empire), the systems of English units were replaced by the Imperial system in 1826, under a Weights and Measures Act passed in 1824 which retained many though not all of the unit names and redefined (standardised) many of the definitions. In the US, being independent from the British Empire decades before the 1824 reforms, English units were standardized and adopted (as "US Customary Units") in 1832.

== History ==
Very little is known of the units of measurement used in the British Isles prior to Roman colonisation in the 1st century AD. During the Roman period, Roman Britain relied on Ancient Roman units of measurement. During the Anglo-Saxon period, the North German foot of 13.2 inches (340 millimetres) was the nominal basis for other units of linear measurement. The foot was divided into 4 palms or 12 thumbs. A cubit was 2 feet, an elne 4 feet. The rod was 15 Anglo-Saxon feet, the furlong 10 rods. An acre was 4 rods × 40 rods, i.e. 160 square rods or 36,000 square Anglo-Saxon feet. However, Roman units continued to be used in the construction crafts, and reckoning by the Roman mile of 5,000 feet (or 8 stades) continued, in contrast to other Germanic countries which adopted the name "mile" for a longer native length closer to the league (which was 3 Roman miles). From the time of Offa King of Mercia (8th century) until 1526 the Saxon pound, also known as the moneyers' pound (and later known as the Tower pound) was the fundamental unit of weight (by Offa's law, one pound of silver, by weight, was subdivided into 240 silver pennies, hence (in money) 240 pence – twenty shillings – was known as one pound).

Prior to the enactment of a law known as the "Composition of Yards and Perches" (Latin: Compositio ulnarum et perticarum) some time between 1266 and 1303, the English system of measurement had been based on that of the Anglo-Saxons, who were descended from tribes of northern Germany. The Compositio redefined the yard, foot, inch, and barleycorn to 10/11 of their previous value. However, it retained the Anglo-Saxon rod of 15 × 11/10 feet (5.03 metres) and the acre of 4 × 40 square rods. Thus, the rod went from 5 old yards to 5 1/2 new yards, or 15 old feet to 16 1/2 new feet. The furlong went from 600 old feet (200 old yards) to 660 new feet (220 new yards). The acre went from 36,000 old square feet to 43,560 new square feet. Scholars have speculated that the Compositio may have represented a compromise between the two earlier systems of units, the Anglo-Saxon and the Roman.

The Norman conquest of England introduced just one new unit: the bushel. William the Conqueror, in one of his first legislative acts, confirmed existing Anglo-Saxon measurement, a position which was consistent with Norman policy in dealing with occupied peoples. The Magna Carta of 1215 stipulates that there should be a standard measure of volume for wine, ale and corn (the London Quarter), and for weight, but does not define these units.

Later development of the English system was by defining the units in laws and by issuing measurement standards. Standards were renewed in 1496, 1588, and 1758. The last Imperial Standard Yard in bronze was made in 1845; it served as the standard in the United Kingdom until the yard was redefined by the international yard and pound agreement (as 0.9144 metres) in 1959 (statutory implementation was in the Weights and Measures Act 1963). Over time, the English system had spread to other parts of the British Empire.

=== Timeline ===
Selected excerpts from the bibliography of Marks and Marking of Weights and Measures of the British Isles

- 1215 Magna Carta — the earliest statutory declaration for uniformity of weights and measures
- 1335 8 & 9 Edw. 3. c. 1 — First statutory reference describing goods as avoirdupois
- 1414 2 Hen. 5. Stat. 2. c. 4 — First statutory mention of the Troy pound
- 1495 12 Hen. 7. c. 5 — New Exchequer standards were constructed, including Winchester capacity measures defined by Troy weight of their content of threshed wheat by stricken (i.e. level) measure (first statutory mention of Troy weight as standard weight for bullion, bread, spices etc.).
- 1527 Hen VIII — Abolished the Tower pound
- 1531 23 Hen. 8. c. 4 — Barrel to contain 36 gallons of beer or 32 of ale; kilderkin is half of this; firkin is half again.
- 1532 24 Hen. 8. c. 3 — First statutory references to use of avoirdupois weight.
- 1536 28 Hen. 8. c. 4 — Added the tierce (41 gallons)
- 1588 (Elizabeth I) — A new series of Avoirdupois standard bronze weights (bell-shaped from 56 lb to 2 lb and flat-pile from 8 lb to a dram), with new Troy standard weights in nested cups, from 256 oz to 1/8 oz in a binary progression.
- 1601–1602 — Standard bushels and gallons were constructed based on the standards of Henry VII and a new series of capacity measures were issued.
- 1660 12 Cha. 2. c. 24 — Barrel of beer to be 36 gallons, taken by the gauge of the Exchequer standard of the ale quart; barrel of ale to be 32 gallons; all other liquors retailed to be sold by the wine gallon
- 1689 1 Will. & Mar. c. 24 — Barrels of beer and ale outside London to contain 34 gallons
- 1695 7 Will. 3. c. 24 (I) — Irish Act about grain measures decreed: unit of measure to be Henry VIII's gallon as confirmed by Elizabeth I; i.e. 272 1/4 cubic inches; standard measures of the barrel (32 gallons), half-barrel (16 gallons), bushel (8), peck (2), and gallon lodged in the Irish Exchequer; and copies were provided in every county, city, town, etc.
- 1696 8 & 9 Will. 3. c. 22 — Size of Winchester bushel "every round bushel with a plain and even bottom being 18 1/2″ wide throughout and 8″ deep" (i.e. a dry measure of 2150 in^{3} per gallon).
- 1706 6 Ann. c. 11 — Act of Union decreed the weights and measures of England to be applied in Scotland, whose burgs (towns) were to take charge of the duplicates of the English Standards sent to them.
- 1706 6 Ann. c. 27 — Wine gallon to be a cylindrical vessel with an even bottom 7″ diameter throughout and 6″ deep from top to bottom of the inside, or holding 231 in^{3} and no more.
- 1713 12 Ann. c. 17 — The legal coal bushel to be round with a plain and even bottom, 19 1/2 inches from outside to outside and to hold 1 Winchester bushel and 1 quart of water.
- 1718 5 Geo. 1. c. 18 — Decreed Scots Pint to be exactly 103 in^{3}.
- 1803 43 Geo. 3. c. 151 — Referred to wine bottles making about 5 to the wine gallon (i.e. Reputed Quarts)
- 1824 5 Geo. 4. c. 74 — Weights and Measures Act 1824 completely reorganized British metrology and established Imperial weights and measures; defined the yard, troy and avoirdupois pounds and the gallon (as the standard measure for liquids and dry goods not measured by heaped measure), and provided for a 'brass' standard gallon to be constructed.
- 1825 6 Geo. 4. c. 12 — Delayed introduction of Imperial weights and measures from 1 May 1825 to 1 January 1826.
- 1835 5 & 6 Will. 4. c. 63 — Weights and Measures Act 1835 abolished local and customary measures, including the Winchester bushel; made heaped measure illegal; required trade to be carried out by avoirdupois weight only, except for bullion, gems and drugs (which were to be sold by troy weight instead); decreed that all forms of coal were to be sold by weight and not measure; legalised the 'stone' as 14 lb (6.4 kg), the 'hundredweight' as 112 lb (51 kg), and the (long) ton as 20 hundredweight, or 2,240 lb (1,020 kg).
- 1853 16 & 17 Vict. c. 29 — Permitted the use of decimal bullion weights.
- 1866 29 & 30 Vict. c. 82 — Standards of Weights, Measures, and Coinage Act 1866 transferred all duties and standards from the Exchequer to the newly created Standards Department of the Board of Trade.
- 1878 41 & 42 Vict. c. 49 — Weights and Measures Act 1878 defined the Imperial standard yard and pound; enumerated the secondary standards of measure and weight derived from the Imperial standards; required all trade by weight or measure to be in terms of one of the Imperial weights or measures or some multiple part thereof; abolished the Troy pound.
- 1963 c. 31 — Weights and Measures Act 1963 abolished the chaldron of coal, the fluid drachm and minim (effective 1 February 1971), discontinued the use of the quarter, abolished the use of the bushel and peck, and abolished the pennyweight (from 31 January 1969).

== Length ==
Chart showing the (sometimes approximate) relationships between assorted historical distance measures

Table of equivalences
English unit	SI (metric)	Traditional definition	Origin of term
Poppyseed	2.12 or 1.69 mm	= 1/4 or 1/5 of a barleycorn	Agricultural usage
Line	2.12 mm	= 1/4 of a barleycorn, (thus 1/12 of an inch).	Agricultural usage
Barleycorn	8.47 mm	= 1/3 of an inch, the notional base unit under the Composition of Yards and Perches.	Agricultural usage
Digit	19.05 mm	= 3/4 inch	Anthropic
Finger	22.23 mm	= 7/8 inch	Anthropic
Inch	25.4 mm	3 barleycorns (the historical legal definition)	Likely anthropic
Nail (cloth)	57.15 mm	3 digits = 2 1/4 inches = 1/16 yard	Textile usage
Palm	76.2 mm	3 inches	Anthropic
Hand	101.6 mm	4 inches	Anthropic
Shaftment	165 mm or 152 mm	Width of the hand and outstretched thumb, 6 1/2 inches before 12th century, 6 thereafter	Anthropic
Link	201.2 mm	7.92 inches or one 100th of a chain. (A modern Indian surveyor's chain has 200 mm links.)	Surveying
Span	228.6 mm	Width of the outstretched hand, from the tip of the thumb to the tip of the little finger: 9 inches (= 3 palms).	Anthropic
Foot	304.8 mm	Prior to the Anglo-Saxon invasions, the Roman foot of 11.65 inches (296 mm) was used. The Anglo-Saxons introduced a North-German foot of 13.2 inches (335 mm), divided into 4 palms or 12 thumbs, while the Roman foot continued to be used in the construction crafts. In the late 13th century, the modern foot of 304.8 mm was introduced, equal to exactly 10/11 Anglo-Saxon foot.	Anthropic
Cubit	457.2 mm	From fingertips to elbow, 18 inches.	Anthropic
Yard	0.914 m	3 feet = 36 inches, the practical base unit, defined as the length of the prototype bar held by the Crown or Exchequer.	Surveying
Ell	1.143 m	From fingertip of outstretched arm to opposite shoulder, 20 nails = 1 1/4 yard or 45 inches. Mostly for measuring cloth.	Textile usage
Fathom	1.829 m	6 feet, distance between arms outstretched, from fingertip to fingertip, on a 6-foot-tall person.	Nautical
Rod	5.0292 m	Also called a perch or pole: a measure used for surveying land and in architecture. The length of the rod (then called perch) was declared to be 16 1/2 feet or 5 1/2 yards in the Composition of Yards and Perches. The square pole is commonly used as a measurement for Allotment gardens. (See also perch as an area and a volume unit.) It may have originated from the typical length of a medieval ox-goad.	Likely agricultural, could be from surveying
Chain	20.116 m	Four linear rods. Named after the length of surveyor's chain used to measure distances until quite recently. Any of several actual chains used for land surveying and divided in links. Gunter's chain, introduced in the 17th century, is 66 feet (20.1 metres).	Surveying
Skein	109.73 m	A textile measurement, defined typically as 96 ells, or a sixth of a hank.	Textile usage
Furlong	201.168 m	Notionally the distance a plough team could furrow without rest, but actually a measure of 40 rods or 600 feet prior to the Composition of Yards and Perches; 40 rods or 660 feet since then. (See also the Ancient Greek stadion or 'stade'.)	Agricultural usage
Hank	658.38 m	A textile measurement, composed of 6 skeins.	Textile usage
Mile	1.61 km	5280 feet or 1760 yards. Originally the Roman mile, 1000 paces, later reckoned as 5000 feet, but adjusted to 5280 feet in 1593 to account for the differences introduced to these methods of reckoning by the Composition of Yards and Perches.	Likely for surveying
League	4.83 km	Notionally an hour's march, but usually reckoned as three miles. Approximate length of the traditional "mile" in German and Scandinavian countries.	Either nautical or for surveying
Spindle	13.16 km	A textile measurement for cotton and linen, composed of 20 hanks.	Textile usage

== Area ==
Table of equivalences
English unit	SI ("metric")	Relationship
Square rod	25.29 m^{2}	30.25 square yards. A square rod is also known as a square pole or a square perch. Sometimes the word 'square' is omitted when the context clearly indicates that the subject is area, notably so in the case of British allotment gardens.
Rood	1,012 m^{2}	One quarter of an acre; one 'furlong' in length by one 'rod' in width; 40 square 'rods'. The rood was sometimes called an acre itself in many ancient contexts.
Acre	4,047 m^{2}	An area of land one chain (four rods) wide by one furlong in length. As the traditional furlong could vary in length from country to country, so did the acre. In England an acre was 4,840 square yards (4,050 m^{2}), in Scotland 6,150 square yards (5,140 m^{2}) and in Ireland 7,840 square yards (6,560 m^{2}). It is a Saxon unit, meaning "field".
Bovate, Oxgang	6 ha	The area that one ox can plough in a single year. Approximately 15 acres or one eighth of a carucate.
Virgate	12 ha	The area that a pair of oxen can plough in a single year. Approximately 30 acres (also called yard land).
Carucate	49 ha	The area that can be ploughed by one eight-oxen team in a single year (also called a plough or carve). Approximately 120 acres.

=== Administrative units ===
Hide
four to eight bovates. A unit of yield, rather than area, it measured the amount of land able to support a single household for agricultural and taxation purposes.
Knight's fee
five hides. A knight's fee was expected to produce one fully equipped soldier for a knight's retinue in times of war.
Hundred or wapentake
100 hides grouped for administrative purposes.

== Volume ==
Many measures of capacity were understood as fractions or multiples of a gallon. For example, a quart is a quarter of a gallon, and a pint is half of a quart, or an eighth of a gallon. These ratios applied regardless of the specific size of the gallon. Not only did the definition of the gallon change over time, but there were several different kinds of gallon, which existed at the same time. For example, a wine gallon with a volume of 231 cubic inches (the basis of the U.S. gallon) and an ale gallon of 282 cubic inches, were commonly used for many decades prior to the establishment of the imperial gallon. In other words, a pint of ale and a pint of wine were not the same size. On the other hand, some measures – such as the fluid ounce – were not defined as a fraction of a gallon. For that reason, it is not always possible to give accurate definitions of units such as pints or quarts, in terms of ounces, prior to the establishment of the imperial gallon.

=== General liquid measures ===
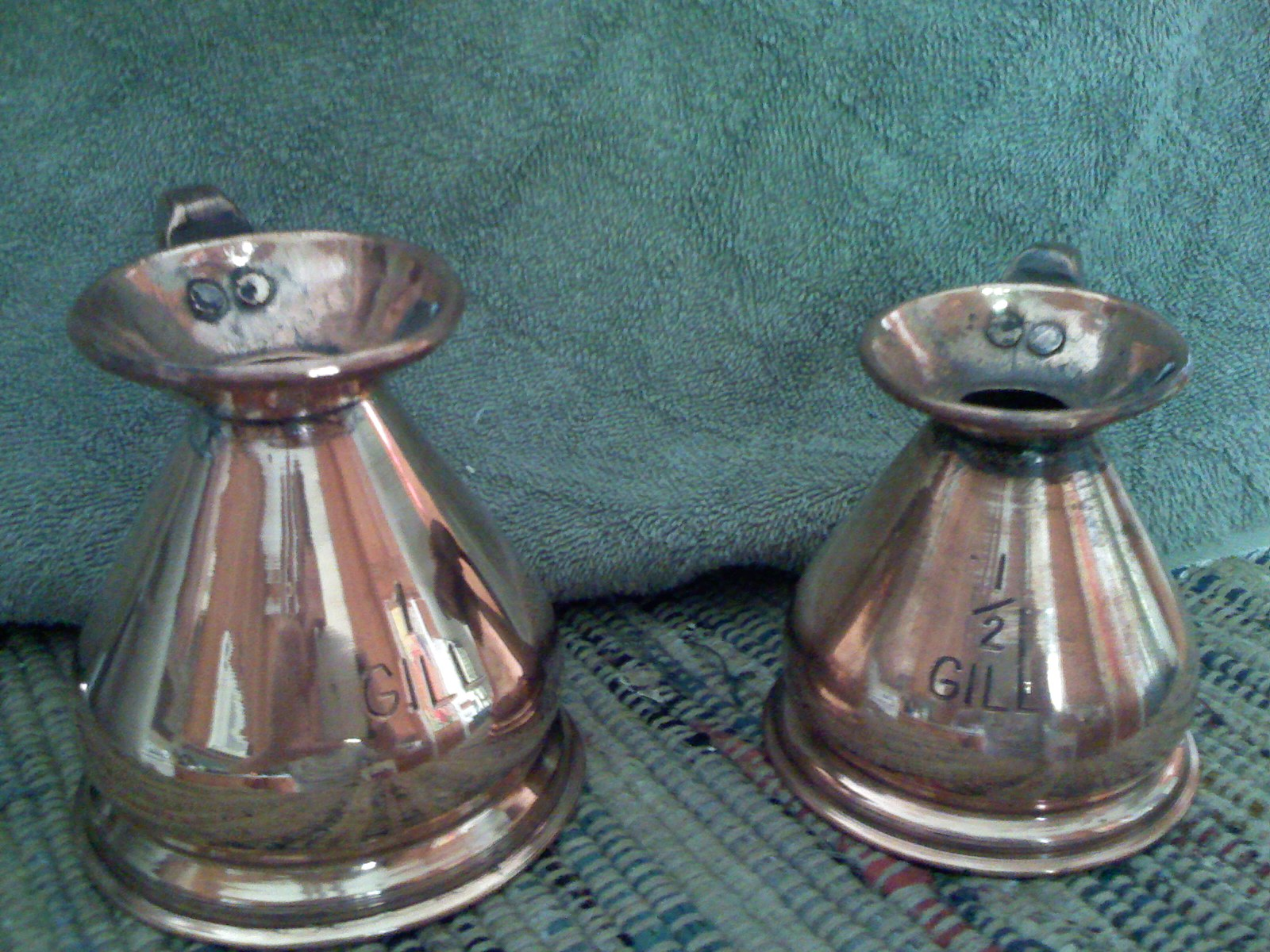
Measuring cups of 1 gill and 1/2 gill (a jack).

Table of equivalences
Name	Approx SI equiv.	Notes
Minim	0.06 mL	Also known as a drop. (Note: The volume of a drop was not then and is not now well defined: it depends on the device and technique used to produce the drop, on the strength of the gravitational field, and on the viscosity, density, and the surface tension of the liquid.)
Dram	3.55 mL	60 minims or 'drops' or 1/8 fluid ounce (fl oz). See also drachm.
Teaspoon	5 mL	80 minim or drops or 1/6 fl oz
Tablespoon	15 mL	4 dram (240 minim or drops), 3 teaspoons, or 1/2 fl oz
Jack	71 mL	1/2 Gill. This is not a traditional measure.
Gill	142 mL	1/4 pint, or 1/32 gallon, in some dialects 1/2 pint. Pronounced as "Jill"
Pint	568 mL	1/8 gallon
Quart	1.136 litre	2 pints or 1/4 gallon
Pottle	2.272 L	2 quarts or 1/2 gallon
Gallon	4.544 L	8 pints

Liquid measures as binary submultiples of their respective gallons (ale or wine):

	jack	gill	pint	quart	pottle	gallon	2^{n} gal.
1 jack =	1	1/2	1/8	1/16	1/32	1/64	–6
1 gill =	2	1	1/4	1/8	1/16	1/32	–5
1 pint =	8	4	1	1/2	1/4	1/8	–3
1 quart =	16	8	2	1	1/2	1/4	–2
1 pottle =	32	16	4	2	1	1/2	–1
1 gallon =	64	32	8	4	2	1	0

=== Wine ===
Wine is traditionally measured based on the wine gallon and its related units. Other liquids such as brandy, spirits, mead, cider, vinegar, oil, honey, and so on, were also measured and sold in these units.

The wine gallon was re-established by Queen Anne in 1707 after a 1688 survey found the Exchequer no longer possessed the necessary standard but had instead been depending on a copy held by the Guildhall. Defined as 231 cubic inches, it differs from the later imperial gallon, but is equal to the United States customary gallon.

Rundlet
18 wine gallons or 1/7 wine pipe
Wine barrel
31.5 wine gallons or 1/2 wine hogshead
Tierce
42 wine gallons, 1/2 puncheon or 1/3 wine pipe
Wine hogshead
2 wine barrels, 63 wine gallons or 1/4 wine tun
Puncheon or tertian
2 tierce, 84 wine gallons or 1/3 wine tun
Wine pipe or butt
2 wine hogshead, 3 tierce, 7 roundlet or 126 wine gallons
Wine tun
2 wine pipe, 3 puncheon or 252 wine gallons

English wine cask units
gallon	rundlet	barrel	tierce	hogshead	puncheon, tertian	pipe, butt	tun	
							1	tun
						1	2	pipes, butts
					1	1 1/2	3	puncheons, tertians
				1	1 1/3	2	4	hogsheads
			1	1 1/2	2	3	6	tierces
		1	1 1/3	2	2 2/3	4	8	barrels
	1	1 3/4	2 1/3	3 1/2	4 2/3	7	14	rundlets
1	18	31 1/2	42	63	84	126	252	gallons (wine)
3.785	68.14	119.24	158.99	238.48	317.97	476.96	953.92	litres
1	15	26 1/4	35	52 1/2	70	105	210	gallons (imperial)
4.546	68.19	119.3	159.1	238.7	318.2	477.3	954.7	litres

=== Ale and beer ===
Pin
4.5 gallons or 1/8 beer barrel
Firkin
2 pins, 9 gallons (ale, beer or goods) or 1/4 beer barrel
Kilderkin
2 firkins, 18 gallons or 1/2 beer barrel
Beer barrel
2 kilderkins, 36 gallons or 2/3 beer hogshead
Beer hogshead
3 kilderkins, 54 gallons or 1.5 beer barrels
Beer pipe or butt
2 beer hogsheads, 3 beer barrels or 108 gallons
Beer tun
2 beer pipes or 216 gallons

English brewery cask units
gallon	firkin	kilderkin	barrel	hogshead		Year designated
				1	hogsheads	
			1	1 1/2	barrels	
		1	2	3	kilderkins	
	1	2	4	6	firkins	
1	8	16	32	48	ale gallons	(1454)
= 4.621 L	= 36.97 L	= 73.94 L	= 147.9 L	= 221.8 L	ale gallons	(1454)
1	9	18	36	54	beer gallons	(1454)
= 4.621 L	= 41.59 L	= 83.18 L	= 166.4 L	= 249.5 L	beer gallons	(1454)
1	8 1/2	17	34	51	ale gallons	1688
= 4.621 L	= 39.28 L	= 78.56 L	= 157.1 L	= 235.7 L	ale gallons	1688
1	9	18	36	54	ale gallons	1803
= 4.621 L	= 41.59 L	= 83.18 L	= 166.4 L	= 249.5 L	ale gallons	1803
1	9	18	36	54	imperial gallons	1824
= 4.546 L	= 40.91 L	= 81.83 L	= 163.7 L	= 245.5 L	imperial gallons	1824

=== Grain and dry goods ===
The Winchester measure, also known as the corn measure, centered on the bushel of approximately 2,150.42 cubic inches, which had been in use with only minor modifications since at least the late 15th century. The word corn at that time referred to all types of grain. The corn measure was used to measure and sell many types of dry goods, such as grain, salt, ore, and oysters.

However, in practice, such goods were often sold by weight. For example, it might be agreed by local custom that a bushel of wheat should weigh 60 pounds, or a bushel of oats should weigh 33 pounds. The goods would be measured out by volume, and then weighed, and the buyer would pay more or less depending on the actual weight. This practice of specifying bushels in weight for each commodity continues today. This was not always the case though, and even the same market that sold wheat and oats by weight might sell barley simply by volume. In fact, the entire system was not well standardized. A sixteenth of a bushel might be called a pottle, hoop, beatment, or quartern, in towns only a short distance apart. In some places potatoes might be sold by the firkin—usually a liquid measure—with one town defining a firkin as 3 bushels, and the next town as 2 1/2 bushels.

The pint was the smallest unit in the corn measure. The corn gallon, one eighth of a bushel, was approximately 268.8 cubic inches. Most of the units associated with the corn measure were binary (sub)multiples of the bushel:

	pint	quart	pottle	gallon	peck	kenning	bushel	strike	coomb	seam	2^{n} gal.
1 pint =	1	1/2	1/4	1/8	1/16	1/32	1/64	1/128	1/256	1/512	–3
1 quart =	2	1	1/2	1/4	1/8	1/16	1/32	1/64	1/128	1/256	–2
1 pottle =	4	2	1	1/2	1/4	1/8	1/16	1/32	1/64	1/128	–1
1 gallon =	8	4	2	1	1/2	1/4	1/8	1/16	1/32	1/64	0
1 peck =	16	8	4	2	1	1/2	1/4	1/8	1/16	1/32	1
1 kenning =	32	16	8	4	2	1	1/2	1/4	1/8	1/16	2
1 bushel =	64	32	16	8	4	2	1	1/2	1/4	1/8	3
1 strike =	128	64	32	16	8	4	2	1	1/2	1/4	4
1 coomb =	256	128	64	32	16	8	4	2	1	1/2	5
1 seam =	512	256	128	64	32	16	8	4	2	1	6

Other units included the wey (6 or sometimes 5 seams or quarters), and the last (10 seams or quarters).

=== Specific goods ===
Perch
24.75 cubic feet of dry stone, derived from the more commonly known perch, a unit of length equal to 16.5 feet.
Cord
128 cubic feet of firewood, a stack of firewood 4 ft × 4 ft × 8 ft

=== Chemistry ===
Fluid-grain
The volume of 1 grain of distilled water at 62 °F, 30 inHg pressure.

At that reference, water has a density of ≃ 0.9988 g/ml (438.0 grain/(imp fl oz) or 1.001 oz_{av}/(imp fl oz)), and thus:

= 1.096 imperial minim = .06488 ml or approximately a drop.

== Weight ==
Chart showing the relationships of weight measures

The Avoirdupois, Troy and Apothecary systems of weights all shared the same finest unit, the grain; however, they differ as to the number of grains there are in a dram, ounce and pound. This grain was legally defined as the weight of a grain seed from the middle of an ear of barley. There also was a smaller wheat grain, said to be 3/4 (barley) grains or about 48.6 milligrams.

The avoirdupois pound was eventually standardised as 7,000 grains and was used for all products not subject to Apothecaries's or Tower weight.

=== Avoirdupois ===
Equivalents
English unit	SI ('Metric')	Relationship
Grain (gr)	≈64.80 mg	1/7000 of a pound
Dram/drachm (dr)	≈1.772 g	sixteenth of an ounce (possibly originated as the weight of silver in Ancient Greek coin drachma)
Ounce (oz)	≈28.35 g	1 oz = 16 dr = 437.5 grains
Pound (lb)	≈453.6 g	1 lb = 16 oz = 7000 grains ('lb' is an abbreviation for the Ancient Roman unit libra)
Stone (st)	6.35 kg	1 st = 14 lb (see Stone (unit) for other values)
Quarter (qr)	12.7 kg	1 qr = 1/4 cwt, or 2 st, or 28 lb
Hundredweight (cwt)	50.8 kg	1 cwt = 112 lb, or 8 st
Ton	1.016 tonne	1 ton = 20 cwt, or 2240 lb
Nail	3.175 kg	1 nail = 1/16 cwt = 7 lb
Clove	3.18 kg (wool); 3.63 kg (cheese)	7 lb (wool); 8 lb (cheese)
Tod	12.7 kg	1 tod = 2 st = 1/4 cwt

=== Troy and Tower ===
The Troy and Tower pounds and their subdivisions were used for coins and precious metals. The Tower pound, which was based upon an earlier Anglo-Saxon pound, was replaced by the Troy pound when a proclamation dated 1526 required the Troy pound to be used for mint purposes instead of the Tower pound. No standards of the Tower pound are known to have survived.

Established in the 8th century by Offa of Mercia, a pound sterling (or "pound of sterlings") was that weight of sterling silver sufficient to make 240 silver pennies.

==== Troy ====
Grain (gr)
= 64.79891 mg
Pennyweight (dwt)
24 gr ≈ 1.56 g
Ounce (oz t)
20 dwt = 480 gr ≈ 31.1 g
Pound (lb t)
12 oz t = 5760 gr ≈ 373 g
Mark
8 oz t

==== Tower ====
Grain (gr)
= 45/64 gr t ≈ 45.6 mg
Pennyweight (dwt)
32 gr T = 22 1/2 gr t ≈ 1.46 g
Tower ounce
20 dwt T = 640 gr T = 18 3/4 dwt t = 450 gr t ≈ 29.2 g
Tower pound
12 oz T = 240 dwt T = 7680 gr T = 225 dwt t = 5400 gr t ≈ 350 g
Mark
8 oz T ≈ 233 g

=== Apothecary ===
Grain (gr)
= 64.79891 mg
Scruple (s ap)
20 gr
Dram (dr ap)
3 s ap = 60 gr
Ounce (oz ap)
8 dr ap = 480 gr
Pound (lb ap)
5760 gr = 1 lb t

=== Others ===
Merchants/Mercantile pound
15 oz tower = 6750 gr ≈ 437.4 g
London/Mercantile pound
15 oz troy = 16 oz tower = 7200 gr ≈ 466.6 g
Mercantile stone
12 lb L ≈ 5.6 kg
Butcher's stone
8 lb ≈ 3.63 kg
Sack
26 st = 364 lb ≈ 165 kg
The carat was once specified as four grains in the English-speaking world.
Some local units in the English dominion were (re-)defined in simple terms of English units, such as the Indian tola of 180 grains.
Tod
This was an English weight for wool. It has the alternative spelling forms of tode, todd, todde, toad, and tood. It was usually 28 pounds, or two stone. The tod, however, was not a national standard and could vary by English shire, ranging from 28 to 32 pounds. In addition to the traditional definition in terms of pounds, the tod has historically also been considered to be 1/13 of a sack, 1/26 of a sarpler, or 1/9 of a wey.

English pounds
Unit	Pounds											Ounces						Grains		Metric	
Unit	Avdp.		Troy		Tower		Merchant		London		Metric	Avdp.		Troy		Tower		Troy	Tower	g	kg
Avoirdupois	1		175/144	= 1.21527̅	35/27	= 1.2̅9̅6̅	28/27	= 1.0̅3̅7̅	35/36	= 0.972̅	≈ 0.9072	16		14 7/12	= 14.583̅	15 5/9	= 15.5̅	7,000	9,955 5/9	≈ 454	≈ 5/11
Troy	144/175	≈ 0.8229	1		16/15	= 1.06̅	64/75	= 0.853̅	4/5	= 0.8	≈ 0.7465	13 29/175	≈ 13.17	12		12 4/5	= 12.8	5,760	8,192	≈ 373	≈ 3/8
Tower	27/35	≈ 0.7714	15/16	= 0.9375	1		4/5	= 0.8	3/4	= 0.75	≈ 0.6998	12 12/35	≈ 12.34	11 1/4	= 11.25	12		5,400	7,680	≈ 350	≈ 7/20
Merchant	27/28	≈ 0.9643	75/64	= 1.171875	5/4	= 1.25	1		15/16	= 0.9375	≈ 0.8748	15 3/7	≈ 15.43	14 1/16	= 14.0625	15		6,750	9,600	≈ 437	≈ 7/16
London	36/35	≈ 1.029	5/4	= 1.25	4/3	= 1.3̅	16/15	= 1.06̅	1		≈ 0.9331	16 16/35	≈ 16.46	15		16		7,200	10,240	≈ 467	≈ 7/15
Metric		≈ 1.1023		≈ 1.3396		≈ 1.4289		≈ 1.1431		≈ 1.0717	1		≈ 17.64		≈ 16.08		≈ 17.15	7,716	10,974	= 500	= 1/2

== See also ==
- Approximate conversion of units
- Ancient Roman Units of Measurement – System of measurement used in Ancient Rome
- Comparison of the imperial and US customary measurement systems
- Domesday Book – 11th-century survey of landholding in England
- English Engineering Units – System of measurement used in the United States
- Feudalism – Legal and military structure in medieval Europe
- History of measurement
- Hundred – 120 (as in six score, rather than 100), a unit of 100 or 120 items
- Imperial and US customary measurement systems – English (pre 1824), Imperial (post 1824) and US Customary (post 1776) units of measure
- Imperial units – System of measurements
- Long hundred – 120 (as in six score, rather than 100)
- Metrication – Conversion to the metric system of measurement
- Obsolete Scottish units of measurement – Obsolete units of measurement formerly used in Scotland
- Plan for Establishing Uniformity in the Coinage, Weights, and Measures of the United States – 1790 report to the US Congress
- Slug – Unit of mass
  - poundal – Unit of force
- Spanish customary units – Spanish and Portuguese units of measurement
- Weights and measures – Quantity standard
- Welsh units – Historical units of measurement used in Wales
- Winchester measure – Set of legal standards of volume
