= Plan for Establishing Uniformity in the Coinage, Weights, and Measures of the United States =

1790 report to the US Congress

The "Plan for Establishing Uniformity in the Coinage, Weights, and Measures of the United States" was a report submitted to the U.S. House of Representatives on July 13, 1790, by Secretary of State Thomas Jefferson.

At the First United States Congress, which met in 1789 when the decimal metric system had not yet been developed in France, the system of units to be used in the U.S. was one point of discussion. Under the Constitution (article I, section 8), the Congress has the constitutional right to decide on a standard of weights and measures. On January 8, 1790, George Washington urged Congress to address the need for the uniform system of weights and measures, and on January 15, 1790, the House of Representatives requested Thomas Jefferson to draw up a plan.

The decimal dollar had already been agreed upon in principle in 1785, but would not be implemented until after the enactment of the Coinage Act of 1792. After correspondence with William Waring and others, Jefferson proposed two systems of units in mid-1790. The first was evolutionary, and was based on refinement of the definitions of the units of the existing English system, as well as simplification of their relationship to each other. The second system was revolutionary, and was based on units linked by powers of ten, very similar to the decimal metric system which would be proposed in France. The base units for length, mass, and volume in Jefferson's revolutionary system (named the foot, the ounce, and the bushel, respectively) were relatively close in size to their pre-existing counterparts and bore identical names, although the manner in which they were defined was very different.

Jefferson's proposal was the world's first scientifically based, fully integrated, decimal system of weights and measures.

== The seconds pendulum basis ==
In coordination with scientists in France, Jefferson selected the seconds pendulum at 45° latitude as the basic reference. For technical reasons, he proposed using a uniform rod as the pendulum rather than a traditional pendulum. The pendulum was estimated to be 39.14912 English inches long (which at that time had not been defined to exactly 25.4 mm), or 1.5 times that for a vibrating rod (58.72368 inches).

Redefinition of the inch by the 45°N seconds pendulum or rod
base	pendulum	vibrating rod	foot
original	39.14912 in	58.72368 in	304.801 mm
ideal pendulum	36 in = 3 ft = 1 yd	54 in	331.463 mm
ideal rod	40 in	60 in = 5 ft	298.317 mm
practical rod	39.16̅ in	58.75 in	304.664 mm
modern	39.13198 in	58.69796 in	304.8 mm

== More traditional proposal ==
In the evolutionary approach, the foot was to be derived from these lengths by a simple integer factor, which would be either three (pendulum) or five (rod), i.e. lengthening it from the traditional value of about 304 mm by slightly over 1 inch to ca. 331 mm or shortening it by about a quarter of an inch to ca. 298 mm. For practical purposes he wanted the rod to be 58 3/4 (new) inches long, an increase of less than 0.045%.

For the mass units, the ounce as a base would equal the weight of one thousandth of a cubic foot of rain water at standard temperature.

Jeffersonian conservative proposal
Length
line		587 1/5 in standard rod
inch		= 10 lines
foot		= 12 inches
yard		= 3 feet
ell		= 3 3/4 feet
fathom		= 6 feet
perch, pole		= 5 1/2 yards
furlong		= 40 poles
mile		= 8 furlongs
league		= 3 miles
Area
rood		= 40 square poles
acre		= 4 roods
Volume
dry	liquid	
gill		= 1/4 pint
pint		= 1/2 quart
quart		= 1/2 pottle
pottle		= 1/2 gallon
gallon		= 270 cubic inches
peck		= 2 gallons
bushel	firkin	= 4 pecks
strike	kilderkin	= 2 bushels or firkins
coomb	barrel	= 2 strikes or kilderkins
quarter	hogshead	= 2 coombs or barrels
	tierce	= 4/3 hogshead
	pipe, butt, puncheon	= 2 hogshead
ton		= 2 pipes = 3 tierces = 4 quarters
Mass
grain		= 1/24 pennyweight
pennyweight		= 1/18 ounce
ounce		= 1/1000 m_{H_{2}O}(1 cubic foot)
pound		= 16 ounces

Although the rundlet is mentioned as an existing measure for liquids equivalent to a kilderkin, it was omitted from the list of redefinitions.

== Decimal system based on the foot ==
Jefferson's proposed decimal system preceded the adoption in France of the decimal metric system, although both developed simultaneously. In France, the metre was to be defined as the ten-millionth part of an arc between the North Pole and the equator. Jefferson's system was based on the length of a rod oscillating seconds at 45 degrees latitude, with the foot defined as one fifth of the length of such a rod. Similar to the French system, Jefferson proposed a system of units linked directly by powers of ten. However, Jefferson's system did not make use of the concept of prefixes, which were of great importance in the French system. Instead, the names of old units were carried over into the new system for decimal multiples of the base units, giving them new values.

Asserting the value of such thorough reform to the existing system of weights and measures, the report stated:

But if it be thought that, either now, or at any future time, the citizens of the United States may be induced to undertake a thorough reformation of their whole system of measures, weights and coins, reducing every branch to the same decimal ratio already established in their coins, and thus bringing the calculation of the principal affairs of life within the arithmetic of every man who can multiply and divide plain numbers, greater changes will be necessary.

The following table lists the units of the Jeffersonian decimal system, and their relationship with one another. The values of these units are based on Jefferson's proposal of a foot that was equal in length to one-fifth of a second rod, one fourth of an inch shorter than the foot in use at the time, and approximately equal to 0.298461684 m. For the mass units, the ounce as a base would equal the weight of a cubic inch of pure water at standard temperature.

Jeffersonian decimal proposal
	Value relative to base unit	SI equivalent	USCS equivalent
Length
Point	0.001	0.29846 mm	11.75 mil (0.846 p)
Line	0.01	2.9846 mm	0.1175 in (0.705 P)
Inch	0.1	2.9846 cm	1.175 in
Foot	1	2.9846 dm	11.75 in
Decad	10	2.9846 m	9.792 ft
Rood	100	2.9846 dam	97.92 ft (32.64 yd)
Furlong	1000	2.9846 hm	979.2 ft (1.484 fur)
Mile	10000	2.9846 km	1.85 mi
Area
Rood	1 = 1 rood^{2}	8.9078 a	9588.424 ft^{2}
Double Acre	10	0.89078 ha	2.2 acre
Volume
Metre	0.001 = 1 in^{3}	2.6587 cL	1.798 Tbsp
Demi-pint	0.01	2.6587 dL	8.99 fl oz
Pottle	0.1	2.6587 L	2.809 qt
Bushel	1 = 1 ft^{3}	2.6587 daL	7.023 gal
Quarter	10	2.6587 hL	70.23 gal (2.23 bbl)
Last, Double Ton	100	2.6587 m^{3}	702.3 gal (93.89 ft^{3})
Mass
Mite	0.0001	2.6587 mg	0.041 gr
Minim, Demi-Grain	0.001	2.6587 cg	0.41 gr
Carat	0.01	2.6587 dg	4.103 gr
Double Scruple	0.1	2.6587 g	41.03 gr
Ounce	1 m_{H_{2}O}(1 in^{3})	2.6587 dag	0.938 oz
Pound	10	2.6587 hg	9.38 oz
Stone	100	2.6587 kg	5.86 lb
Kental	1000	26.587 kg	58.6 lb
Hogshead	10000	265.87 kg	586.14 lb

The transcript of the original document gives the value of a kental as 16 stones at one point and 10 stones in another point. 10 was presumably the intended value, given the otherwise consistent decimalization.

== Subsequent developments ==
Under the United States Constitution, Article 1 Section 8, Congress shall have power "To coin Money, regulate the Value thereof, and of foreign Coin, and fix the Standard of Weights and Measures". In his first annual message to Congress (what later came to be called "State of the Union Addresses") on January 8, 1790 (a few months before Jefferson's report to the House of Representatives), George Washington stated, "Uniformity in the currency, weights, and measures of the United States is an object of great importance, and will, I am persuaded, be duly attended to."

Washington repeated similar calls for action in his second and third annual messages (after Jefferson's report). Jefferson's decimal proposal had the support of Alexander Hamilton, James Madison, James Monroe, and George Washington. Robert Morris was a powerful opponent of the proposal. In late 1791 the Senate appointed a committee to report on the subject and make recommendations. The committee reported in April 1792, unanimously endorsing Jefferson's decimal system. The Senate was slow to act on the matter and while they delayed, events in France complicated the issue. Although French scientists working on a decimal system had originally supported using the seconds pendulum as a scientific basis, and Jefferson had deliberately matched his seconds pendulum proposal to the French one, based on a measurement at the latitude of Paris, the French decided to use the length of a meridian of the Earth instead of a seconds pendulum. This and other developments changed what had promised to be an internationally developed system into a strictly French project. Jefferson wrote, "The element of measure adopted by the National Assembly excludes, ipso facto, every nation on earth from a communion of measurement with them."

The Senate continued to consider Jefferson's two proposals, along with a number of new proposals, for several years. In 1795, a bill titled "An Act directing certain experiments to be made to ascertain uniform standards of weights and measures for the United States" was passed by the House and was approved by committee in the Senate, but on the last day of the session the Senate said it would consider the bill during the next session. The bill was never taken up again. In 1795, the Northwest Indian War, which for years had prevented the surveying and sale of land in the Northwest Territory came to an end. A land rush of settlers, surveyors, squatters, and others rapidly pushed into the region and the federal government had a sudden and intense need to establish a method for surveying and selling land. On May 18, 1796, Congress passed "an Act for the sale of land of the United States in the territory northwest of the River Ohio, and above the mouth of the Kentucky River". This law defined a survey grid system of 6–mile–square townships divided into 1–mile–square sections, with the defining unit being the chain, specifically Gunter's chain. This was the first unit of measurement designated into law by Congress. This law and the way it defined the survey grid ended debate over Jefferson's decimal system.

== Origins ==
The proposal by William Waring from 30 January 1790 was similarly decimalized as Jefferson's more radical proposal, but introduces many new names for units and its base is the equatorial seconds pendulum, i.e. determined at 0° not 45°, called pend or federal ell. A federal gallon of 0.004 cubic pends, i.e. slightly less than 4 liters and thus similar in size to the English wine gallon, is suggested as a more traditional base for liquid measures; and 9 such gallons, since almost equal to a Winchester bushel, or, more systematically, 10 gallons would form the base for dry measures. Inspired by the Avoirdupois system defining 1 cubic foot of water to weigh 1000 ounces of which there are 16 to the pound, Waring suggests a federal pound of half a cubic hand of water, which would be just short of 500 g.

Waring's proposal
Unit	Definition	Jeffersonian equivalence
"Lineal Measure"
Min	0.1 decu	1/3 line
Decu	0.1 hand	1/3 inch
Hand	0.1 pend	1/3 foot
Pend, Ell	ca. 39 inches	1/3 decad
Caten	10 pends	1/3 rood
Muta	10 catens	1/3 furlong
Mile	10 mutas	1/3 mile
League	10 miles	3 1/3 miles
"Plane Measure"
Med	10 square decus	1 1/9 square inches
Foot	10 square hands	1 1/9 square feet
Floor or Square	10 square pends	1 1/9 square decads
Rood	10 square catens	1 1/9 roods
Acre	10 roods = 1 square muta	1 1/9 double-acre
Hide	10 acres	1 1 1/9 double-acres
"Solid Measure"
Bimin	10 cubic mins	10/27 cubic lines
Trimin	10 bimins	3 19/27 cubic lines
Bidecu	10 cubic decus	10/27 metre
Tridecu	10 bidecus	10/27 demi-pints
Bihand	10 cubic hands	10/27 bushel
Trihand	10 bihands	10/27 quarter
"Liquid Measure"
Met	0.1 pint	4/27 demi-pint
Pint	0.1 gallon	4/27 pottle
Gallon	4 cubic hands	4/27 bushel
Firkin	10 gallons	4/27 quarter
Vas or Hogshead	10 firkins	4/27 last
"Dry Measure"
Manu	0.1 pottle	1 1/3 or 1 13/27 demi-pint
Pottle	0.1 bushel	1 1/3 or 1 13/27 pottle
Bushel	9 or 10 gallons	1 1/3 or 1 13/27 bushel
Seem	10 bushels	1 1/3 or 1 13/27 quarter
Way	10 seems	1 1/3 or 1 13/27 last
"Weights"
Grain	0.1 dram	1 23/27 carat
Dram	0.1 ounce	1 23/27 double-scruple
Ounce	0.1 pound	1 23/27 ounce
Pound	m_{H_{2}O}(0.5 cubic hand)	1 23/27 pound
Stone	10 pounds	1 23/27 stone
Centon	10 stones	1 23/27 kental
Mille	10 centons	1 23/27 hogshead
Quinton	10 milles	18 14/27 hogsheads

== See also ==
- Approximate conversion of units
- Mesures usuelles
- Metrication in the United States
- Seconds pendulum
- United States customary units
