= Zupko =

Zupko is a surname. Notable people with the surname include:

- Ronald Edward Zupko, American historian, metrologist
- John Alexander Zupko, author of Jean Buridan's Philosophy of Mind
- Ramon Zupko, winner of the 1980 Kennedy Center Friedheim Award
- Sarah Zupko, founder of PopMatters (webzine)

== Countries with more Zupko in the world ==
- United States(620)
- Czech Republic(138)
- Slovakia (120)
- Serbia (39)
- Canada (27)
- Hungary (18)
- Brazil(8)
- Russia(5)
- Ukraine (5)
- England (3)
- Germany (2)
- Argentina (1)
- Belgium(1)
- Belarus(1)
- Ireland(1)
- Kazakhstan (1)
- Latvia (1)
- Transnistria (1)
- Sweden (1)
- Source
