= Exchequer =

UK government accounting process

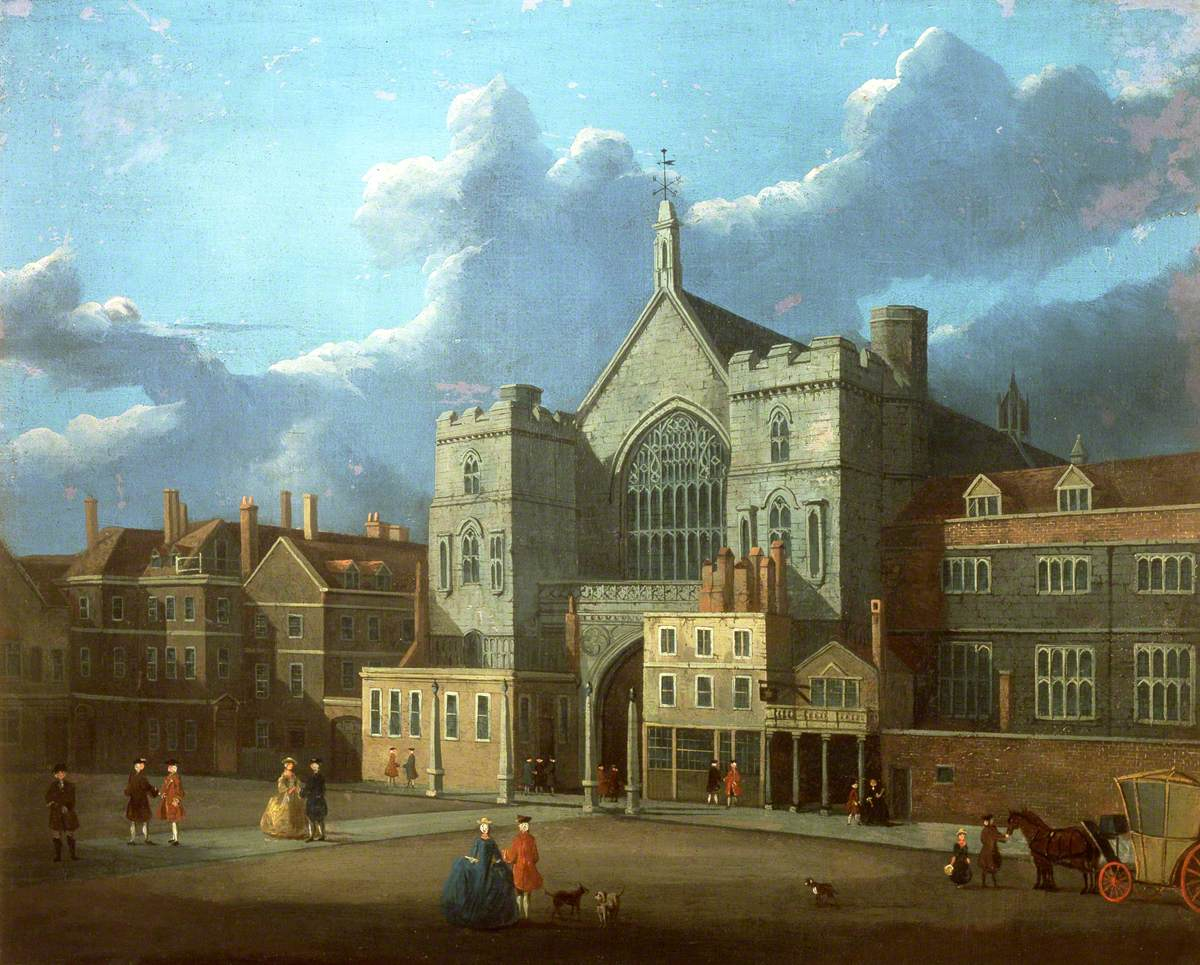
An 18th-century view of New Palace Yard, home of the English Exchequer from the 12th to the 19th century: the building to the right of Westminster Hall housed the Court of Exchequer, the buildings to the left housed the offices of the Exchequer of Receipt.

The UK Exchequer (formally His Majesty's Exchequer) is part of the machinery of government, defined as 'the legal and accounting entities which support the UK's spending and revenue activities'. The term is used for the accounting processes of central government, and as such it appears in various financial documents (including the latest departmental and agency annual accounts). The Consolidated Fund account at the Bank of England is officially termed 'The Account of His Majesty's Exchequer': It serves as the government's current account, into which is paid the money raised from taxation (and other government revenues), and out of which is issued money for government spending.

Historically the Exchequer (the Court of Exchequer) was an executive body, having the combined characteristics of a government department and a court of law. It was responsible for the collection and the management of taxes and revenues, making payments on behalf of the sovereign and auditing official accounts. Twice a year, at Easter and Michaelmas, those responsible for collecting the king's revenue (sheriffs, bailiffs, escheators and others) were summoned to the Exchequer to deposit the money and account for all that was owed.

The existence of an Exchequer in England was first recorded in 1110. Similar offices were established in Normandy (by 1180), in Scotland around 1200 and in Ireland in 1210.

Alongside its accountancy responsibilities, the Exchequer had a judicial character. Its primary function in this regard was as a court of revenue: concerned with asserting and protecting 'the royal prerogative in matters regarding the King's revenue', as well as enforcing payments and preventing fraud. From an early date, however, the Exchequer developed a broader jurisdiction (and secondary function) as a court of common pleas: 'hearing and determining personal suits and actions at law between subject and subject'. Over time, the principle of equity was admitted into the judicial workings of the Exchequer, which then came to be recognised as a court of equity as well as a court of law. In the Tudor period the judicial work of the Exchequer further expanded: the Court of Augmentations and the Court of First Fruits and Tenths were both merged into the Exchequer, significantly increasing its workload.

The old Exchequer continued in operation until the 1830s, after which its various offices were gradually and progressively abolished (with their functions being transferred to other departments of state or courts of law). The Exchequer as presently constituted dates from the passing of the Exchequer and Audit Departments Act 1866, which remains in force in relation to the accounting processes of HM Government. It is 'one of the oldest surviving institutions of its type in the world'.

== Etymology ==
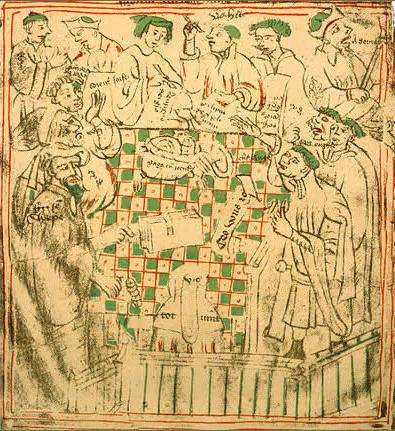
The Exchequer of Ireland in the fifteenth century.

The Exchequer was named after a table used to perform calculations for taxes and goods in the medieval period. According to the Dialogus de Scaccario (the 'Dialogue concerning the Exchequer', an early medieval work describing the practice of the Exchequer), the table was large, 10 feet (3.0 m) by 5 feet (1.5 m) with a raised edge or "lip" on all sides (of about the height of four fingers to ensure that nothing fell off it), upon which counters were placed representing various values. The name Exchequer referred to the resemblance of the table to a chess board (French: échiquier) as it was covered by a black cloth bearing stripes of about the breadth of a human hand in a chequer-pattern. The spaces represented pounds, shillings and pence. It has been suggested that this was necessary because many of those who were responsible for collecting and submitting taxes, were unable to read or write; more straightforwardly, the counting table provided a useful and practical means of calculating, in plain sight, how much was owed and how much had been paid.

== Exchequer in England and Wales ==
Like other offices of state in England, the Exchequer originally formed part of the Curia Regis or King's court. The royal court was the centre of government administration and finance. No distinction was made between the King's money and the public finances. It was also the seat of justice, cases being heard in the Aula Regis (the Great Hall of the king's palace).

In origin, His Majesty's Treasury was a strong box kept in the king's chamber and therefore it was overseen by the king's Chamberlains (who remained in charge even after it had been given a more secure and permanent base in Winchester Castle). The Treasury was, first and foremost, the place where the money was stored. The Exchequer, on the other hand, emerged (in the early 12th century) as a financial office: 'the Curia sitting for financial purposes'. As such, it was, by default, staffed and overseen by the Great Officers of State. By the reign of Henry II, in the mid-12th century, the Exchequer had come to be based in the Palace of Westminster (the monarch's principal royal residence in London), though occasionally (up until 1339) it sat elsewhere. By the time King John came to the throne, the king's treasury had been removed from Winchester to Westminster.

By the end of the 12th century, the Exchequer had begun to separate itself from the Curia Regis and was operating more-or-less independently both as an administrative and as a judicial body. When in session it was termed the King's Court at the Exchequer (Curia Regis ad Scaccarium). Those involved in its oversight included the aforementioned Chamberlains, the Chief Justiciar (the senior judge and de facto chief minister of the kingdom), the king's Chancellor (who was head of his writing office and custodian of the Great Seal of the Realm) and his Treasurer (a comparatively junior official at this time); the Chancellor and Treasurer were clerics, the Chamberlains were laymen.

=== The early Exchequer (12th and 13th centuries) ===
==== Origins ====
When the Exchequer was established is not known, but the earliest mention appears in a royal writ of 1110 (during the reign of King Henry I), addressed from Roger of Salisbury and Ranulf the Chancellor to the barones de scaccario (Barons of the Exchequer). The oldest surviving Pipe Roll dates from 1130 and is already in mature form (indicating that such records existed for some time beforehand, although they do not survive). The Pipe Rolls form a mostly continuous record of royal revenues and taxation (though not all revenue went into the Exchequer, so some taxes and levies were never recorded in the Pipe Rolls). A document known as the Dialogus de Scaccario ('Dialogue concerning the Exchequer') provides a detailed description of the Exchequer and its workings in the reign of Henry II; it is believed to date from the late 1170s.

According to the Dialogue, the Exchequer is "said to have begun with the very conquest of the kingdom made by king William, the arrangement being taken [...] from the exchequer across the seas" (i.e. the Exchequer of Normandy); albeit "they differ in very many and almost the most important points". Some scholars, including Thomas Madox (in his 1769 History of the Exchequer), have accepted the likelihood of this proposition; others, such as 19th-century constitutional historian William Stubbs, have dissented from it. Either way, there are no extant records of the Exchequer of Normandy from before 1180.

The Exchequer's modus operandi came to be referred to, with reverence, as the Course of the Exchequer: appeal was frequently (and often selectively) made to the 'ancient Course' by officers of the Exchequer in order to justify claims of precedence and particular ways of working.

==== Constitution ====
The Dialogue concerning the Exchequer describes the c. 1180 Exchequer as split into two components, which it terms the 'upper Exchequer' and the 'lower Exchequer'. The upper Exchequer (usually referred to simply as 'the Exchequer', formally the Court of His Majesty's Exchequer) functioned as a Court of Audit: those appointed as Barons of the Exchequer would sit at the counting table (with its distinctive chequered cloth) where, one by one, the sheriffs of the kingdom (and others with responsibility for Crown revenues (Note: E.g. stewards and bailiffs of honours, bailiffs and reeves of towns, guardians of the temporalities of vacant bishoprics and abbacies, guardians of escheated baronies and other fiefs, and guilds of craftsmen.)) would present themselves to account for monies (rents and other income) which they had received on behalf of the King. The lower Exchequer (known as the Exchequer of Receipt, formally the Court of the Receipt of His Majesty's Exchequer) was where these monies were deposited (and wooden tally sticks issued as a receipt for each deposit). The two were inextricably connected: 'whatever is declared payable at the greater [upper] one is here [at the lower] paid; and whatever has been paid here is accounted for there'.

The 12th-century Exchequer normally sat twice a year: at Easter and Michaelmas. The Exchequer year ended on 29 September (the feast of Michaelmas); thus at Michaelmas (at the "Scaccarium S. Michaelis") the sheriffs were required to present their final account for the year, while at Easter (the "Scaccarium Paschæ") they were required to present an interim account. The Exchequer of Receipt at this time only operated while the Exchequer itself was in session; afterwards the chests of money were taken and deposited in the Treasury at Winchester.

Originally, the Exchequer's jurisdiction covered only such matters as were associated with the king's revenue; however, owing to the Barons' experience in weighing evidence and passing judgements, the king began to look to the Exchequer to settle disputes between his subjects (particularly those concerning property and possessions). (Note: For example, by the 1170s fine of lands suits were regularly (though not exclusively) heard at the Exchequer.)

At that time, the only courts sitting at Westminster were the Exchequer and the Curia Regis itself. During the reign of King John, what would become the Court of Common Pleas began to emerge, its explicit purpose being to hold pleas of 'all civil causes at Common Law between subject and subject in actions real personal and mixed'; nevertheless, the emergence of this new court did not prevent civil pleas still being heard in the Exchequer. While the chief purpose of the latter was always "to decide on all matters affecting the rights and revenues of the crown" (indeed "in all cases where the sovereign's revenue is affected the Exchequer is the only court where the question can be tried"), the 'Plea side' ('hearing and determining personal suits and actions of law between subject and subject') continued operate, alongside the 'Revenue side', right up until the court's demise in the late-19th century.

=== Operation ===
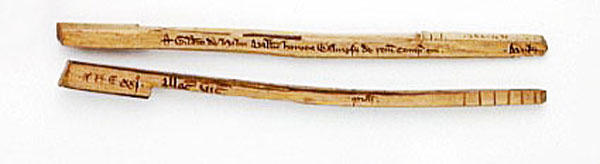
Tally sticks were issued by the Exchequer as a receipt for money paid in (the amount being recorded both in writing and in 'notches', cut into the wood). Pictured are the 'stocks' issued to the depositor; a parallel 'foil' would have been separated from the stock at the time of issue and kept by the Exchequer.

The operation of the medieval Exchequer, as first described in the Dialogue, is summarised below.

==== Summonses ====
Under Henry I, the procedure adopted for the audit involved a writ of summons being issued to each sheriff, twice yearly, requiring him to come before the Exchequer with an account of the income in his shire. It included a detailed statement of all amounts due (determined in part by reference to the previous year's Roll). Income to be accounted for usually included the county farm (a fixed sum payable in lieu of income from royal demesne lands), debts carried over from the previous year, amercements levied at the general eyres and forest eyres, taxes such as scutage and tallage, "oblata" (payments made in return for favours) and other miscellaneous items.

The summons came to be known as the 'Summons of the Pipe'. It required the sheriff to bring to the Exchequer: money to be paid in, tallies (as proof of deposit) for money already paid in, and copies of any writs or quittances (which made allowances for out-of-pocket expenses). Information on amercements was estreated [extracted] in advance from the plea rolls of the lower courts and sent to the Exchequer (in the form of an "estreat roll") to be incorporated in the summonses. Similarly, the Chancery extracted information from its fine rolls, which included a record of every grant of land made in that office on which rents were reserved or fines payable; this was compiled into a document known as the "originalia roll", which was likewise sent to the Exchequer to be used in the preparation of the summonses.

==== Tallies ====
There were two types of tally issued by the Exchequer: 'tallies of sol.' were issued as proof of money paid (Latin: solutum) into the Exchequer of Receipt; 'tallies of pro' were a form of financial instrument, issued for the benefit of ('pro') an accountant (e.g. a sheriff), authorising him to make a direct payment to a third party out of revenue collected (without the sum having to be first deposited and then withdrawn from the Exchequer of Receipt). In the mid-1280s the use of these tallies was regulated by letters patent issued by king Edward I.

==== The lower Exchequer ====
Before appearing before the Barons, each sheriff had to go to the Exchequer of Receipt to pay in what was due. Payment was normally made in the form of silver pennies; it was not unusual for a sheriff to deposit tens of thousands of coins, amounting to several hundred pounds sterling. The coins were counted by the tellers and separated into 100-shilling (£5) batches. Periodically a mixed selection of 240 pennies would be separated off by the Chamberlains of the Receipt (Note: The Chamberlains were represented in the Receipt by a pair of knights who served as their deputies.) and weighed against a Tower pound; if the coins were too far below the requisite weight the whole deposit could (in theory) be rejected. Each £5 batch was also weighed, before being loaded into £100 sacks (which, when filled, were sealed by the Treasurer's clerk). The sacks were stored in strong boxes with double locks (requiring the presence of both Chamberlains to unlock them), over which the Treasurer's clerk again set his seal. (Note: Later a third lock, for the Treasurer's clerk, was used in place of the seal.)

At Westminster (where the main Exchequer of Receipt was located), the tellers, who were clerks, occupied an office on the upper floor where they received and counted the money. Once the money had been deposited, the details of the deposit were written on a parchment (a 'teller's bill'), which was sent down a pipe to the Tally Court (the room below). Here, the Treasurer's clerk copied the details on to the tally stick, and also made an entry on the Receipt roll (the pell of Introitus). passed to the Chamberlains' staff who cut a tally for each deposit made. Finally, after everything had been checked, the Chamberlains split the tally: the 'stock' would be given to the sheriff and the 'foil' kept by the Exchequer. Like the Court of Exchequer itself, the Tally Court was furnished with a large table, covered with a chequered cloth, and seats for the senior officers.

Money could only be issued from the Exchequer of Receipt on royal authority, issued to the Treasurer and Chamberlains by writ 'of Liberate'.

==== The upper Exchequer ====
In the upper Exchequer the sheriff handed over his summons, which itemised the payments which had been required of him; he then produced the relevant tally stock as proof of payment for each sum deposited (and this was immediately checked by the Chamberlains against the corresponding tally foil). The total amount paid in (totted up using the counters on the table) was then compared against the amount due, and if there was a shortfall (after authorised expenses had been taken into account), then the Barons would judge whether the money owed could be carried forward, or whether the account-holder should be detained pending full payment. The Barons had use of a privy chamber (thalamus secretorum) where they could withdraw if necessary to consider points in private, so that the ongoing accounting business of the Exchequer was not thereby necessarily delayed.

Many Exchequer payments (including most of the county 'farms') were reckoned 'in blanch', meaning that an additional payment had to be paid (to make up for any discrepancy between the face value and actual silver content of the coinage used). At times the level of this payment was ascertained by assay: coins with a total face value of £1 were melted down and the silver ingot produced was solemnly weighed against a pound weight before the Barons; at other times a notional blanch of a shilling in the pound (i.e. 5%) was used.

When everything had been accounted for, the sheriff having been judged to have correctly paid all that was due, he was duly granted his Quietus: a written statement of his acquittal.

=== Personnel ===
In the upper Exchequer, the Chief Justiciar (who presided, in the absence of the king (Note: On occasion the king himself presided.)) sat at the head of the table. Facing him (across the table) sat the sheriff (or other person) whose account was being examined. On the Justiciar's left sat the king's Chancellor and others who had been appointed as Barons of the Exchequer for the duration of the session. The Chancellor attended with the Great Seal of the Realm, which served as the seal of the Exchequer. (Up until the early 13th century the Great Seal was ordinarily kept in the 'Treasury of the Exchequer' when not in use).

==== Barons of the Exchequer ====
The Barons of the Exchequer were described in the Dialogue as 'certain who excel in greatness and discretion, whether they be of the clergy or of the Court', sitting 'by the mere command of the Sovereign, and so with temporary authority'. Their role was 'to decide rights and to determine questions that arise; for the special science of the Exchequer consists not in accounts but in judgements of all sorts'. It was still the norm at this time for Great Officers of the State to serve as Barons by virtue of their office (though others would be appointed in their place if they were otherwise engaged, which often happened as they frequently had duties elsewhere). Those chosen to serve as Barons for the forthcoming session 'by reason of their office or by mandate of their prince' were called to attend by writ of summons.

Alongside the Justiciar and the Chancellor, those usually appointed Barons by reason of their office were the Constable, two Chamberlains and the Marshal. Each had particular roles with regard to the Exchequer when it was in session: the Constable would witness (with the Justiciar) any writs that were drawn up (e.g. for the issuing of money or the discharge of debts); the Chamberlains were the deputies of the Master Chamberlain who had oversight of the Treasury (unlike the other Barons, the Chamberlains had duties in the lower as well as the upper Exchequer); the Marshal was responsible for detaining any individuals who failed to satisfy the Barons with their account, and afterwards (if the court so required) placing them in custody.

Around 1234, the office of Baron of the Exchequer began to emerge as a permanent appointment with its own distinct status, function and salary. At around the same time, the judicial business of the Exchequer began to be placed on a more formal footing: the earliest plea rolls of the Exchequer date from 1236. The Barons, however, were more revenue specialists than jurists at this time.

==== Clerks and other officers ====
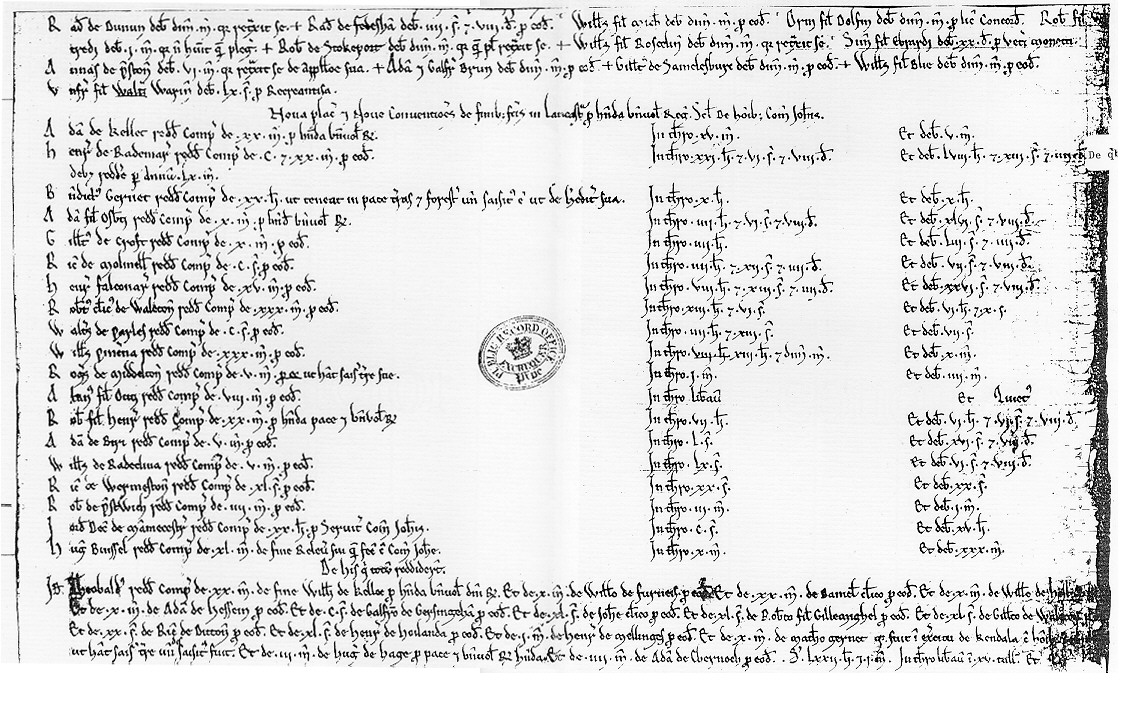
Part of the record of payments for the County of Lancaster in the Great Roll of the Pipe for the Sixth Year of King Richard I, Michaelmas 1194.

Seated along the long side of the table, at the right hand of the Justiciar, were the king's Treasurer and the clerks who were tasked with making a record of the proceedings: the Treasurer's clerk (later 'Clerk of the Pipe') was responsible for the Treasury Roll (also known as the Great Roll of the Exchequer or Pipe Roll). The Chancellor's clerk (later 'Comptroller of the Pipe') was responsible for the Chancellor's Roll (which was a duplicate record of proceedings and served as a counter-roll); he was also responsible for drawing up writs to be issued through the court. The Constable's clerk was also present (he played a key role in maintaining communication with the king's Court; for example, if a sheriff produced a writ from the king in court permitting or excusing him certain payments, the Constable's clerk would be responsible for producing the counter-writ and checking the one against the other).

Facing them across the table sat the Chamberlains' serjeant (who had with him the counter-tallies from the lower Exchequer, for checking against the tallies brought by the sheriffs), the Chancellor's deputy (the Magister Scriptorii, a forerunner of the Master of the Rolls) and, between them, the 'calculator' responsible for placing the counters on the counting table.

The king could appoint others to sit at the Exchequer in addition to the office-holders listed above; for example, the Dialogue lists the Bishop of Winchester (Richard of Ilchester) as having a seat at the table at that time (as a personal appointee rather than an office-holder) and also Thomas Brun (who had been tasked with creating a third Exchequer Roll, so that the proceedings would be recorded in triplicate).

==== The Treasurer and Chamberlains ====
The king's Treasurer (who was also designated Treasurer of the Exchequer) and the two Chamberlains (usually called Chamberlains of the Exchequer) (Note: to distinguish them from the chamberlains of the Household) were the executive officers of the Exchequer. The Treasurer and his staff were clerics (and therefore literate), the Chamberlains and their staff were laymen. As well as having seats and duties in the upper Exchequer, the Treasurer and Chamberlains presided over the lower Exchequer, the Exchequer of Receipt, where they held joint responsibility for its transactions (their shared oversight functioning as an early form of internal audit).

Their duties in the Exchequer of Receipt were normally undertaken by deputies: those of the Treasurer by a clerk, those of the Chamberlains by a pair of knights (later called the Chamberlains of the Receipt). The clerk of the Treasurer was responsible for maintaining the written records of money paid in and paid out (the 'pells' of introitus and exitus, respectively), while the deputy Chamberlains and their staff were responsible for the cutting and issuing of tallies. As well as serving as Clerk of the Pells, the Treasurer's clerk functioned as Tally Writer, a duty which later developed into the separate office of Auditor of the Receipt of the Exchequer.

During the 13th century the office of Chief Justiciar gradually receded in importance (it had disappeared by the end of the reign of Henry III, i.e. by 1272). In place of the Justiciar, the king's Treasurer (whose influence in the realm was steadily growing) began to take precedence at the Exchequer. His role developed into the office of Lord High Treasurer of England; those appointed to this office were invariably appointed Treasurer of the Exchequer at the same time, by issue of a separate patent. After the appointment of Barons of the Exchequer became permanent, the Treasurer and Barons were viewed as the senior officers of the Upper Exchequer, and the Treasurer and Chamberlains as the senior officers of the Lower Exchequer (the Treasurer thus having overarching oversight).

==== Chancellor of the Exchequer ====
During the first part of the 13th century (by 1248 at the latest) the distinct office of Chancellor of the Exchequer emerged. At around this time the Chancery was increasingly gaining independence from the Curia Regis. The king's Chancellor (subsequently termed Chancellor of England) was now running a largely autonomous department of state. He continued to sit periodically as a Baron, but his clerk took over most of his other duties with regard to the Exchequer (and during the reign of Henry III he began to be termed 'Chancellor of the Exchequer'). At the same time, the Exchequer was provided with its own seal (the Great Seal of the Realm no longer being to hand), which was placed in the Chancellor of the Exchequer's keeping; he also took custody of the Chancellor's Roll (the counter-roll to the Pipe Roll).

==== Constable and Marshal of the Exchequer ====
In the early years of the Exchequer, the Constable of England (as de facto commander of the royal armies) and the Marshal of England (as his deputy) had duties in the Exchequer relating to the payment of soldiers (such as may have been hired during the year to supplement the provision of troops by feudal baronies and the like). Due to their having extensive duties elsewhere, these officers were frequently (and, by the mid-13th century, invariably) represented in the Exchequer by deputies (termed 'Constable of the Exchequer' and 'Marshal of the Exchequer' respectively). The former office was relatively short-lived, but the latter remained in place until the 1830s; (Note: The office of Marshal of the Exchequer is not recorded after 1833, and the offices of 'Marshal in the Courts of Common Pleas and Exchequer' were formally abolished (along with similar-named officials in other courts) by the Common Law Courts Act 1852.) appointments to it were made by the Hereditary Marshal of England up until 1601, after which the right to appoint was vested in the Crown.

==== Remembrancers of the Exchequer ====
By the end of the 12th century the business of the Exchequer had expanded to such an extent that it was sitting for much of the year. Increasing complexity led to the audit process for each County being separated into a preliminary and a final phase, with a proliferation of vouchers and memoranda being required to ensure continuity. By the mid-13th century a pair of Exchequer officers called Remembrancers had been appointed. Each kept what was known as a Memoranda Roll (one on behalf of the King, the other on behalf of the Treasurer); these supplemented the Pipe Roll by recording other items of Exchequer business from day to day.

By 1299 each was distinctly titled: the King's Remembrancer and the Treasurer's Remembrancer. Each went on to develop a distinct role: the King's Remembrancer's office managed the preliminary audit, the Treasurer's Remembrancer (later Lord Treasurer's Remembrancer)'s office managed the final audit. A parallel distinction was that the King's Remembrancer's office enforced the recovery of debts to the Crown, while the Treasurer's Remembrancer's office ensured the rendering of duties to the Crown. ('Debts' included payments arising from torts and trespasses, and other income not included on the Pipe Roll; 'duties' due to the king included 'rents, fines, issues, amerciaments and other things [...] received or levied by the Sheriff', which were recorded on the Pipe Roll).

As the revenue from trade and commerce began to eclipse feudal income, so the work of the King's Remembrancer greatly increased, while that of the Lord Treasurer's Remembrancer diminished.

==== Others ====
A distinct set of officers was responsible for the assays which routinely took place as part of the accounting process, including the melter and the weigher. In common with other lay offices in the Exchequer, these (comparatively lucrative) positions were held in fee, with deputies employed to perform the actual duties required; in time they became hereditary sinecures. Another such officer was the Usher of the Exchequer, who was responsible for the security of the building and its treasures. He was also entrusted with conveying the writs of summons to their various recipients, for which he oversaw a corps of messengers.

Other officers of the lower Exchequer included four tellers (clerks, who received and counted the money) and an usher who (like his counterpart in the upper Exchequer) was responsible for security.

=== Standard weights and measures ===
Following the proclamation of Magna Carta, legislation was enacted whereby the Exchequer would maintain the realm's prototypes for the yard and pound. These nominal standards were, however, only infrequently enforced on the localities around the kingdom. In 1279, the Exchequer was given custody of standard pieces of gold and silver, to be used in the Trial of the Pyx; when not in use they were kept in a strong box in the Pyx Chamber of Westminster Abbey, to which only the Chamberlains and Auditor of the Exchequer had keys.

=== Later developments (14th-17th centuries) ===
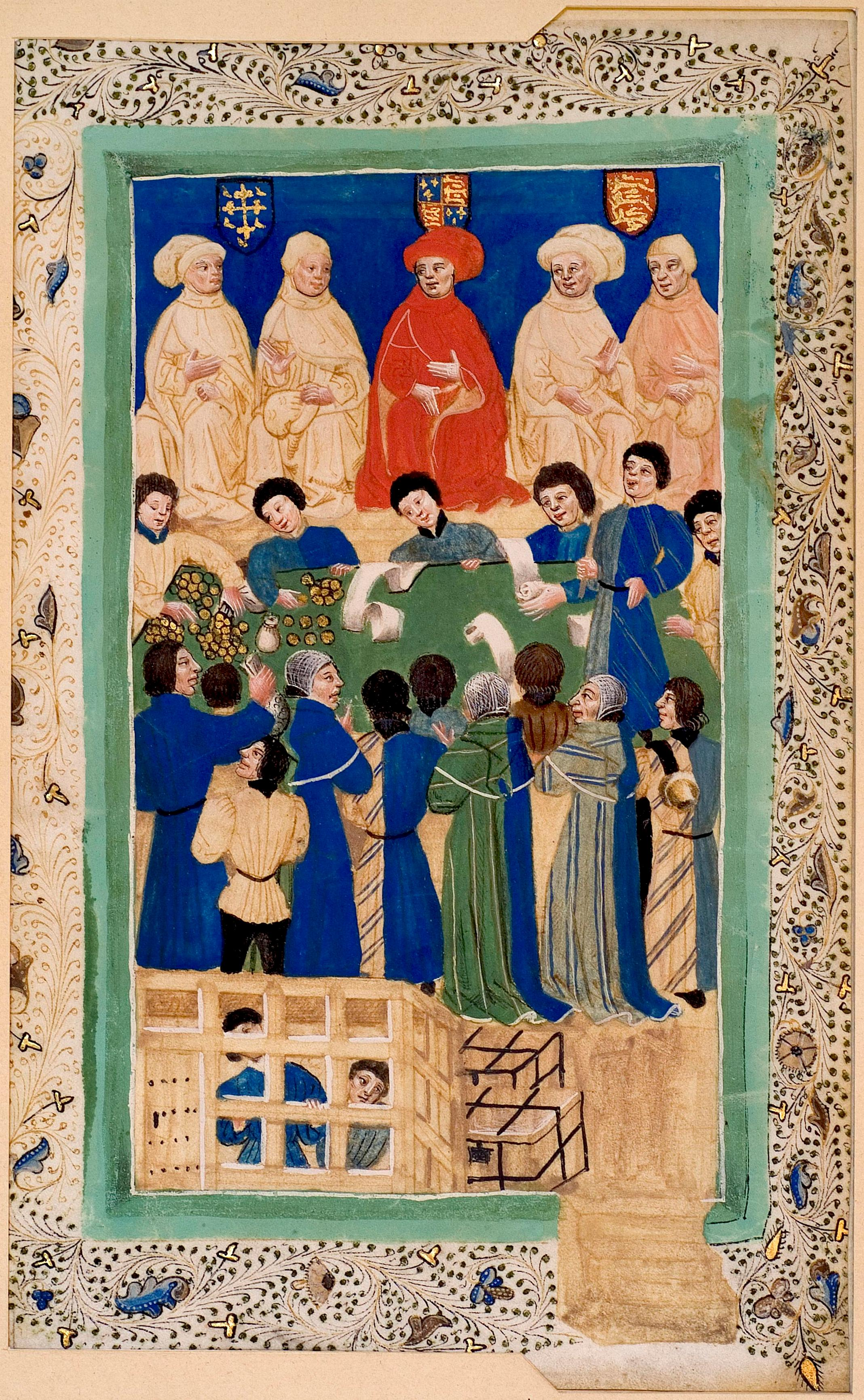
The Court of Exchequer, c. 1460.

==== Changes in the 14th-century ====
In the year 1300 the Court of the Exchequer was forbidden from hearing cases between the king's subjects. In spite of this, the practice persisted (and indeed grew) thanks to the employment of fictions (most notably the writ of quominus, by which a plaintiff in a case was able to suggest that the actions of the accused had rendered him less able to pay a debt to the king, thus placing the case under the jurisdiction of the Exchequer, notwithstanding the non-existence of any such debt in reality).

In the early 14th century, the accounting function of the (upper) Exchequer came to be distinguished from its judicial function; the former began to be termed the Exchequer of Account and the latter the Exchequer of Pleas. Formally, both were one and the same Court of Exchequer, but practically they functioned separately. 1317 saw the first appointment of a Chief Baron of the Exchequer, who (unlike the other barons) was a trained lawyer; appointed to preside at the Exchequer of Pleas.

During the 14th century the amount of 'casual' (as opposed to 'certain' or regular) income flowing into the Exchequer significantly increased. This casual income consisted mainly of fines, amercements and forfeited recognizances levied from around the kingdom by local courts of law or justices of the peace. (The Exchequer termed it 'foreign' income, possibly because it derived from proceedings in other courts.) The sheriffs had always had to account for both types of income, but, by the end of the reign of Edward III, they had to account for each separately: a Clerk of the Foreign Estreats was employed to draw up a separate writ for casual income (which was sealed with green wax and delivered to the sheriff alongside the regular writ of summons); and this money was then accounted for before a separate official called the Foreign Apposer (rather than before the barons) and checked against a separate record (the Estreat Roll) by the aforementioned clerk.

==== The Tudor period ====
In the 1490s around 90 percent of the king's revenue was received by the Exchequer. Although the Exchequer was the official way of receiving tax revenue for HM Government, there was never a way of knowing how much one had at a given time. Any report would take years to come to fruition. (Accounts of income and expenditure would eventually be presented to Parliament under King William III, but after the death of Queen Anne in 1714 this practice again fell into abeyance, and it would not be until 1823 that a full 'Balance-Sheet of the Public Income and Expenditure of the United Kingdom' began to be published annually).

By the start of the 16th century the Lord High Treasurer was the undisputed head of the Exchequer. The office of Chamberlain of the Exchequer, at one time the Treasurer's equal, was now a sinecure position; where once they had served as a check on the Treasurer and his clerks, their residual duties were now undertaken by deputies.

In 1512 the four Tellers of the Receipt of the Exchequer were made custodians of the money in their coffers, each being given a key to his own chest. The Pell of exitus was abolished and the Tellers (each of whom was made responsible for a different area of income and expenditure) kept their own account books, which were audited by the Tally Writer (henceforward termed the Auditor of the Receipt of the Exchequer). Following accusations of misappropriation of funds, however, the Pell of exitus was eventually revived in 1597. In addition to the Teller, the Auditor and the Clerk of the Pells held keys to each chest, and the presence of all three was required to open them. During the reign of Henry VIII, the Exchequer began to develop an Equity jurisdiction (clearly distinct from the Common Law jurisdiction of the Exchequer of Pleas). The Court of Exchequer in Equity sat separately (in the Exchequer Chamber) and was separately constituted and staffed.

Under Queen Mary, several courts which Henry had established following the dissolution of the monasteries (namely the Court of Augmentations, the Court of General Surveyors and the Court of First Fruits and Tenths) were absorbed into the Exchequer.

Prior to the reign of Elizabeth I, the Barons of the Exchequer (other than the Chief Baron) had been revenue specialists, appointed from among the officers of the Exchequer of Account. With the judicial work of the Exchequer increasing, however, Elizabeth appointed a Serjeant-at-law to be Baron when one of the positions fell vacant (unlike the other Barons, he was given the same judicial status as the judges of other courts). Subsequent vacancies were likewise filled by lawyers, and at the end of her reign only one non-lawyer Baron remained in post. He in turn retired (and was likewise replaced by a legal specialist). Subsequently, an additional Baron (of inferior rank) was appointed to take care of the revenue work of the Exchequer; he came to be known as the Cursitor Baron (Note: i.e. the 'Baron of the Course [of the Exchequer]', from the Latin cursus.).Subsequently, the sheriffs were examined (or 'apposed') with regard to their accounts by the Cursitor Baron alone. In time, these apposals took place in the Cursitor Baron's chambers, rather than in open court, though the Cursitor Baron did hold court (in the Tally Court of the Exchequer of Receipt) for the twice yearly 'proffers' at which the sheriffs and others deposited their dues.

Under Elizabeth I a pair of auditors were appointed: the Auditors of the Imprests. Operating out of the Exchequer, they were empowered to examine the accounts of all who had received public money on account or by way of imprest. They later employed deputies to undertake their duties. In the late 18th century the Auditors of the Imprests were found to be in possession of two of the most lucrative sinecures held under the Crown; each received an annual income of over £16,000, while their audit was judged to be entirely ineffective.

==== The Stuart period ====
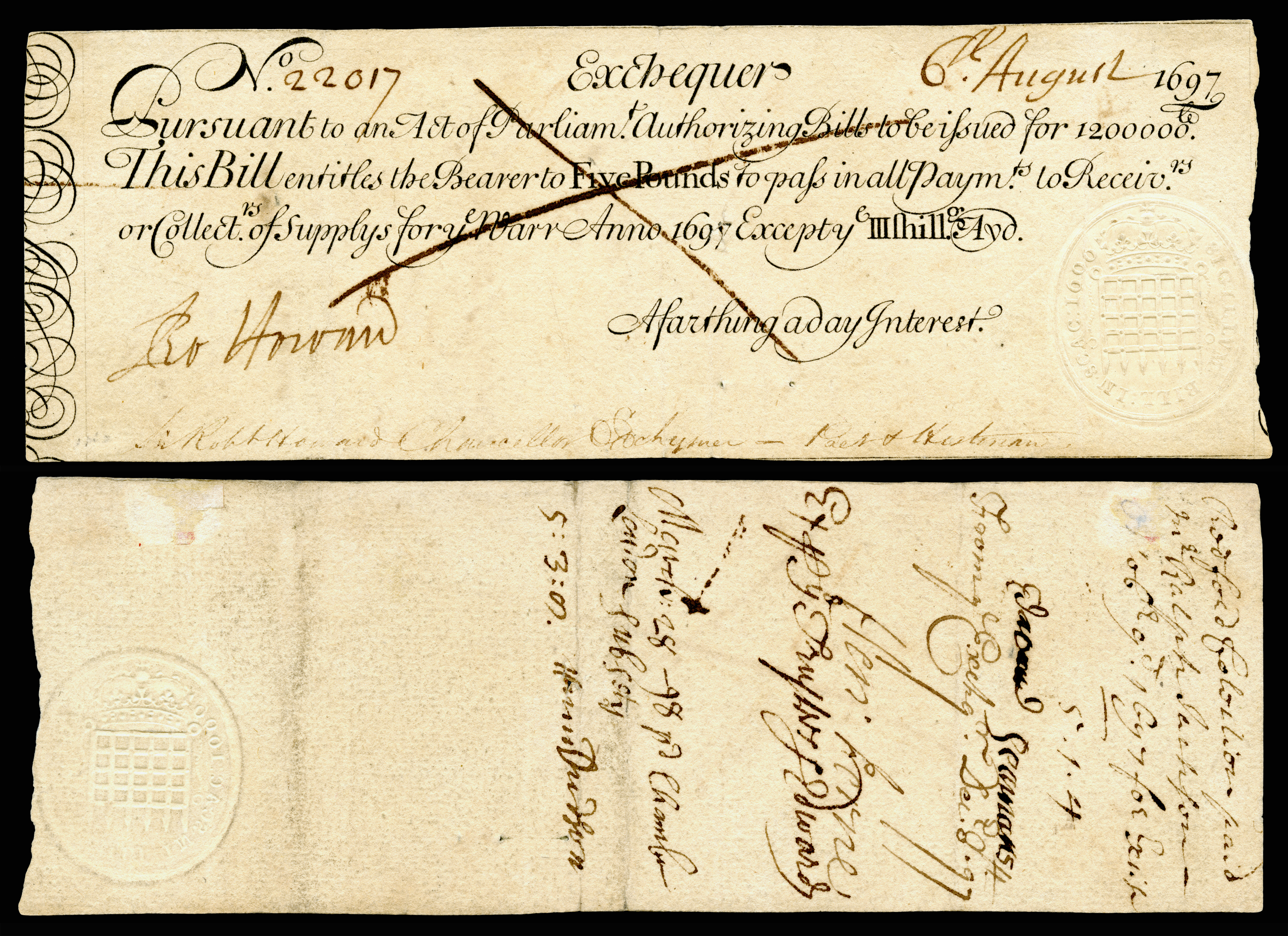
Exchequer bill (of the third issue), dated 6 August 1697

Through most of the 1600s, goldsmiths would deposit their reserve of treasure with the Exchequer, sanctioned by the government.

The Board of Customs was established in 1671; then, with the creation of new types of revenue, came the formation of new committees of oversight: e.g. the Board of Excise (1683), Board of Stamps (1694) and Board of Taxes (1718). Some of these boards were given (or assumed) quasi-judicial powers, which diluted the authority of the Barons of the Exchequer.

In the aftermath of the Second Dutch War, between 1667 and 1672, the government attempted to raise funds through 'fiduciary Exchequer money orders', an early example of government-issued negotiable interest-bearing securities. The goldsmith bankers invested heavily but the government was unable to meet its obligations, leading to the 'Great Stop of the Exchequer' in 1672: Charles II "shut up" the Exchequer, forbidding payments from it, in what Walter Bagehot described as "one of those monstrous frauds... this monstrous robbery". This ruined the goldsmiths and the credit of the Stuart government, which would never recover it. In 1694, the credit of William III's government was so bad in London that it could not borrow, which led to the foundation of the Governor and Company of the Bank of England.

A clause in the National Land Bank Act 1696 (7 & 8 Will. 3. c. 31) empowered the Exchequer to raise up to £1.5 million in the security of 'indented bills of credit', bearing interest at 3d per cent. per diem. They would be issued by the Tellers to any person willing to advance money to the government (the bills serving as their security); they could be passed from person to person as currency and would be cashed by the Tellers on demand. Known as Exchequer Bills, they remained in regular use as a source of Government revenue up until 1892.

=== Reform and decline (18th-19th centuries) ===
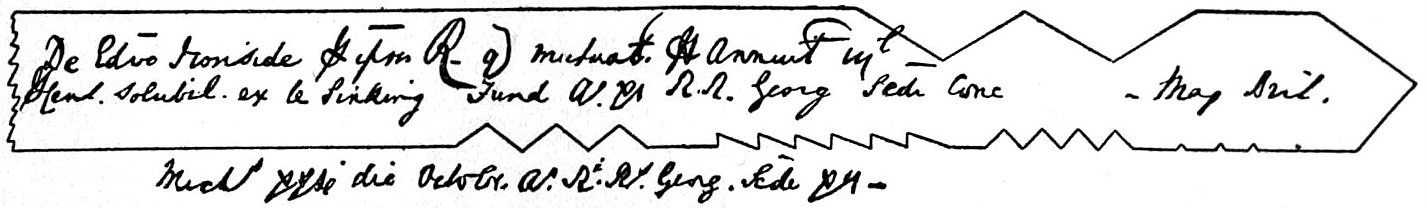
Diagram of an Exchequer tally issued in 1739, inscribed in Latin and with notches indicating receipt of £236 4s 3½d.

==== 18th century ====
The Proceedings in Courts of Justice Act 1730 (4 Geo. 2. c. 26) required the use of English (rather than Latin or French) in English courts of law (including in the Court of Exchequer), but the Court of the Receipt of HM Exchequer was explicitly exempted from the provisions of this act. Following its own long-established practices, the Exchequer of Receipt continued to use an abbreviated form of Latin together with Exchequer numerals ('a corrupted form of the old Roman figures') in its written records up until 1834.

The Receipt of the Exchequer Act 1783 (23 Geo. 3. c. 82) abolished a number of 'useless, expensive, and unnecessary Offices' connected with the Exchequer of Receipt, and laid the ground for other offices to be exercised in person by salaried officers (rather than held as sinecures, with deputies performing the duties). It also made provision for the age-old use of wooden tallies to be replaced with a system of 'indented Cheque Receipts', but this was only scheduled to take place 'upon the Death, Surrender, Forfeiture or Removal of the two Chamberlains in the Receipt of his Majesty's Exchequer' currently in post; this finally took place forty-four years later, when the last of the Chamberlains died in 1826.

The Auditors of the Imprests were abolished, by the Audit of Public Accounts Act 1785 (25 Geo. 3. c. 52), which appointed in their place a body of five Commissioners for Auditing the Public Accounts.

In 1787 the Consolidated Fund was established, following the passing of the Customs and Excise Act 1787 (27 Geo. 3. c. 13). Henceforward, 'all monies paid into the Exchequer, and not otherwise appropriated, [were] to be carried to the Consolidated Fund'.

The passing of the Bank Restriction Act 1797 (37 Geo. 3. c. 45) led to bank notes being accepted for payment of taxes; from that time a representative of the Bank of England had to attend the Exchequer daily to verify and remove all notes paid in at the Exchequer. Shortly afterwards, the Bank was authorised to receive payments directly from various receivers of revenue (including HM Customs, the Excise Office, the Stamp Office and others). Such payments were still technically made (and accounted for) at the Exchequer: transfer tickets were used by the Bank for the receipt and issue of funds (most offices in direct receipt of public funds had accounts at the Bank of England), and at the end of each day these were presented at the Exchequer of Receipt; the difference between the receipt and issue of funds was then reconciled by adding or subtracting money to or from the Tellers' chests.

==== 19th century ====
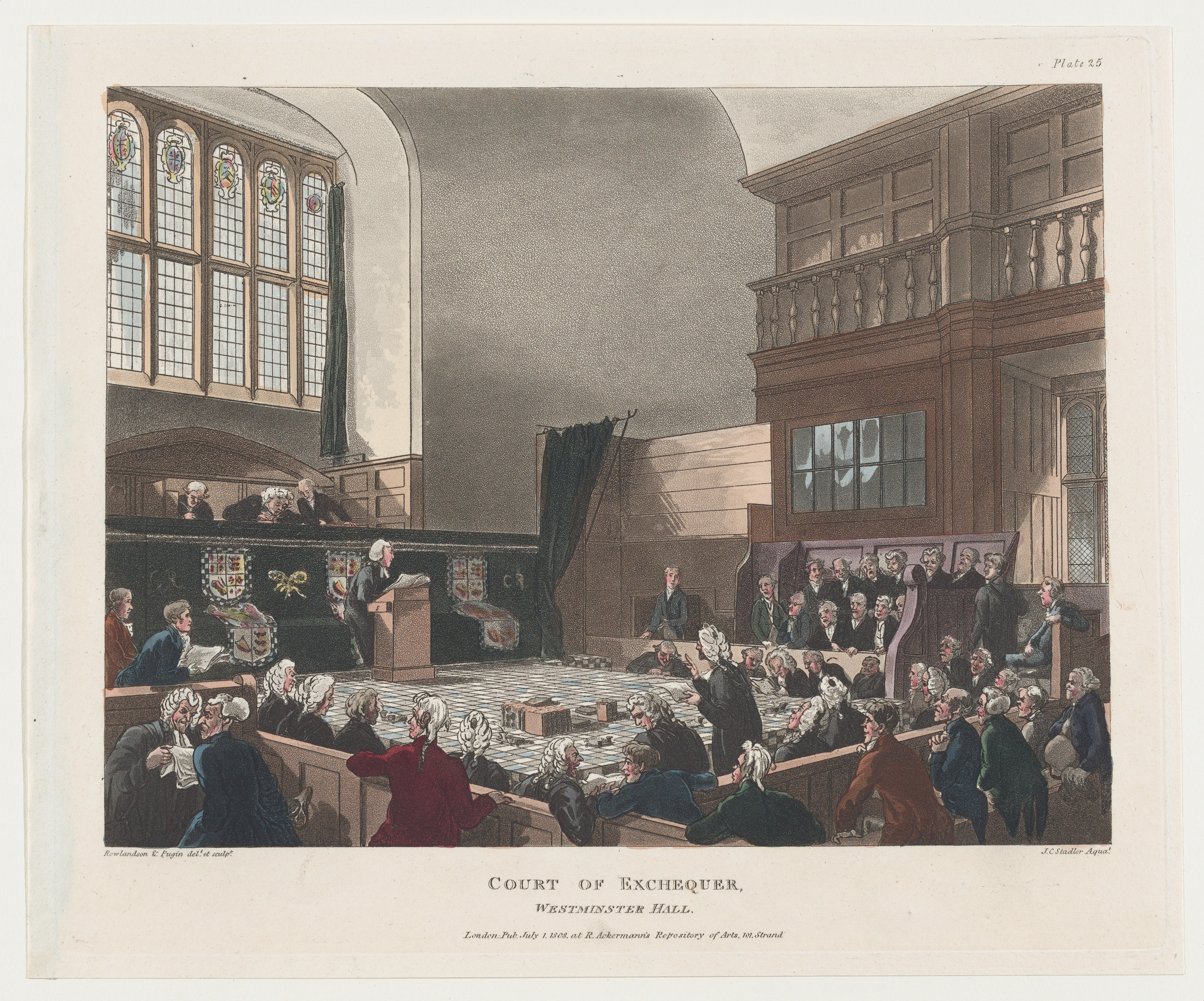
A trial underway in the Court of Exchequer in 1808. The court sits in a room 'contiguous to the north-west corner of Westminster Hall'; the Lord Chief Baron presides.

The Fines Act 1833 (3 & 4 Will. 4. c. 99) was passed 'for facilitating the Appointment of Sheriffs and the more effectual Audit and passing of their Accounts'. It described the established practice of auditing and passing the sheriffs' accounts in the Court of Exchequer as 'attended with unnecessary delay, expense and trouble'. Henceforth they were instead to submit their accounts to the Commissioners of Audit. The act further provided for the abolition of several offices of the Exchequer of Account (which were now rendered obsolete), including the Lord Treasurer's Remembrancer, the Clerk of the Pipe, the Comptroller of the Pipe, the Foreign Apposer, the Clerk of the Estreats and others. Any residual duties were to be vested in the King's Remembrancer.

A year later, the Office of Receipt of Exchequer Act 1834 (4 Will. 4. c. 15) was passed which reformed the Exchequer of Receipt: among others, the offices of Clerk of the Pells, Auditor of the Receipt of the Exchequer and the four Tellers of the Exchequer were all abolished. In their place a new official, the Comptroller General of the Receipt and Issue of His Majesty's Exchequer, was appointed. An account was opened at the Bank of England ('The Account of His Majesty's Exchequer') into which was deposited all the cash held in the tellers' chests; thenceforward, government departments collecting revenue paid it directly in to the Bank. Outgoing payments became the responsibility of a new officer, the Paymaster of Civil Services (whose role would in 1848 be merged into that of Paymaster General).

On 16 October 1834, an attempt to dispose of redundant tally sticks (which had been retained in large numbers and stored in the Tally Court of the Exchequer of Receipt) by burning them in the parliamentary furnaces caused the destruction of much of the old Palace of Westminster. The following year the Exchequer Department moved from Old Palace Yard to Whitehall Yard, to enable its former site to be cleared for the rebuilding of the Palace of Westminster.

In 1841 the Equity jurisdiction of the Exchequer was abolished; its work was amalgamated into the Court of Chancery.

The office of Cursitor Baron of HM Court of Exchequer at Westminster was abolished by the Cursitor Baron of the Exchequer Act 1856 (19 & 20 Vict. c. 86), 'the duties thereof having for the most part ceased'. (This took place after the office had fallen vacant following the death of George Bankes).

Under the Exchequer and Audit Departments Act 1866 (29 & 30 Vict. c. 39) the office of Comptroller General of the Exchequer was abolished and the Exchequer 'ceased to be a distinct Department of the State'. The Comptroller General's duties were combined with those of the Commissioners for auditing the Public Accounts under the new post of Comptroller and Auditor General, (whose office was named the Exchequer and Audit Department from 1866 until 1983 when the new National Audit Office was created). At the same time the Standards Department of the Board of Trade took over metrological responsibilities from the Comptroller General of the Exchequer; the standard weights and measures (previously held by the Chamberlains and then by the Auditor of the Receipt of the Exchequer) were moved to the Jewel Tower, a surviving part of the old Palace of Westminster. Meanwhile, responsibility for the Trial of the Pyx was handed to the Treasury, and the old standard pieces of gold and silver were entrusted to the care of the Royal Mint.

The Exchequer nevertheless continued thereafter to function as a court of law until the passing of the Supreme Court of Judicature Act 1873, whereupon it was reconstituted to form the Exchequer Division of the new High Court of Justice (with the Lord Chief Baron at its head). The ongoing existence of the Exchequer as a separate division of the High Court was only, however, a temporary and transitional arrangement: in 1880 the office of Lord Chief Baron was, by Order in Council, abolished and the business of the Exchequer Division absorbed into that of the Queen's Bench Division.

=== Modern Exchequer (20th-21st century) ===
The ancient office of Chancellor of the Exchequer (Chancellor and Under-Treasurer of HM Exchequer) remains extant as the title of the lead minister in HM Treasury (which includes, among its junior ministers, an Exchequer Secretary to the Treasury).

The Exchequer and Audit Departments Act 1866 continues to govern administration of the Consolidated Fund, which is held in the Exchequer account of the Bank of England. Parts of the act have been repealed by the Government Resources and Accounts Act 2000, which approved the introduction of accrual accounting in the public sector, both in individual departments and across the whole of government.

The full formal title of the Comptroller and Auditor General (the head of the National Audit Office) is Comptroller General of the Receipt and Issue of His Majesty’s Exchequer and Auditor General of Public Accounts.

The Supreme Court of Judicature Act 1881 provided that "the proceedings for the ordaining or nominating of sheriffs directed by an Act passed in the fourteenth year of King Edward the First [...] shall henceforth in every year take place in the Queen's Bench Division of the High Court of Justice at the same time and in the same manner as hath been heretofore accustomed in the Court of Exchequer". Thus once a year the defunct Court of Exchequer is 'fictionally' reconstituted: the Chancellor of the Exchequer nominally presides (albeit he or she 'has not attended in recent years'), and the ceremony is overseen by the King's Remembrancer. The Quit Rents ceremonies, which also take place on this occasion, were first attested (as an already well-established custom) in the reign of Henry III, the Sheriffs of London and Middlesex being required to account to the King in the Exchequer for certain pieces of land held in farm.

The 1881 act also provided that "the presentation and swearing of the Lord Mayor of the city of London which has heretofore taken place in the Court of Exchequer at Westminster after every annual election into that office [...] shall henceforth take place in the Queen's Bench Division of Her Majesty's High Court of Justice or before the judges of that Division at the same time and in the same manner as hath been heretofore accustomed in the Court of Exchequer"; this continues to take place annually as part of what is known as the Lord Mayor's Show.

In modern parlance, "exchequer" (in addition to its more specific meanings) is sometimes used as a broad synonym for HM Treasury, or else it can signify 'funds' in general (as in "the company's exchequer is low").

=== Officers ===
The following officers of the Exchequer were extant in 1800.

==== Revenue side ====
- Treasurer of the Exchequer (held in commission since 1714)
- Chancellor of the Exchequer
- Barons of the Exchequer (rendered obsolete by the Supreme Court of Judicature Act 1873)
- Chief Baron of the Exchequer (amalgamated in 1880 into the office of Lord Chief Justice of England)
- King's Remembrancer
- Lord Treasurer's Remembrancer (office abolished in 1833)
- Commissioners for Auditing the Public Accounts (replaced the Auditors of the Imprests in 1785; replaced by the Comptroller and Auditor General in 1866)
- Clerk of the Pipe (office abolished in 1833)
- Comptroller of the Pipe (office abolished in 1833)
- Foreign Apposer (office abolished in 1833)
- Clerk of the Foreign Estreats (office abolished in 1833)
- Clerk of the Nichills (office abolished in 1833)
- Surveyor of the Green Wax (office abolished in 1833)
- Surveyor General of the Land Revenues of the Crown (merged with the Commissioners of Woods and Forests in 1810)
- Auditors of the Land Revenue (originally termed Auditors of the Exchequer) (abolished in 1832)
- Clerk of the Pleas
- Attornies in the Office of Pleas
- Receiver General, the Alienation Office
- Remembrancer of First Fruits and Tenths
- Clerk of the Augmentation office

==== Receipt side ====
- Auditor of the Receipt of the Exchequer (office abolished in 1834)
- Chamberlains in the Receipt of HM Exchequer (office abolished in 1826)
- Clerk of the Pells (office abolished in 1834)
- Teller of the Receipt of the Exchequer (office abolished in 1834)

In 1834 the officers of the Exchequer of Receipt were replaced by the Comptroller General of the Receipt and Issue of HM Exchequer.

=== Location ===
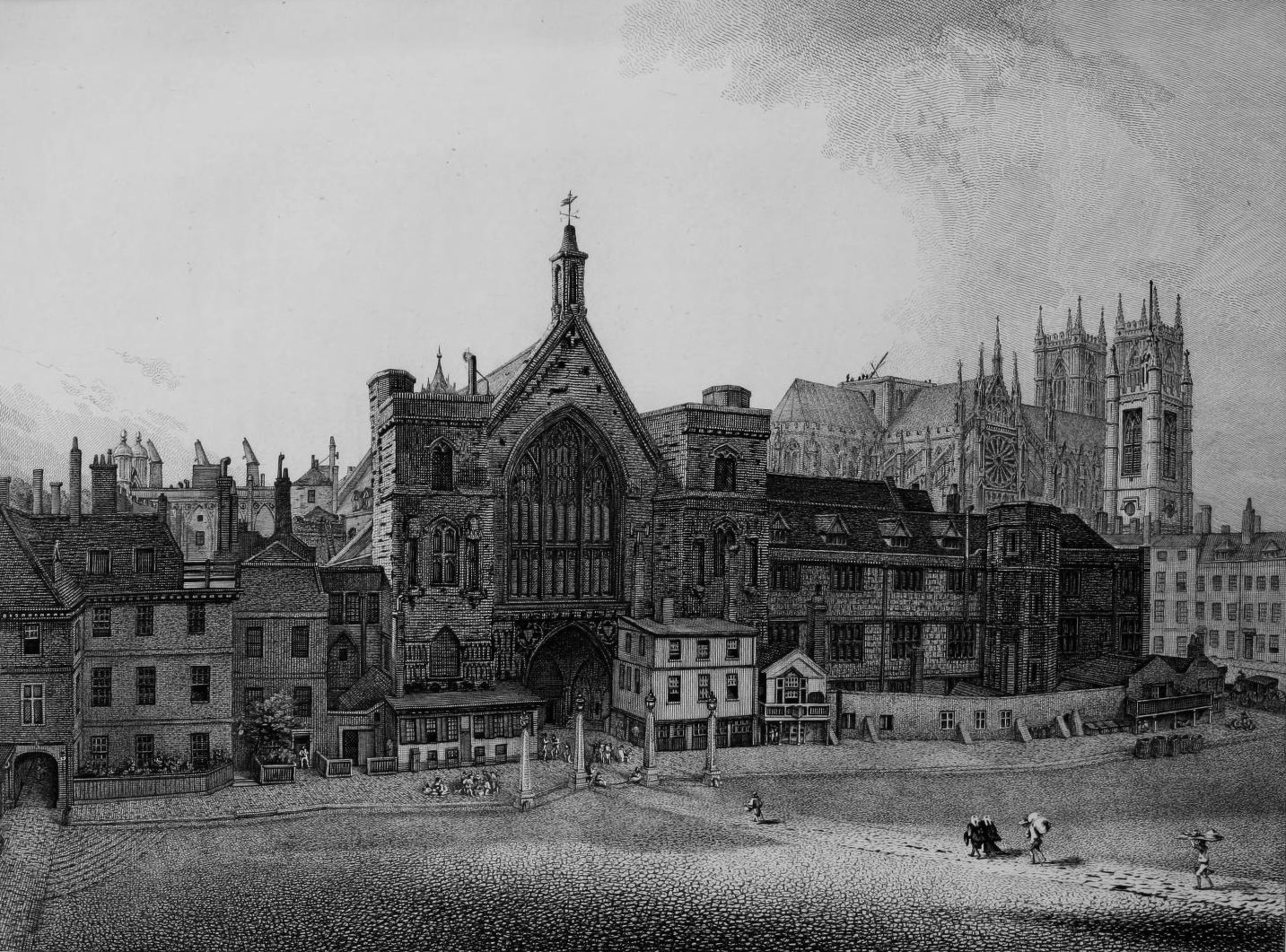
New Palace Yard in 1807. The building to the right (i.e. west) of Westminster Hall housed the Court of Exchequer, the buildings to the left housed the offices of the Exchequer of Receipt (which "stretched across the entrance to the Speaker's House to the east of the Hall towards the river").

From the mid-12th century the Exchequer was based at the Palace of Westminster (though it occasionally sat elsewhere, up until 1339). From the description given in the Dialogue, it seems that the upper and lower Exchequer were at that time co-located in a building to the east of Westminster Hall. During the reign of Henry III and prior to 1244 a new Exchequer building was constructed, adjoining the north-west corner of Westminster Hall, to house the upper Exchequer, while the lower Exchequer (the Exchequer of Receipt) remained in the older building to the east. Inside the main (north) entrance to the Hall, a broad staircase to the left led to the Exchequer of Receipt, while a corresponding staircase to the right led to the Court of Exchequer.

The Court of Exchequer itself occupied a large first-floor apartment (measuring 74 ft (23 m) by 45 ft (14 m)), which looked out on to New Palace Yard. In 1569-70 it was rebuilt in brick, though much of the 13th-century stonework was left intact. It remained in use as the Exchequer courtroom up until its demolition in 1823. The Exchequer Chamber occupied a room immediately to the south, located between the first and second buttresses of Westminster Hall. It too was rebuilt in the reign of Elizabeth I (in 1565–67) and was demolished in 1823.

In 1307, under Edward II, significant repairs were undertaken to the palace, which had been damaged by fire in the previous reign. As part of the refurbishment houses were erected 'for the convenience and use of the treasurer and barons of the exchequer'. In 1394 a set of cloisters (which still survive) was built alongside St Stephen's Chapel, south of the offices of the Receipt. After the dissolution of the monasteries, the former precincts of the chapel (including the cloisters) were converted into a grand house. In 1572 this dwelling reverted to the Crown and it went on to serve until 1794 as the official residence of the Auditor of the Receipt of the Exchequer; subsequently the same residence became the Speaker's House. The Tellers were accommodated in an adjoining building to the north; while in 1555 the Clerk of the Pells was given a suite of rooms in the East tower of Westminster Hall (which had previously served as chambers for the by-then defunct Court of First Fruits and Tenths).

The King's Remembrancer had his offices at the west end of the court building. Below were three prison cells (known as 'Hell', 'Purgatory' and 'Paradise'), which were later converted into Public Houses bearing the same names, before being turned over (in the reign of Henry VIII) to the storage of records. The records of the Exchequer were kept in what was known as the Pell Office, adjacent to Westminster Hall, until the 19th century. The office was named after the skins (then "pells" or pelts) from which the rolls were made.

The Court of Exchequer remained in its ancient premises until 1823, when the building was demolished to make way for Sir John Soane's new Law Courts complex (which provided new accommodation for the Courts of Exchequer and Exchequer Chamber, as well as for those courts hitherto housed within Westminster Hall itself).

== Other exchequers ==
=== Exchequer of Normandy ===
The operation of an exchequer in Normandy is documented as early as 1180. This exchequer had broader jurisdiction than the English exchequer, dealing in both fiscal and administrative matters. The Dialogue concerning the Exchequer presents it as a general belief that the Norman kings established the Exchequer in England on the loose model of the Norman exchequer, while noting with some doubt an alternative view that the Exchequer existed in Anglo-Saxon times. The specific chronology of the two exchequers' founding's remains unknown.

=== Exchequer of the Jews ===
From the late 1190s to the expulsion of the Jews in 1290, there was a separate division for taxation of Jews and the law-cases arising between Jews and Christians, called Exchequer of the Jews (Latin: Scaccarium Judaeorum).

=== Exchequer in Scotland ===
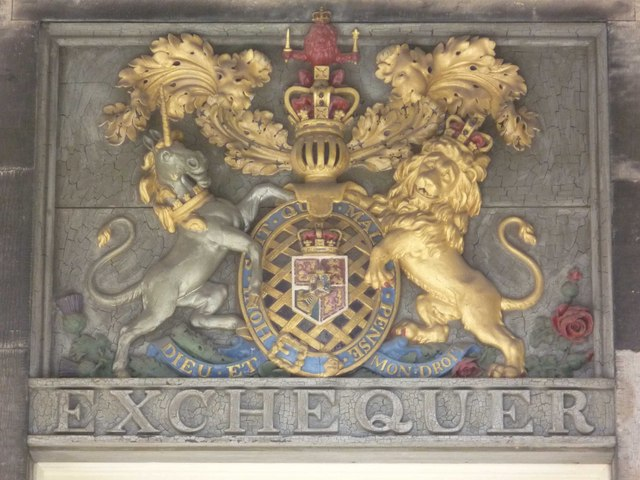
Royal Arms on the old Exchequer building in Parliament Square, Edinburgh.

The Scottish Exchequer dates to around 1200, with a similar role in auditing and royal revenues as in England. Receipt and issue of the revenue took place there and the Court of Exchequer controlled the accounts in the name of the Treasurer and Great Chamberlain.

The Scottish Exchequer was slower to develop a separate judicial role; and it was not until 1584 that it became a court of law, separate from the king's council. Even then, the judicial and the administrative roles were never completely separated as with the English Exchequer.

In 1707, the Exchequer Court (Scotland) Act 1707 (6 Ann. c. 53) reconstituted the Exchequer into a law court on the English model, with a lord chief baron and four barons. The court adopted English forms of procedure and had further powers added. This was done in Section 19 of the Act of Union 1707.

In 1832 all the Exchequer's duties and powers pertaining to revenue administration were transferred to HM Treasury. From 1832, no new barons were appointed; their role was increasingly assumed by judges of the Court of Session. By the Exchequer Court (Scotland) Act 1856 (19 & 20 Vict. c. 56), the Exchequer became a part of the Court of Session. A lord ordinary acts as a judge in Exchequer causes. The English forms of process ceased to be used in 1947.

=== Exchequer of Ireland ===
The Exchequer of Ireland developed in 1210 when King John of England reorganised the governance of his Lordship of Ireland and brought it more in line with English law. It consisted of the Superior Exchequer, a court of equity and revenue akin to the Exchequer of Pleas, and the Inferior Exchequer. The latter were the treasurers who handled all logistics from collecting the money (Teller or Cashier), logging it (Clerk of the Pells) and signing money orders accepting or paying money. It was managed by its own Chancellor of the Exchequer of Ireland and Chief Baron of the Irish Exchequer.

The Court of Exchequer existed from about 1299 to 1877. It was abolished under the Supreme Court of Judicature Act (Ireland) 1877 and was merged, along with the Court of King's Bench, the Court of Chancery and the Court of Common Pleas, into the new High Court of Justice in Ireland (now replaced by the High Court).

The Central Fund, the Republic of Ireland's equivalent of the UK's Consolidated Fund, is colloquially called the Exchequer when distinguished as a component of government funding.

=== Local exchequers ===
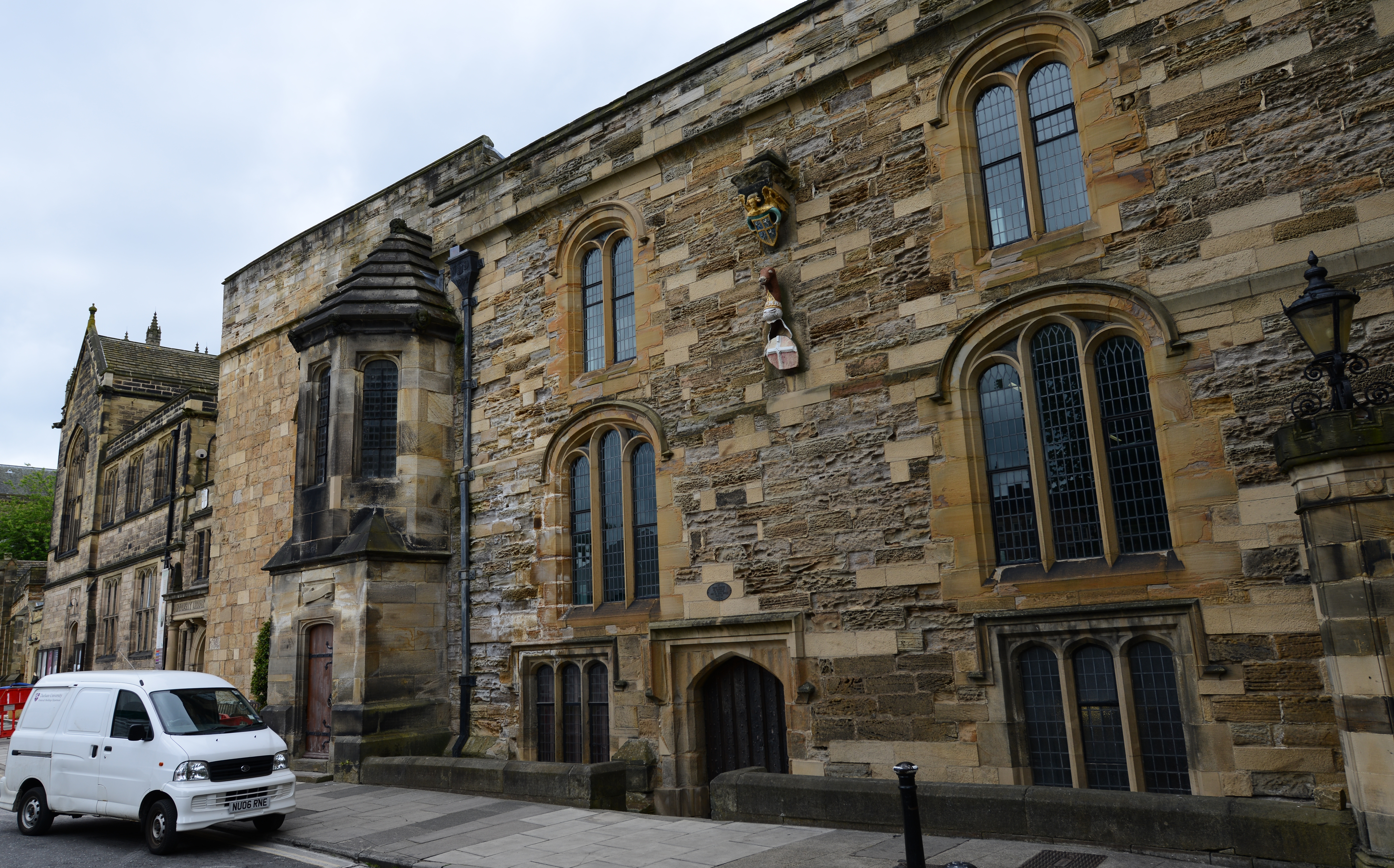
The old Exchequer building in Durham (dating from 1438).

As well as the principal Exchequer, which sat at Westminster (and occasionally elsewhere in earlier times), there are records of other exchequers operating in England and Wales (Madox describes them as 'inferior Receipts or Treasuries that were called by that Name'). There was one in the City of London at the Cambium (or Exchange), one in Caernarfon in North Wales, and others in Berwick upon Tweed, Carlisle, Chester and Durham. The Exchequer of Chester functioned as part of the administration of the County Palatine of Cheshire, the Exchequer of Durham serving likewise for the County Palatine of Durham. The Exchequer at Caernarfon was staffed in the 13th century by a Chamberlain and a Treasurer and (like its counterpart in London) issued Writs of Summons for monies owed to the king.

== See also ==
- Black Book of the Exchequer
- Exchequer of Chester
- Exchequer Standards
- Fisc
- History of the English fiscal system
- Red Book of the Exchequer
- Taxation in medieval England

== Bibliography ==
- Henderson, Ernest F., ed. (1896). "The Dialogue Concerning the Exchequer. circa 1180". Select Historical Documents of the Middle Ages. London: George Bell and Sons. Archived from the original on 8 February 2007.
- Johnson, Charles, ed. (1983). Dialogus de Scaccario: the Course of the Exchequer, by Richard, Fitz Nigel (PDF) (2nd ed.). Oxford: Clarendon Press.
- Anson, Sir William Reynell (1892). The Law and Custom of the Constitution, Part 2. Oxford, Oxfordshire: Clarendon Press. pp. 161–164.
- Brand, John David (1989). The Exchequer in the Later Twelfth Century (PDF). London: The Polytechnic of North London.
- Hall, Hubert (1898). The Antiquities and Curiosities of the Exchequer (PDF). London: Elliot Stock.
- Jenkinson, Hilary (1917). "Financial Records of the Reign of King John". In Malden, Henry Elliot (ed.). Magna Carta Commemoration Essays. London: Royal Historical Society. pp. 244–300.
- Keir, D. L. (1946). The Constitutional History of Modern Britain 1485–1937 (Third ed.). London: A & C Black.
- Madox, Thomas (1769a). The History and Antiquities of the Exchequer of the Kings of England (Volume I) (Second ed.). London: William Owen and Benjamin White.
- Madox, Thomas (1769b). The History and Antiquities of the Exchequer of the Kings of England (Volume II) (Second ed.). London: William Owen and Benjamin White.
- Murray, Athol L, Burnett, Charles J., The seals of the Exchequer of Scotland. Proc. Soc. Antiq. Scot. 123 (1993) 439–52
- Poole, Reginald (1912). The Exchequer in the Twelfth Century (PDF). Oxford: Clarendon Press.
- Price, George (1830). A Treatise on the law of the Exchequer. London: Saunders and Benning.
- Sainty, J. C. (1983). No. 18: Officers of the Exchequer. London: List and Index Society Publications.
- Spring-Rice, Stephen Edward (1911). "Exchequer" . In Chisholm, Hugh (ed.). Encyclopædia Britannica. Vol. 10 (11th ed.). Cambridge University Press. pp. 54–58.
- Steel, Anthony The Receipt of the Exchequer, 1377–1485. Cambridge: Cambridge University Press, 1954.
- Thomas, Francis Sheppard (1848). The Ancient Exchequer of England; the Treasury; and Origin of the Present Management of the Exchequer and Treasury of Ireland. J. Petheram. OCLC 465938569.
- Warren, W. L., The Governance of Norman and Angevin England 1086–1272. Edward Arnold, 1987. ISBN 0-7131-6378-X
- National Archives of Scotland guide to Exchequer Records. nas.gov.uk
