= Exchequer Standards =

Official English unit standards

The Exchequer Standards may refer to the set of official English standards for weights and measures created by Queen Elizabeth I (English units), and in effect from 1588 to 1825, when the Imperial units system took effect, or to the whole range of English unit standards maintained by the Court of the Exchequer from the 1200s, or to the physical reference standards physically kept at the Exchequer and used as the legal reference until the such responsibility was transferred in the 1860s, after the Imperial system had been established.

The Exchequer standards made in the reign of Queen Elizabeth were not authorized by any statute. The standards were ordered by the royal authority, as appears from a roll of Michaelmas terms in the 29th Elizabeth, preserved in the Queen's Remembrancer's Office, and containing the royal proclamation.

The Exchequer Standards were so called because their repository had always been the Court of the King's Exchequer.

Notably, Elizabeth I's redefinition of these standards instituted the English Doubling System, whereby each larger liquid measure equals exactly two of the next-smaller measure.

== Historical development ==
=== 1225–1265 The Great Charter (9 Hen. 3.) ===
The Great Charter of 1225 was the first legislative act in the English Statutes at Large, and is a repetition of Magna Carta by Henry III in 1300, although it is officially listed as act 9 Hen. 3.

With respect to Magna Carta requiring that there be one unified measure of volume, and another for length, thus unifying disparate measurement systems used to trade each different commodity, there is an argument made that this supposition is in error, and that it actually required these remain separately defined measures, but each be consistent across the kingdom:

In several of the subsequent confirmations of this charter, which, for successive ages, attest at once how apt it was to be forgotten by power, and how present it always was to the memory of the people, the real meaning of this 25th chapter appears to have been misunderstood. It has been supposed to have prescribed the uniformity of identity, and not the uniformity of proportion; that, by enjoining one measure of wine, and one measure of ale, and one measure of corn, its intention was, that all these measures should be the same; that there should be only one unit measure of capacity for liquid and dry substance, and one unit of weights.

But this neither was, nor could be, the meaning of the statute. Had it been the intention of the legislator, he would have said, there shall be one and the same measure for wine, corn, and ale; and the reference to the London quarter could not have been made, for neither wine nor ale were ever measured by the quarter, and, instead of saying "it shall be of weights as it is of measures," it would have said there shall be but one set of weights for whatever is to be weighed.

The object of the whole statute was, not to innovate, but to fix existing rights and usages, and to guard against fraud and oppression. It says that the measure of corn shall be the London quarter; the cloth shall be two yards within the lists. But it neither defines the contents of the quarter, nor the length of the yard; it refers to both as fixed and settled quantities. To have prescribed that there should be but one unit of weights and one measure of wine, ale, and corn, would have been a great and violent innovation upon all the existing habits and usages of the people. The chapter is not intended for a general regulation of weights and measures. It refers specifically and exclusively to the measure of three articles, wine, ale, corn; and to the width of cloths. Its intention was to provide that the measure of corn, of ale, and of wine, should not be the same; that is, that the wine measure should not be used for ale and corn, nor the ale measure for wine.

That such was and must have been the meaning of the statute, is further proved by the statute of 1266, (51 Hen. 3.) and by the treatise upon weights and measures, published in the statute books as of the 31 Edw. 1., or 1304; the first, and act of the same Henry the Third whose Great Charter is that inserted among the laws, and the second an act of the same Edward the First whose confirmation of the Great Charter is the existing statute.

— John Quincy Adams, "Report upon weights and measures"

The Rumford corn gallon of 1228, examined by the committee of the House of Commons in 1758, was found to be 266.25 cubic inches.

==== Corn ====
- The quarter of London

==== Ale ====
- The Ale gallon: of the same contents for liquid measure as the half peck was for dry

==== Wine ====
- One measure of wine was a gallon, not of the same cubical contents as the half-peck and ale gallon, but which, when filled with wine, was of the same weight as the half-peck, or corn gallon, when filled with wheat.

==== Cloth ====
- One breadth of cloth: two yards (ulna) within the lists

=== 1266–1304 (51 Hen. 3.) Assize of bread and or ale ===
According to Secretary Adams,

It presents an established scale, then of ancient standing, between the prices of wheat and of bread, providing that when the quarter of wheat is sold at twelve pence, the farthing loaf of the best white bread shall weigh six pounds sixteen shillings. It then graduates the weight of bread according to the price of wheat, and for every six pence added to the quarter of wheat, reduces, though not in exact proportions, the weight of the farthing loaf, till, when the wheat is ta twenty shillings a quarter, it directs the weight of the loaf to be six shillings and three pence. It regulates in like manner, the price of the gallon of ale, by the price of wheat, barley, and oats; and finally, declares that, "by the consent of the whole realm of England, the measure of the king was made; that is to say: that an English penny, called a sterling round, and without any clipping, shall weigh thirty-two wheat corns in the midst of the ear, and twenty-pence do make an ounce, and twelve ounces one pound, and eight pound do make a gallon of wine, and eight gallons of wine do make a London bushel, which is the eighth part of a quarter."

Adams goes on to say (paraphrased and simplified):

- The act noted that thirty-two kernels of average wheat from the middle of the ear were equal in weight to the silver penny sterling, new from the mint, round and without clipping—22.5 Troy grains.
- It then defined that twenty such pence equal an ounce.
- It then defined that twelve ounces equal one pound (sterling?), which Mr. Adams stated was 5,400 Troy grains.
- It then defined that eight pounds (of fifteen ounces or 6,750 Troy grains; the commercial pound) equal a gallon of Gascoign wine, which was used to define the standard bushel. This wine was later called Claret or Bordeaux, and its specific gravity as compared with distilled water was 9,935 to 10,000, and weighed 250 troy grains per cubic inch. Mr. Adams continues his calculation to state that these eight pounds weighed 54,000 Troy grains, which divided by 250 gives a wine gallon of 216 cubic inches, which is very close to the Irish wine gallon (217.6 cubic inches) in effect in 1817. Yet when calculated based on the definition of the 63-gallon hogshead, Mr. Adams calculates the wine gallon to be 219.43 cubic inches.
- It then defined that there are eight bushels in a quarter (by weight, not volume). So a bushel, filled with wheat, would exactly balance a keg containing eight gallons of wine, deducting the tare of both vessels.
- Also, one eighth of this bushel, by volume, would be a vessel and called the ale gallon.

Thus, the key to the whole measurement system of 1266 was the weight of the silver penny sterling. This penny was 1/240th of the Tower pound, which had been used at the London mint for centuries before the Norman conquest, and which continued as legal tender until 1527, when Henry VIII replaced it with the Troy pound. The Tower pound weighed 3/4 Troy ounce less than the Troy pound (15/16th of the Troy pound). Its penny, therefore weighed 22.5 Troy grains.

There was also another pound used c. 1266; the commercial pound, which equaled fifteen ounces and was used to measure wine and most other items of commerce.

=== 1304–1494 (31 Edw. 1.?) ===
At this point, there is not yet any mention of the avoirdupois or troy weights.

=== 1494–1496 (10 Hen. 7.) ===
King Henry VII had 43 copies of the Exchequer standards made and distributed to the principal cities of the kingdom, but these were later found to be defective, and remade in 1496.

=== 1496– (12 Hen. 7.) ===
The Weights and Measures Act 1496 (12 Hen. 7. c. 5) redefined the volumetric measures based on the Troy weights, officially discarding (though perhaps not on purpose) the Tower pound and the commercial pound for defining all measures:

"The measure of a bushel contain eight gallons of wheat, that every gallon contain eight pounds of wheat, troy weight, and every pound contain twelve ounces of troy weight, and every ounce contain twenty sterlings, and every sterling be of the weight of thirty-two corns of wheat that grew in the midst of the ear of wheat, according to the old laws of the land."

Mr. Adams explains that this act of 1496 made several errors including inverting the order of the old statutes, assuming that the penny sterling, described in the acts of 1266 and 1304 was the penny weight troy (which it was not because the coinage had been adjusted since), and a belief that it was the measure, and not the weight, of eight gallons of wine, which constituted the bushel. It is here that the Guildhall gallon of 224 cubic inches is created. The same act creates the gallon of 231 cubic inches,

=== 1428 2 Hen. 6. c. 2 ===
King Henry VI decreed the following, which adjusted the sizes of casks

"in old time it was ordained, and lawfully used, that tuns, pipes, tertians, hogsheads, of Gascoigne wine, barrels of herring and of eels, and butts of salmon, coming by way of merchandise into the land, out of strange countries, and also made in the same land, should be of certain measure; that is to say: the tun of wine 252 gallons, the pipe 126 gallons, the tertian 84 gallons, the hogshead 63 gallons, the barrel of herring and of eels 30 gallons, fully packed, the butt of salmon 84 gallons, fully packed, &c.; but that of late, by device and subtlety, such vessels have been of much less measure, to the great deceit and loss of the king and his people, whereof special remedy was prayed in the parliament."

== Competing systems ==
By 1862, there were multiple competing and confusing systems of measurement in the United Kingdom, and suggestions for simplification and possibly even switching to the French Metric system.

=== Systems of length ===
- inch
- foot
- yard
  - mile (English: 1,760 yards; Scotch: 1,977 yards; Irish: 2,240 yards)
- Nautical
  - fathoms (man-of-war: 6 feet; merchant vessel: 5.5 feet; fishing smack: 5 feet)
  - knots
  - leagues
  - geographical mile: 1 1/7th mile
- Surveyors' measures:
  - links
  - chains
  - rods
  - poles
  - perches

=== Systems of area ===
- land
  - acre (several in England, including Falmouth: 4,840 square yards; Preston: 10,240; elsewhere 9,000)
  - rood (several in England)
  - Scotch acre
  - Irish acre
- Cloth
  - yards
  - nails
  - ells (four different sorts)

=== Systems of weight ===
- Grains, computed decimally, used for scientific purposes.
- Troy weight, under 5 Geo. 4. c. 74, and 18 & 19 Vict. c. 72.
- Troy ounce, with decimal multiples and divisions, called bullion weights, under 16 & 17 Vict. c. 29.
- Banker's weights, to weigh 10, 20, 30, 50, 100, and 200 sovereigns.
- Apothecaries weight.
- Diamond weights and pearl weights, including carats.
- Avoirdupois weight, under 5 Geo. 4. c. 74, and 18 & 19 Vict. c. 72.
- Weights for hay and straw.
- Wool weight, using as factors 2, 3, 7, 13, and their multiples.
- Coal weights, decimal, under 1 & 2 Will. 4. c. 76, and 8 & 9 Vict. c. 101, Nos. 1, .5, .2, .1, .05, .025.
- stone (about 10 different definitions)
- hundredweight (100lbs, 112lbs, or 120lbs)
- pound (Dutch, troy, or avoirdupois)

=== Systems of volume ===
- Bushels (27 different ones, including 168 lbs., 73lbs., 80lbs., 60lbs., 70lbs., 63lbs, and so on)
- Hoghead (ale: 54 gallons; wine: 63 gallons)
- pipe of wine (port: 103 gallons; Teneriffe: 100 gallons; Madeira 92 gallons; Marsala 93 gallons)
- cubic inches

== Modifications ==
- Addition of the Queen Anne Wine Gallon in 1707 (6 Ann. c. 27. s. 17.)

== Definitions ==
- 23 Eliz. 1. c. 8 (1591)
- 35 Eliz. 1. c. 6 (1593)
- 35 Eliz. 1. c. 10. par. III (1593)

== See also ==
- English units
- Winchester measure
- Imperial units
