= Estreature =

Estreature is the action and change of status involved in converting a surety bond asset forfeiture into a civil action.

== See also ==
- Estreat
