= Nail (unit) =

Unit of cloth measurement

A nail, as a unit of cloth measurement, is generally a sixteenth of a yard or 21/4 inches (5.715 cm). The nail was apparently named after the practice of hammering brass nails into the counter at shops where cloth was sold. On the other hand, R D Connor, in The weights and measures of England (p 84) states that the nail was the 16th part of a Roman foot, i.e., digitus or finger, although he provides no reference to support this. Zupko's A dictionary of weights and measures for the British Isles (p 256) states that the nail was originally the distance from the thumbnail to the joint at the base of the thumb, or alternately, from the end of the middle finger to the second joint.

An archaic usage of the term nail is as a sixteenth of a (long) hundredweight for mass, or 1 clove of 7 pound avoirdupois (3.175 kg).

== The nail in literature ==
Oh, monstrous arrogance! Thou liest, thou thread,

Thou yard, three-quarters, half-yard, quarter, nail
Thou flea, thou nit, thou winter cricket thou:―
Brav'd in mine own house with a skein of

thread!

— Petruchio, Act. IV, Scene 3, The Taming of the Shrew, Shakespeare

Explanation: Katherine and Petruchio are purchasing new clothes for Bianca's wedding. Petruchio is concerned that Katharine's dress has too many frills, wonders what it will cost, and suspects that he has been cheated. Katherine says she likes it, and complains that Petruchio is making a fool of her. The tailor repeats Katherine's words: Sir, she says you're making a fool of her. Petruchio then launches into the above-quoted tirade. Monstrous may be a double-entendre for cuckold. The half-yard, quarter and nail were divisions of the yard used in cloth measurement.

== The nail in law ==
VI. For reformation whereof, be it enacted That from and after the first day of April next coming every of the said cottons being sufficiently milled or thicked, clean scoured, well wrought and fully dried, shall weigh twenty-one pounds at the least and shall contain in length twenty-one goads, or twenty-goads at the least, and in breadth at the most three quarters of the yard, or within one nail of three quarters of the yard at the least: (2) And that every of the said frizes or rugs being thicked and fully dried shall weigh forty-four pounds at the least and shall contain in length betwixt thirty five-yards and thirty-seven yards, and shall contain in breadth at the most three quarters of the yard, or within one nail of three quarters at the least, and not to be strained upon the tentors above one nail in breadth.

— 8 Elizabeth 12 (1565) An act for the aulnegers fees in Lancaster, and for length, breadth and weight of cottons, frizes and rugs.

I. ...shall be made full Yard and Nail, or full Three Quarters of a Yard and Nail, that when whitened it may be full Yard or full Three Quarters of a Yard in Breadth...
II. ...for every Half a Quarter the Three Quarters Yard and Nail plain Cloth shall exceed the said Breadths, shall forfeit the Sum of for Five Shillings Sterling...

— 10 Anne 21 (1711) An Act to prevent Abuses in making Linen Cloth, and regulating the Lengths, Breadths and equal sorting of Yarn, for each Piece made in Scotland, and for whitening the same.
