= Estreat =

Estreat (French: estrait, Latin: extracta) means, originally, a true copy or duplicate of some original writing or record; since the 1900s used only with reference to the enforcement of a forfeited recognizance.

At one time it was the practice to extract and certify into the exchequer copies of entries in manorial rolls which contained provision or orders in favour of the treasury, hence the estreating of a recognizance was the taking out from among the other records of the court in which it was filed and sending it to the exchequer to be enforced, or sending it to the sheriff to be levied by him, and then returned by the clerk of the peace to the lords of the treasury.

== See also ==
- Estreature
