= Sarpler =

British weight for wool

Sarpler, Sarplier or (in Scotland) Serplathe was a UK weight for wool.

== Definitions ==
The Oxford English Dictionary defines a sarpler as 80 tods, where a tod is usually 28lbs thus usually 80 x 28 lbs, or 160 stone, = 2,240 pounds (1,020 kg)

Another definition, half the quantity, is given by Cowell's 1607 book (fourscore=80, 80 stone = 80 x 14lbs = 1,120 pounds (510 kg):

Sarpler is a quantitie of woll. This in Scotland is called Serplathe, and conteineth fourscore stone ...

A different and apparently arithmetically confused definition is given in The Life and Works of Arthur Hall of Grantham, where he states:

In a sarpler of wool is thre sacks, in everye sacke 26 stone at 14 pounde the stone, whiche makes 264 lbs., so as there is in a sarpler of wool 78 stone and 792 lbs.

The compendium Sizes Inc offers a range of inconsistent historic definitions, most of which agree that the term had gone out of use, but suggests that:

In the late 19th century, the sarpler begins to be defined as a long ton (2240 pounds of wool). This value may also be an error, in this case arising from a mistaken substitution of the tod for the stone.
