= Exchequer of Chester =

The Exchequer of Chester was a fiscal court based in the County Palatine of Chester. In 1071 the Earldom of Chester was created, and due to the Earldom's size it ruled Chester almost entirely independently as a County Palatine. This arrangement necessitated a large number of officials, including several "barons" who specialised in the financial administration of the county. These gradually became a fiscal court, made up of the "Barons of the Exchequer", in a similar arrangement to that at Westminster. The earliest records of this organisation come from 1121, when the Earl granted various charters to Chester Abbey. The Exchequer continued working after The Crown took over the County in 1237, mainly concerning itself with collecting the rent from local tenants. The Exchequer's supreme jurisdiction over Chester was confirmed by the Court of Common Pleas in 1568, and it continued operating until 1830, when it was abolished and its powers transferred to the Exchequer and Court of Chancery.

== Bibliography ==
- Stewart-Brown, R. (1942). "The Exchequer of Chester". The English Historical Review. 57 (227). Oxford University Press. ISSN 0013-8266.
