= Skien =

Skien may refer to:

== Places ==
- Skien (town), a town within Skien Municipality in Telemark county, Norway
- Skien Municipality, a municipality in Telemark county, Norway
- Skien watershed, the third largest watershed of Norway
- Skien prosti, a subdivision of the Church of Norway in Telemark county, Norway
- Skien Church, a church in Skien Municipality in Telemark county, Norway

== Transport ==
- Skien Station, a railway station in Skien Municipality in Telemark county, Norway
- Skien Airport, Geiteryggen, an airport in Skien Municipality in Telemark county, Norway

== Sport ==
- Skien Fritidspark, a multi-purpose stadium located in Skien, Norway
- Skiens BK, a Norwegian team handball club based in Skien, Norway
- Skien IK, an ice hockey team based in Skien, Norway
- IF Skiens Grane, a Norwegian association football club from west central Skien
