= Ronald Edward Zupko =

American metrologist and academic

- Born: 5 August 1938; Youngstown, Ohio
- Died: 8 November 2021 (aged 83); Wauwatosa, Wisconsin
- Known for: Historical Metrology

Academic background
- Education: University of Wisconsin-Madison

Ronald Edward Zupko (5 August 1938 – 8 November 2021) was an authority on historical metrology (the study of the history of weights and measures) with an academic background in medieval history. He was known for his books on the history of weights and measures, and had written numerous dictionary and encyclopedia entries on historical measurement units.

Born in Youngstown, Ohio, Zupko received his Ph.D. from the University of Wisconsin–Madison and taught at Marquette University from 1966 until retiring in 2002.

Professor Zupko was a member of the Comité International pour la Métrologie Historique, Institute for Advanced Study (associate member), Mediaeval Academy of America, Economic History Association, National Association of Watch and Clock Collectors, Midwest Medieval Association, Pi Gamma Mu, and Phi Alpha Theta.

== Published works ==
British Weights and Measures: A History from Antiquity to the Seventeenth Century
hardcover: 224 pages, University of Wisconsin Press (1977), ISBN 978-0-299-07340-4

French Weights and Measures Before the Revolution: A Dictionary of Provincial and Local Units
hardcover: 256 pages, Indiana University Press (1979) ISBN 978-0-253-32480-1

Italian Weights and Measures from the Middle Ages to the Nineteenth Century
hardcover: 339 pages, American Philosophical Society (1981) ISBN 978-0-87169-145-3

Dictionary of Weights and Measures for the British Isles: The Middle Ages to the 20th Century
hardcover, 520 pages, American Philosophical Society (1985) ISBN 978-0-87169-168-2

Revolution in Measurement: Western European Weights and Measures Since the Age of Science
hardcover: 548 pages, American Philosophical Society (1990) ISBN 978-0-87169-186-6

Straws In The Wind: Medieval Urban Environmental Law--the Case Of Northern Italy
co-authored with Robert A Laures
paperback: 160 pages, Westview Press (1996) ISBN 978-0-8133-2972-7

== Bibliography ==
Contemporary Authors, vol. 13 (1984)
