= Skein (unit) =

Unit of length equal to 360 feet (109.73 m)

A skein is a unit of length which has been used in the UK. As a measuring unit of cotton yarn or of silk, a skein equates to a "rap" or a "lea". One skein is equivalent to 360 feet (109.73 m).
