= Alcohol measurements =

Units of measure for alcoholic drinks

Alcohol measurements are units of measurement for determining amounts of beverage alcohol. Alcohol concentration in beverages is commonly expressed as alcohol by volume (ABV), ranging from less than 0.1% in fruit juices to up to 98% in rare cases of spirits. A "standard drink" is used globally to quantify alcohol intake, though its definition varies widely by country. Serving sizes of alcoholic beverages also vary by country.

== Alcohol concentration ==
Typical ABV ranges
Fruit juices	< 0.1%
Cider, wine coolers	4%–8%
Beers	typically 5% (range is from 3–15%)
Wines	typically 13.5% (range is from 8%–17%)
Sakes	15–16%
Fortified wines	15–22%
Spirits	typically 30%-40% (range is from 15% to, in some rare cases, up to 98%)

The concentration of alcohol in a beverage is usually stated as the percentage of alcohol by volume (ABV, the number of milliliters (ml) of pure ethanol in 100 ml of beverage) or as proof. In the United States, proof is twice the percentage of alcohol by volume at 60 degrees Fahrenheit (e.g. 80 proof = 40% ABV). Degrees proof were formerly used in the United Kingdom, where 100 degrees proof was equivalent to 57.1% ABV. Historically, this was the most dilute spirit that would sustain the combustion of gunpowder.

Ordinary distillation cannot produce alcohol of more than 95.6% by weight, which is about 97.2% ABV (194.4 proof) because at that point alcohol is an azeotrope with water. A spirit which contains a very high level of alcohol and does not contain any added flavoring is commonly called a neutral spirit. Generally, any distilled alcoholic beverage of 170 US proof or higher is considered to be a neutral spirit.

Most yeasts cannot reproduce when the concentration of alcohol is higher than about 18%, so that is the practical limit for the strength of fermented drinks such as wine, beer, and sake. However, some strains of yeast have been developed that can reproduce in solutions of up to 25% ABV.

== Standard drink ==
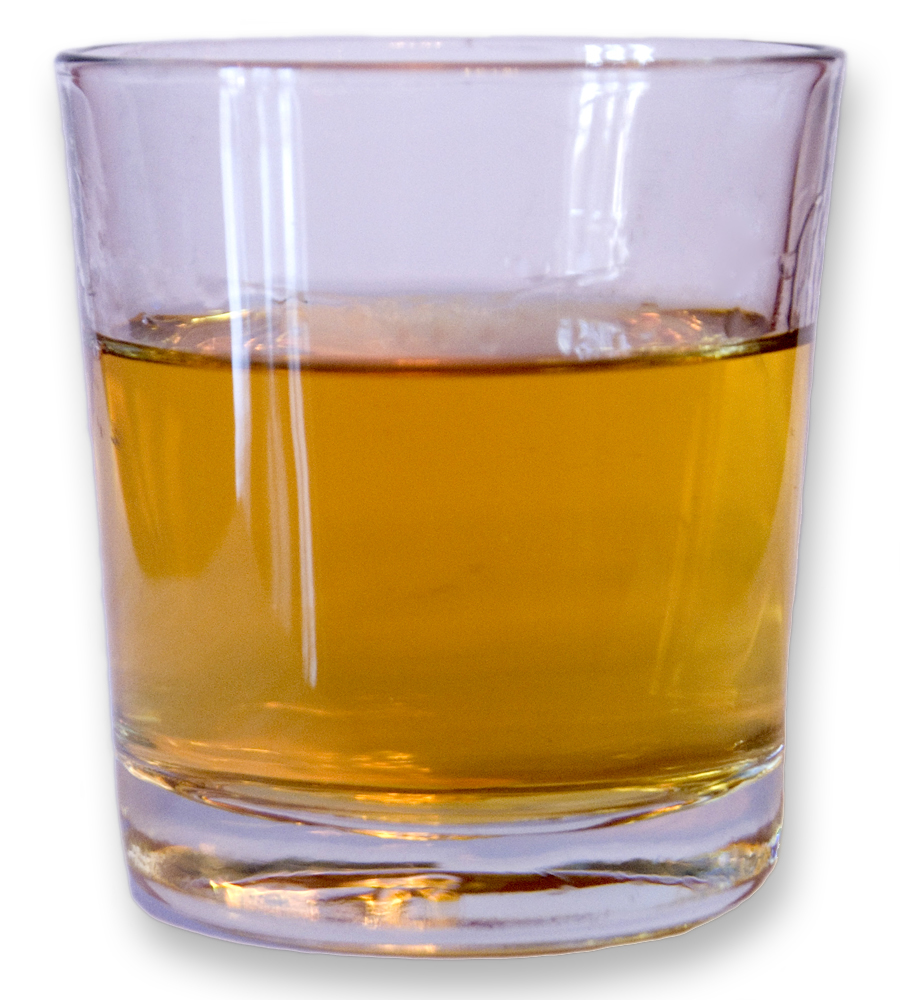
A "standard drink" of hard liquor does not necessarily reflect a typical serving size, such as seen here.

A standard drink is a notional drink that contains a specified amount of pure alcohol. The standard drink is used in many countries to quantify alcohol intake. It is usually expressed as a measure of beer, wine, or spirits. One standard drink always contains the same amount of alcohol regardless of serving size or the type of alcoholic beverage. The standard drink varies significantly from country to country. For example, it is 7.62 ml (6 grams) of alcohol in Austria, but in Japan it is 25 ml (19.75 grams):

- In the United Kingdom, there is a system of units of alcohol which serves as a guideline for alcohol consumption. A single unit of alcohol is defined as 10 mL of pure alcohol, and the number of units present in a typical drink is sometimes printed on bottles. The system is intended as an aid to people who are regulating the amount of alcohol they drink; it is not used to determine serving sizes.
- In the United States, the standard drink contains 0.6 US fluid ounces (18 ml) of alcohol. This is approximately the amount of alcohol in a 12-US-fluid-ounce (350 ml) glass of beer, a 5-US-fluid-ounce (150 ml) glass of wine, or a 1.5-US-fluid-ounce (44 ml) glass of a 40% ABV (80 US proof) spirit.

A standard drink of 10g alcohol is used in the WHO AUDIT (Alcohol Use Disorders Identification Test)'s questionnaire form example, and has been adopted by more countries than any other amount. 10 grams is equivalent to 12.7 millilitres.

== Beer measures ==
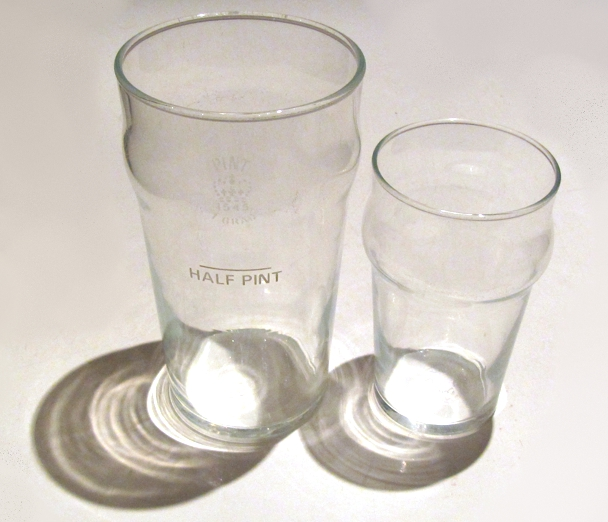
Full and half pint beer glasses

Name	Metric units (approx.)	US customary units	Imperial units	Notes
Gill (Imp)	142 mL	4.8 US fl oz	5 imp oz	1/4 of an Imperial pint. Also called a Quartern or Noggin. (Note: The Gill was one of the drinking vessel measures of volume (along with the Chopine and Cipha) banned by the City of London in 1310)
Nip (UK)	189.42 mL	6.39 US fl oz	6 2/3 imp oz	1/3 of an Imperial pint. Short for Nipperkin. Strong ale and Barley wine were usually bottled in nips Metric measurement glasses and containers usually round up to a metric half pint of 200 mL (7 imp oz).
small glass (US)	236.59 mL	8 US fl oz	8.33 imp oz	1/2 US pint.
small glass (EU)	275 mL	9.29 US fl oz	9.68 imp oz	
Gill of Beer (UK)	284 mL	9.61 US fl oz	10 imp oz	1/2 Imperial pint. A gill of beer was a customary measure equal to half an imperial pint (10 imperial fluid ounces or 280 millilitres) used in rural parts of England. It is a holdover from when spirits, wines and brandies, ale, and beer all had different standard measures of capacity. An Ale Gill (based on the Ale gallon) and a Beer Gill (based on the Beer gallon) were different sizes until standardized as Ale / Beer gallons in 1688, Beer gallons in 1803, and Imperial gallons in 1824.
Half (imp.)	284 mL	9.61 US fl oz	10 imp oz	1/2 Imperial pint. Also called a "glass" in the UK and Ireland. Metric-measure glasses round down to 280 mL or round up to 285 mL.
bottle (EU)	330 mL	11.16 US fl oz	11.61 imp oz	The Standard International Bottle. 1/3 litre, based on the long-necked 355 mL American standard bottle.
Stubby (imp.)	341 mL	11.53 US fl oz	12 imp oz	3/5 of an imperial pint. A short-necked, thick-walled beer bottle commonly found in Canada and South Africa. It was rounded down to 340 mL after metrication, and later replaced by the EU standard long-necked 330 mL bottle.
bottle (US)	355 mL	12 US fl oz	12.49 imp oz	3/4 US pint. American breweries fluctuated between 11 and 13 ounces before gradually standardizing on a median 12 ounces after World War II. The American Twelfth (10 2/3 US oz [315 mL], or 1/12 of a US gallon), American Commercial Pint (12.8 US fl oz [379 mL], or 1/10 of a US gallon) / British Reputed Pint (13 1/3 imp oz [379 mL], or 1/12 an Imperial gallon), and the Canadian "stubby" bottle (12 imp oz [341 mL]) may have been factors.
Stubbie (AUS)	375 mL	12.68 US fl oz	13.2 imp oz	A beer bottle that is half the capacity of a 750 mL champagne/wine bottle. Reused champagne punts were used in the 19th century to ship lager beer to Australia, establishing it as the beer "quart". When metrication was introduced in the 1970s, the Reputed Pint (13 1/3 imp oz [379 mL]) was replaced with the 375 mL stubbie.
Schooner (UK)	378.84 mL	12.8 US fl oz	13 1/3 imp oz	2/3 of an imperial pint. Metric measurement glasses usually round up to 380 mL (13.37 imp oz).
Schooner (AUS)	425 mL	14.37 US fl oz	14.95 imp oz	3/4 of an Imperial pint; a schooner is an imperial half pint [285 mL] in South Australia.
pint (US) / large glass (US)	473.18 mL	1 US pt = 16 US fl oz	16.65 imp oz	1 US pint.
pint (imp.)	568.26 mL	19.2 US fl oz	1 imp. pt = 20 imp oz	Beer sales in Britain and the Commonwealth are based on multiples of 1/3, 1/2, and full imperial pints. (Note: Originally beer in Britain was sold by the quart, but has been set by the pint since An Act for the ascertaining the Measures for retailing Ale and Beer of 1698. This set the standard measure based on the Ale Pint or Ale Quart.) Imperial-measure glasses were 568 mL, and metric-measure glasses round up to 570 mL. Beer bottles in the UK were rounded down to 550 mL after standard metrication was introduced in 1995, later changed to 500 mL by January 1, 2000. After December 31, 1999, the imperial pint was no longer considered a legal measure except for draught beer, cider, and milk in reusable pint and quart bottles.
Sixth (US)	651 mL	22 US fl oz	1.14 imp pt	1/6 US gallon, rounded up from 21.3 US fl oz. Also called a "bomber" or a "double deuce" (from the two #2s, or "deuces", in its volume). Mostly replaced by the 40 US fl oz bottle by the late 1980s, but still used by some breweries for beer and malt liquor. Metric measure containers are rounded down to 650 mL. The US 23-ounce beer glass holds a sixth of beer, plus the head.
tallboy	710 mL	24 US fl oz	1.249 imp pt	A beercan containing 3/4 of a US fluid quart. Also called a "7-10" in Canada.
flagon (US)	946.35 mL	32 US fl oz	1.66 imp pt	1 US quart.
small pitcher (US)	946.35 mL	32 US fl oz	1.66 imp pt	2 US pints. The 32 oz pitcher is usually used with large 16 oz beer glasses (2 glasses per pitcher).
40 (Imp.)	1.137 L		40 imp oz	2 imperial pints, 1 imperial quart, or a quarter of an imperial gallon. Referred to as a "40" or “40-pounder” in Canada (as in 40 Imperial ounces; also used for spirits) and a litre in the United States.
40 (US)	1.183 L	40 US fl oz	2.08 imp pt	2.5 US liquid pints. Might have been inspired by the Canadian 40 imp fl oz bottle. Malt liquor is often bottled in "40's".
Third (US)	1.242 L	42 US fl oz		1/3 US gallon. Mostly replaced by the 40 US fl oz bottle by the late 1980s.
medium pitcher (US)	1.41 L	48 US fl oz		3 US pints. The 48 oz pitcher is used with either medium 12 oz beer glasses (4 glasses per pitcher) or large 16 oz beer glasses (3 glasses per pitcher).
Yard of Ale (UK)	1.42 L	48.03 US fl oz	50 imp. oz	2 1/2 imp. Pints. A long thin vessel with a conical rim and a bulb-shaped reservoir at the bottom.
large pitcher (US)	1.77 L	60 US fl oz		3.75 US pints. The 60 oz pitcher is usually used with medium 12 oz beer glasses (5 glasses per pitcher).
growler	1.89 L	64 US fl oz		1/2 US gallon.
Darwin stubby	2.273 L		80 imp fl oz	Standard Australian bottle size, equal to half of an Imperial gallon. Later rounded down to 2.25 L (79.18 imp fl oz) after metrication, or reduced to 2 L (70.39 imp fl oz) in states with strict drinking laws.
bucket (UK)	18.18 L		4 imp gal	Obsolete measure.
pin	20.46 L		4.5 imp gal	
Sixtel Keg	19.53 L	5.16 US gal.		Sixth of a US beer barrel.
pony keg	29.33 L	7.75 US gal		1/4 US beer barrel.
anker (US)	37.85 L	10 US gal	8.33 imp gal	An obsolete Dutch measurement, originally used for a small cask of wine or brandy. It was brought to the New World by the former Dutch colony of Nieuw Amsterdam (renamed to New York City by the English in 1664). It was adopted by Colonial New York and New Jersey as a standard measure and was retained by America after independence. It was also used in Europe, where it varied in capacity from 9 to 11 US gallons.
firkin	40.91 L		9 imp gal	2 pins
keg	58.67 L	15.5 US gal		1/2 US beer barrel.
kilderkin	81.83 L		18 imp gal	2 firkins
US barrel	117.35 L	31 US gal		2 kegs
UK barrel	163.66 L		36 imp gal	2 kilderkins
hogshead	245.49 L		54 imp gal	6 firkins or 3 kilderkins
puncheon	327.32 L		72 imp gal	2 barrels
butt	490.98 L		108 imp gal	2 hogsheads or 3 barrels
tun	981.96 L		216 imp gal	2 butts or 3 puncheons.

== Liquor measurements ==
The following table lists common sizes for liquors and spirits.

Name	US customary units	Imperial units	English units	Metric units (direct conversion)	Metric units (legal/convention)	Notes
Bartender's Teaspoon (U.S.) or Splash	1/8 fl oz			3.67mL	3.7mL	1 dram
Bartender's Tablespoon (U.S.)	3/8 US fl oz			11.09mL	11.1mL	3 drams
Count	0.5 US fl oz			14.78mL	15mL	Using calibrated pour spouts that restrict flow to 0.5 fl oz/s
Mouthful (UK)			1/2 Wine oz.	14.78mL	15mL	1/32 of a wine pint, obsolete with the introduction of Imperial measures in 1824.
1/6 Gill (Imp.)		5/6 imp fl oz		23.67mL	25mL	Legal serving of spirits (gin, rum, vodka and whisky) defined in the Weights and Measures Act of 1963 (1963-1984). Rounded up to 25 mL in 1985. Scotland and Northern Ireland (and British premises grandfathered in before the act was enforced) were allowed to keep their larger measures, as long as the glassware was consistent and marked and advertised as such.
Pony (Eng.)	0.75 US fl. oz.	0.78 imp. fl. oz.	3/4 Wine oz.	22.18mL	25mL	(6 drams) May be derived from holding a "pennyworth" of beer.
Shot (UK)				25mL or 35mL	25mL or 35mL	Legal serving of spirits (gin, rum, vodka and whisky) in the UK since 1985.
Roquille (France)				29.75mL	~29.75mL	A measure of spirits in the Ancien Régime of France (before 1795), being 1/32 of a French pinte (~952.1 mL).
1/5 Gill (Scottish)		1 imp fl oz		28.41mL	30mL	Traditional Scottish spirits measure
Peg (India)		1 imp fl oz		28.41mL	30mL	Also called a "small peg"; a "large peg" is a double measure of 2 imperial ounces (60 mL). Traditional spirits measure on the Indian subcontinent.
Pony (U.S.)	1.0 US fl oz			29.57mL	30mL	Defined as 1/2 of a jigger. Was used to measure a cordial.
1/4 Gill (Irish)		1 1/4 imp fl oz		35.52mL	35mL	Traditional Irish spirits measure
Jigger (Imp.)		1/4 gill		35.52mL	35mL	Legal U.K. spirits measure from 1826 to 1984, for Gin, rum, vodka and whisky.
Jigger (Eng.)			1.5 imp fl oz	42.61mL	42mL	3 Tablespoons or 2 Ponies.
Jigger (U.S.)	1.5 US fl oz			44.36mL	45mL	Typical size after U.S. Prohibition, but varies
Short shot (U.S.)	1.5 US fl oz			44.36mL	45mL	
Double (UK)				50mL	50mL	Often drinks such as Baileys are sold only in this measure
Jigger (U.S.)	2.0 US fl oz			59.15mL	60mL	Before U.S. Prohibition
Hooker			2.5 imp fl oz	71.03mL		1 1/4 jigger (5 tablespoons)
Gill (Scottish)		2.5 imp. oz.		71.03mL	70mL	1/8 imperial pint. Used from 1826 to 1984.
Jack (UK)		2.5 imp. oz.		71.03mL	70mL	Historically equivalent to two jiggers or handfuls, or half a gill. No longer in general use.
Snit	3.0 US fl oz			88.72mL	90mL	Two jiggers.
Gill (U.S.)	4.0 US fl oz			118.29mL	120mL	Pronounced /ˈdʒɪl/ JIL, historically equivalent to two jacks, half a cup, or a quarter pint.
Gill (Imp.)		5.0 imp fl oz		142.07mL	150mL	Pronounced /ˈdʒɪl/ JIL, historically equivalent to two jacks, half a cup, or a quarter pint.
Tumbler (UK)	6.39 US fl oz	6 2/3 imp. oz.		189.42mL	190mL or 200mL	A British tumbler was 1/3 of an Imperial pint.
Tumbler (US)	8 US fl oz	8 1/3 imp. oz		236.58mL	235mL	An American tumbler is 1/2 of a US fluid pint, the same size as a cup.
Whiskey Barrel	53 US gallons	44 Imp. gallons		200.63L or 200.03L	200L	American Standard Barrel (ASB). An international standard measurement for whiskey.
Whiskey Hogshead	66 US gallons	55 Imp. gallons		249.84L or 250.03L	250L	An international standard measurement for whiskey.
Whiskey Butt	132 US gallons	110 Imp. gallons		499.67L or 500.07L	500L	An international standard measurement for whiskey.

=== Shot sizes ===
Shot sizes vary significantly from country to country. In the United Kingdom, serving size in licensed premises is regulated under the Weights and Measures Act (1985). A single serving size of spirits (gin, whisky, rum, and vodka) are sold in 25 ml or 35 ml quantities or multiples thereof. Beer is typically served in pints (568 ml), but is also served in half-pints or third-pints. In Israel, a single serving size of spirits is about twice as much, 50 or 60 mL.

The shape of a glass can have a significant effect on how much one pours. A Cornell University study of students and bartenders' pouring showed both groups pour more into short, wide glasses than into tall, slender glasses. Aiming to pour one shot of alcohol (1.5 ounces or 44.3 ml), students on average poured 45.5 ml and 59.6 ml (30% more) respectively into the tall and short glasses. The bartenders scored similarly, on average pouring 20.5% more into the short glasses. More experienced bartenders were more accurate, pouring 10.3% less alcohol than less experienced bartenders. Practice reduced the tendency of both groups to over pour for tall, slender glasses but not for short, wide glasses. These misperceptions are attributed to two perceptual biases:

1. Estimating that tall, slender glasses have more volume than shorter, wider glasses; and
2. Over-focusing on the height of the liquid and disregarding the width.

== Liquor bottles ==
Standard Metric Liquor Containers
Name	US customary units	Imperial units	Metric units	Notes
Miniature	1.7 US fl oz	1.8 imp fl oz	50mL	Replaced the 2 US fl oz (59 mL) US miniature-sized bottle after metrication. Typically served on airline flights. Also known as a "nip" or "shooter" in certain locales, or a “Mini” in Canada.
Half pint	6.8 US fl oz	7.0 imp fl oz	200mL	Called a media pinta in Spanish or naggin in Ireland. Called a "junior mickey" or a “flat” in Canada.
Demi	11.8 US fl oz	12.3 imp fl oz	350mL	A half-sized EU T2L Standard Liquor Bottle, considered a European metric "pint".
Shoulder	11.8 US fl oz	12.3 imp fl oz	350mL	A flask-style bottle with rounded shoulders. Common in Ireland; also called a 'double naggin' or a "daddy naggin"
Pinta	12.34 US fl oz	12.84 imp fl oz	365mL	"Pint". An intermediate between the US and European metric "pints" used for locally produced liquor in Central America. In Costa Rica it is called a Pacha ("baby bottle").
Pint	12.7 US fl oz	13.2 imp fl oz	375mL	A half-sized non-EU Standard Liquor Bottle, considered a US metric "pint". Called a mickey in Canada.
Half litre	16.9 US fl. oz.	17.6 Imp fl oz	500mL	Considered a standardized metric "pint". Common in Europe, but discontinued in the United States.
European spirit bottle	23.7 US fl oz	1 imp pt & 4.6 imp fl oz	700mL	A EU Standard Spirits Bottle used by T2L member nations to deter non-payment of duties and tariffs. (Note: The EU's adoption of standard 350- and 700-ml bottles for spirits: This regulation only affected the packaging of spirits; wine and soft drink containers were unaffected. This regulation went into effect on January 1, 1990.) Considered a European metric "quart". Common worldwide outside of the Americas and Cuba.
Fifth	25.4 US fl oz	1 imp pt & 6.4 imp fl oz	750mL	A non-EU Standard Liquor Bottle, considered a US metric "quart". Called a "two-six" or "twenty-sixer" in Canada. Also known as a Botii [ Sheng slang (derived from Italian Bottiglia) > "Bottle"] or Mzinga [ Swahili > "Cannon"] in Kenya.
Litre	33.8 US fl oz	1 imp pt & 15.2 imp fl oz	1L	Considered a standardized metric "quart".
Half gallon	59.2 US fl oz	3 imp pt & 1.6 imp fl oz	1.75L	Also known as a "handle", due to most 1.75 L bottles having a handle. Called a "60" or "60-pounder" in Canada (as in 60 US fl oz).
Texas Mickey	101.4 US fl oz	5 imp pt & 5.5 imp fl oz	3.0L	Called a "101" in Canada. Often seen in Canada for celebratory purposes. Usually contains vodka, rum or whisky. Comes with a small pump to dispense the liquor, as it is too heavy and unwieldy to pour.

Obsolete Pre-Metric Liquor Containers
Name	US customary units	Imperial units	Metric units	Notes
1/16 Pint (US)	1 US fl oz	1.04 imp fl oz	29.57mL	Former size for US brandy nip bottles before metrication. Replaced by the 50 mL "metric nip".
Miniature (US)	1.5 US fl oz	-	44.36mL	Former size for US miniature bottles before metrication that were based on the post-Prohibition jigger. Replaced by the 50 mL "metric nip".
1/10 Pint (US)	1.6 US fl oz	1.66 imp fl oz	47.31mL	Former size for US nip bottles before metrication. Replaced by the 50 mL "metric nip".
1/8 Pint (US)	2 US fl oz	2.08 imp fl oz	59.14mL	Former size for US miniature bottles before metrication that were based on the pre-Prohibition jigger. Replaced by the 50 mL "metric nip".
Twelfth (US)	11 US fl oz		325mL	A twelfth (1/12, or 0.083) of a US Gallon, rounded up from its actual volume of 10.66 US fl oz. Formerly used for beer until it was replaced by the 3/4 Pint (12 US oz.) bottle after World War 2.
Tenth (US)	12.8 US fl oz		378mL	A tenth (1/10, or 0.1) of a US gallon. Called a "Commercial Pint" because it was equivalent to 0.8 US liquid pints. Replaced by the 375 mL "metric pint".
Reputed Pint (UK)		13.3 imp oz.	378mL	The "Reputed Pint" (2/3 Imperial pint or 1/12 Imperial gallon) was devised to split a standard gallon into twelve small bottles. Originally it was based on the British Wine gallon, which was later adopted by the United States as their standard fluid gallon. This made a Wine Gallon "Reputed Pint" equivalent to 2/3 US liquid pint (10.66 US fluid oz.), 11.09 imp. oz, or 315 mL. Although the Imperial system was introduced in 1824, bottles of ale or beer were still sold in Reputed Pints (13.3 imperial oz) but were now based on the Imperial gallon (based on the British Ale Gallon). It was later replaced by the Imperial Pint (20 imp oz / 568 ml) in the 20th century.
Sixth (US)	22 US fl oz		651mL	A sixth (1/6, or 0.166) of a US Gallon, rounded up from its actual volume of 21.33 US fl oz. Formerly used for cheap liquor like gin and vodka. It was supposed to be replaced by the 500 mL "half-liter", which was dropped in 1989, but is sometimes used for craft beer and malt liquor.
Fifth (US)	25.6 US fl oz	26.66 imp oz.	757mL	A fifth (1/5, or 0.2) of a US gallon. Called a "Commercial Quart" because it was equivalent to 0.8 US fluid quarts. Replaced by the 750 mL "metric quart".
Reputed Quart (UK)	25.6 US fl oz	26.66 imp oz.	757mL	The "Reputed Quart" (2/3 Imperial quart or 1/6 Imperial gallon) was devised to split a standard gallon into six large bottles and was usually used for wine and liquor. Originally it was based on the British Wine gallon, which was later adopted by the United States as their standard fluid gallon. When the Imperial system was introduced in 1824, measures of wine or liquor were still sold in either Reputed Quarts (26.6 imp oz.) or Imperial Quarts (40 imp oz.). It was later replaced by the Imperial Quart (40 imp oz / 1136 ml) in the 20th century.
Quart (Imp.)	38.5 US fl oz	40 Imp. oz.	1.14L	Usually replaced with liter bottles in Commonwealth countries after metrication. The Quart (Imp.) is still used as a standard container for liquor in Canada, known as a "forty", "forty-pounder" or "forty-ouncer". In Canada, liter size bottles are only found at Duty Free stores.
Third (US)	42 US fl. oz.	43.71 Imp oz.	1.24L	A third (1/3, or 0.333) of a US gallon, rounded down from 42.66 US fl. oz. It was used for cheap liquor like gin and malt liquor. Later rounded down to 40 US fl. oz. (41.63 imp. oz. [1.18 L]) in the 1960s.
Half gallon (US)	64 US fl oz	66.61 Imp oz.	1.89L	A half (1/2, or 0.5) of a US gallon. Replaced by the 1.75 L "metric half-gallon" in 1976.

The British Reputed Pint and Reputed Quart were used in Great Britain and throughout the Empire from the late 17th century until the early 20th century. Originally there were different standard gallons depending on the type of alcohol. That meant that the Reputed measures varied depending on which standard gallon was used. A Reputed Pint of beer was equal to 285 mL (1/2 an Ale Pint, or equivalent to 10 imperial oz. or 9.63 US oz.) and a Reputed Quart of wine was equal to 730 mL (3/4 of a Wine Quart, or equivalent to 25.69 Imp. oz. or 24.68 US fluid oz.). When the Imperial system was adopted in 1824, the fluid gallon was standardized on the old Ale Gallon (which had 160 fluid ounces). However, Reputed pints and quarts were still used by breweries and merchants, but measurements were now based on the Imperial system. There was still confusion about whether Reputed or Imperial measures was being used by the merchant, so eventually Imperial pints and quarts were made standard in the early 20th century.

The United States adopted the British Wine Gallon (which had 128 fluid ounces) as standard. The laws concerning the production and sale of alcohol stated that it had to be sold in portions of a gallon for tax purposes. A standard case of bottled beer, wine or liquor had to be equal to two gallons and bottles came in half-dozens and dozens rather than fourths (quarts) and eighths (pints). There would be 24 small bottles (Twelfths of a US gallon) or 12 large bottles (Sixths of a US gallon) per case. The bottles were later increased in size (Tenths and Fifths of a US gallon) to be equivalent to British Reputed Pints and Quarts, allowing them to be interchangeable for export. The American liquor industry later referred to these measures as "Commercial Pints" (Tenths) and "Commercial Quarts" (Fifths).

== Wine measurements ==
The following table contains various measurements that are commonly applied to wine.

Name	US fluid ounces (approx.)	Metric units	No. of 750 mL bottles	Notes
Small glass (UK)	4.2	125mL	1/6	Measure by the glass used in pubs, bars and restaurants in the UK
Medium glass (UK)	5.9	175mL	~1/4	Measure by the glass used in pubs, bars and restaurants in the UK
Quarter bottle	6.3	187.5mL	1/4	Also known as a piccolo, pony, snipe or split. They are commonly served in packs of 4 bottles.
Large glass (UK)	8.5	250mL	1/3	Measure by the glass used in pubs, bars and restaurants in the UK
Chopine	8.5	250mL	1/3	Bordeaux region. A metric half-pint.
Half bottle	12.7	375mL	1/2	Also known as a demi.
Half Litre	16.9	500mL	2/3	Used for sweet wines like Tokays and Sauternes.
Bottle	25.4	750mL	1	Standard Bottle for wine and spirits.
Litre	33.8	1L	1 1/3	Popular size for wines introduced by Austrian Grüner Veltliner wine producers in the late 1990s. Also used by German, Chilean and American producers since the late 2000s.
Magnum	50.7	1.5L	2	
Marie Jeanne	76	2.25L	3	Bordeaux region. Usually used for a Claret wine bottle.
Tregnum	76	2.25L	3	Port wine bottle. Also called "Tappit hen", from a Scottish breed of chicken from the Shetland Isles with a tuft of feathers on the top of its head. The red sealing wax over the cork stopper resembles a red tuft of feathers.
Double Magnum	101.4	3L	4	Bordeaux region
Jeroboam (Champagne)	101.4	3L	4	Champagne region
Four Litre (US)	135.3	4L	5 1/3	American still wines.
Jeroboam	152.2	4.5L	6	
Rehoboam	152.2	4.5L	6	Champagne and Burgundy regions
Jeroboam (Bordeaux) or MacKenzie	169	5L	6 2/3	Bordeaux region.
Five Litre (US)	169	5L	6 2/3	American still wines.
Imperial	202.9	6L	8	Bordeaux region
Methuselah	202.9	6L	8	Champagne and Burgundy regions
Seven Litre (US)	236.7	7L	9 1/3	American still wines.
Eight Litre (US)	270.5	8L	10 2/3	American still wines.
Salmanazar	304.3	9L	12	Champagne region.
Ten Litre (US)	338.1	10L	13 1/3	American still wines.
Balthazar	405.8	12L	16	One of the Three Wise Men who presented gifts to the infant Jesus.
Nebuchadnezzar	507.2	15L	20	Champagne region.
Melchior	608.7	18L	24	Champagne region.
Solomon	676	20L	26	Champagne region.
Primat or Goliath	912	27L	36	Champagne region.
Melchizedek	1014	30L	40	Champagne region.

The 750 mL Standard wine bottle was chosen because it was the standard French wine bottle once moulded glass bottles were available in the 19th century. Previously there was a roughly 730 mL limit to glass-blown bottles because that was the limit of a glassblower's lungs. The volume was rounded up to 750 mL and then was used as the base size for French wine containers, with all subdivisions and multiples figured from it. The rest of the world followed suit with equivalent customary measurement versions of their own (like the British Reputed Quart).

Following metrication in 1980, American still wines can also be sold in large multi-liter containers, but only in full liters. They are typically sold in glass demijohns or foil bag-in-box containers holding 4, 5, 7, 8, or 10 Liters.

Obsolete Pre-Metric and Metric Containers
Name	US fluid ounces (approx.)	Metric units	No. of 750 mL bottles	Notes
Half Bottle (US)	12	354.8mL	~1/2 Bottle	Used for domestically produced sparkling white wine in the place of the French metric 375 mL champagne punt. Rounded-down from 12.68 US fl oz (375 mL). Still wines (Red, White, and Rosé) came in US pint (16 US fl. oz., or 473 mL) and Tenth (12.8 US fl.oz., or 378 mL) bottles. Replaced in 1980 with the metric 375 mL Demi Bottle for both still and sparkling wines.
Half Liter (US)	16.9	500mL	2/3 Bottle	Was one of the eight standardized US metric bottle sizes listed on January 1, 1980, but was withdrawn on June 30, 1989. Still used in countries that sell wine in half-liters and liters.
Bottle (US)	25	739.3mL	~1 Bottle	Used for domestically produced sparkling white wine in the place of the French metric 750 mL champagne punt. Rounded down from 25.36 US fl oz (750 mL). Still wines (Red, White, and Rose) came in US quart (32 US fl oz / 946 mL) or Fifth (25.6 US fl oz / 757 mL) bottles. Replaced in 1980 with the metric 750 mL Standard Bottle for both still and sparkling wines.
Sovereign	887 (6.92 US gallons)	26.25L	35 Bottles	Champagne bottle created specially by Taittinger's in 1988 for the launch of Sovereign of the Seas, the world's largest cruise ship at the time. Only five bottles were made and the firm has not made others since.
