= NIP =

NIP or nip may refer to:

== Acronyms ==
- National Industries Park, an industrial park in Dubai, UAE
- National Immunization Program, a part of the Centers for Disease Control and Prevention
- National Independence Party (UK), minor far-right political party in 1970s UK
- National Infrastructure Pipeline, a group of social and economic infrastructure projects in India
- National Institute of Physics, at the University of the Philippines Diliman
- Niggas in Paris
- Ninjas in Pyjamas, a professional esports organization
- NIP (model theory), a property of theories in mathematical logic
- Northern Independence Party, minor political party seeking independence for the north of England
- Northern Ireland Protocol
- Notice of Intended Prosecution, for criminal prosecution in the United Kingdom
- Numer Identyfikacji Podatkowej, a tax identification number in Poland

== Others ==
- Nip (surname), Cantonese spelling of Nie
- Nip, an abbreviation from Nippon (日本), the Japanese name for Japan, used as ethnic slurs against people of Japanese descent and origin
- The Nips, punk band
- Nipped is a 1914 American short silent drama film featuring Sessue Hayakawa and Tsuru Aoki
- Nip, short for nipple
- Nip, synonym for pinch
- Miniature (alcohol), colloquially "nip", a 50-60 mL liquor bottle.
- Nip, short for nipperkin, a Dutch unit measurement for liquor, approximately 59-71 mL.

== See also ==
- Nippy
- Nip/Tuck
- NIPS (disambiguation)
- Nipper (disambiguation)
