= NIPS =

NIPS or Nips may refer to:

- Conference on Neural Information Processing Systems
- Network Intrusion Prevention System
- Nips, derogative word for Japanese people
- The Nips, punk band
- Northern Ireland Prison Service
- Non-Invasive Prenatal Screening, see Prenatal testing
- Miniature (alcohol) - liquor bottles 50-60 mL

== See also ==
- NIP (disambiguation)
