= Acton Castle =

Cornish historic building

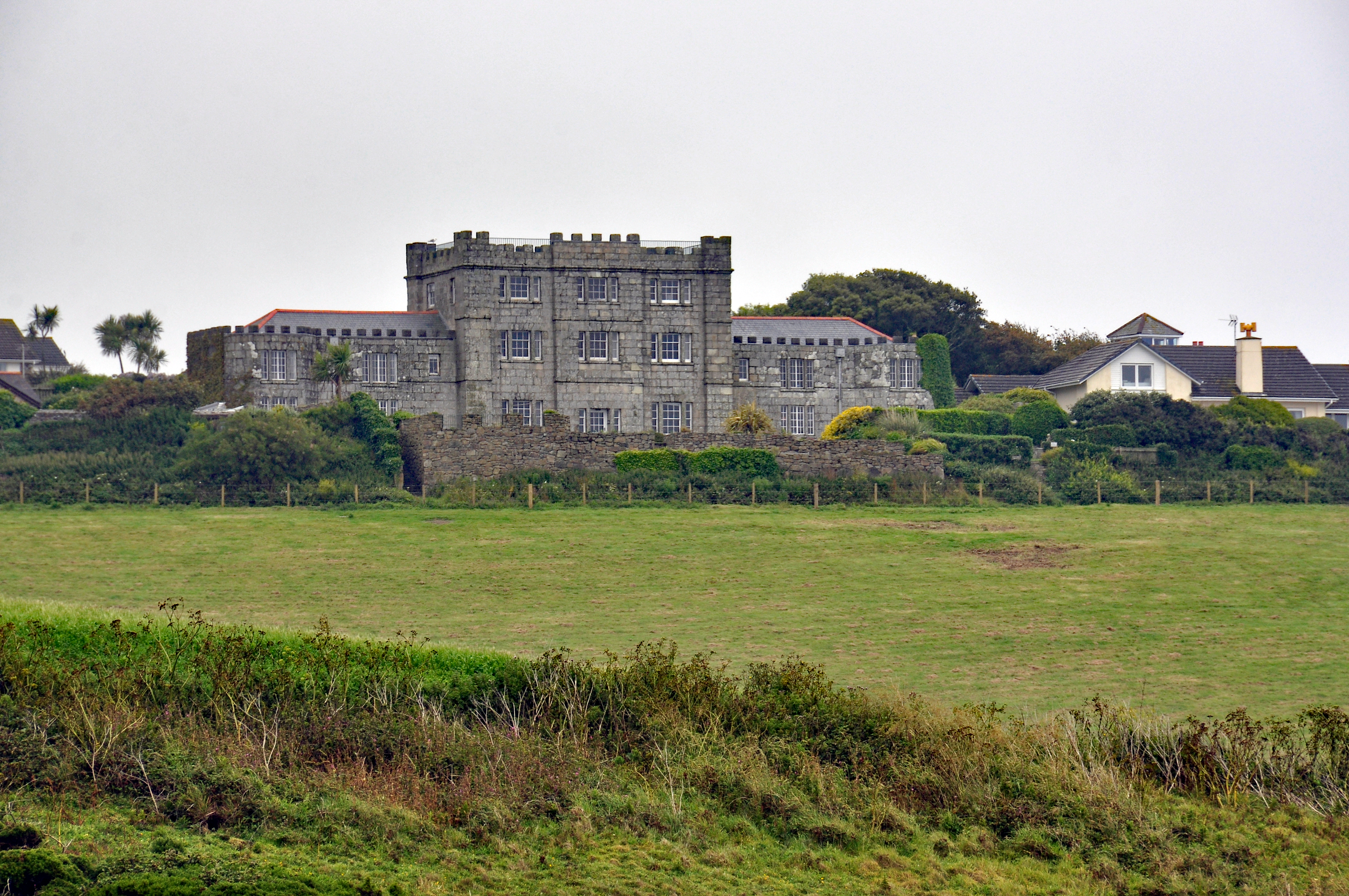

- Location within Cornwall
- 50.10544°N 5.42565°W
- Location: Perranuthnoe, Cornwall, England

Listed Building – Grade II*
- Official name: Acton Castle
- Designated: 9 October 1987
- Reference no.: 1160515

Acton Castle (Cornish: Kastel Acton) is a small castellated mansion near Perranuthnoe, Cornwall. It is a Grade II* listed building. It was built c. 1775, and according to some sources around 1790, by John Stackhouse of Pendarves, who was a distinguished botanist with an interest in seaweed and plants mentioned by Theophrastus. Stackhouse constructed the castle, with the main purpose of studying marine algae. The primary material used for the construction is granite, with the facade and the chimneys made of dressed granite. It has a grouted roof with walls topped by embattled parapets. Wings of two storeys, with tripartite windows, were added at the beginning of the 20th century during its conversion to a country hotel.

The castle is named after Susana Stackhouse née Acton, the wife of John Stackhouse, and the heiress of Edward Acton of Acton Scott. John Stackhouse sold the castle to Bulkeley Mackworth Praed, son of William Mackworth Praed a short time before his death. Praed died at the castle on 6 October 1852. The castle passed to his sister, who sold it to Thomas Field, who took up residence at the castle and stayed here for a number of years. In 1861 he sold the castle to Richard Lanyon. After Lanyon's death, his widow remained at the castle till her death in 1899.

Below the castle is what is now known as Stackhouse Cove, where Stackhouse pursued his studies. Remains of several large tanks, that were used to hold the seaweed for Stackhouse's research can still be found on the grounds today. In 1797 he published his illustrated work Nereis Britannica.

During the time the Stackhouses were the owners of the castle, one of their tenants, a local by the name of John Carter who rented the adjoining farm, took advantage of the infrequency of their residence at the castle and used the castle and the cove nearby as a smugglers den. Carter, a prolific smuggler, also known by his nickname, the "King of Prussia", gave Prussia Cove its name. At one occasion, he even secreted his brother Harry, who had escaped from prison, at the castle. According to local legends, he even constructed tunnels leading from inside the castle premises to the Stackhouse Cove below. The castle was converted into a country hotel during the middle of the twentieth century, but was closed down in 1980s due to lack of business. It was then developed into luxury apartments, as can be seen today.
