= Carters of Prussia Cove =

Family of Cornish smugglers in England

A Cornish Smuggler; by Captain Harry Carter, of Prussia Cove) 1749–1809

The Carters of Prussia Cove were a family of Cornish smugglers active in the late 18th century operating out of Prussia Cove, Cornwall, where they had a hideout/home in a remote cliff next to the ocean.

Much of what is known about the Carters came from Harry Carter's autobiography, The Autobiography of a Cornish Smuggler, and folklore passed down through the generations.

== Family history ==
Several Carter families are known in Cornwall from at least the middle of the 16th century. The Carter family later associated with Prussia Cove had roots in Breage and Germoe. Francis Carter married Annice (also recorded as Agnes) Williams in 1736, and the couple were recorded as having ten children:

- Thomas Carter (1737-1818), married Alice Carter of Breage in December 1766 and had nine children. Died in June 1818 and is buried in Breage.
- John Carter (1738-1803), married Joan Richards of Breage in September 1765 and had six children. Died intestate in November 1803, being buried in Breage. Also known as the 'King of Prussia' and lent his name to Prussia Cove (or King's Cove) which had previously been called Porthleah. John obtained the nickname because he was said to closely resemble Frederick the Great, the King of Prussia, and was said to much admire him. John was a devout Methodist and had a reputation for honest-dealing as a smuggler.
- Frances Carter (1739-1744)
- Ann Carter (1742-?), married Richard Champion who became involved in the family's smuggling enterprise.
- Francis Carter (1744-1814), married Mary Stephens of Breage by special licence in October 1776 and had ten children. Died in December 1814 and was buried in Breage.
- Alse Carter (died in infancy)
- Harry Carter (1749-1829), married Elizabeth Flindell of Manaccan in April 1786 and had one child. Gave up smuggling after his return from a French prison, and became a preacher. Died April 1829 and was buried in Breage.
- Edward Carter (1751-c.1790), married Jane Polglaze of Breage in December 1785 and had two children. Died intestate before 18 October 1790, when Jane remarried.
- Roger Carter (1754-c.1780), married Rebecca Ford of St Hilary by special licence in January 1779. Had no children and died intestate. Buried in Breage in October 1780.
- Charles Carter (1757-1803), married Catherinda Blewett of St Hilary by special licence in February 1778 and had five children. Died intestate and was buried in Breage in May 1803.

== Smuggling ==
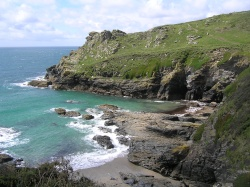
Prussia Cove, where the Carters based their smuggling ring

Through their long-running and successful smuggling, the Carters became an important part of the economy in West Cornwall, providing a source of employment and illicit goods for local people. Customs officers were "violently obstructed", and in order to successfully seize smuggled goods needed to be protected by military force.

=== Early ventures ===
The Carters were initially involved in privateering during Britain's wars against America, France, Spain or the Netherlands, obtaining letters of marque for several of their ships. One of the Carters' privateer ships, captained by Harry, was lost when it was seized by French authorities upon docking in St Malo for repairs.

=== Cawsand attack ===
On 31 January 1788 Harry Carter took a cargo to Cawsand in the Revenge to be landed to a waiting team which included his brother Charles. The ship's hatches were opened to two boats which were assumed to be part of the landing party; the boats were actually from HMS Druid. The Revenge fired on HMS Druid, killing one of her crew and injuring seven more, before being boarded. Harry was badly injured in the fight on board Revenge and only survived being captured by throwing himself overboard and pulling himself to shore using the ship's ropes. Ten of the smugglers were captured and impressed into the Navy, and six were killed.

A reward of £300 was offered for Harry Carter's capture, but he evaded discovery, at one point hiding in Acton Castle. He later went into exile in America with the help of the Dunkins, a Penzance smuggling family, on board their ship, the George.

=== 1793 trial ===
In February 1793, Charles was put on trial by the Attorney General (then Sir John Scott) in the Court of Exchequer. He was advised by Christopher Wallis, a lawyer from Helston who was closely aligned with many Cornish smugglers, and was represented by two other lawyers. The actual charges against Charles are unknown, but the Attorney General sought to recover treble the value of smuggled alcohol which was seized in a cellar belonging to him. His defence argument was that he did not own the cellars in which the smuggled goods had been found, but this was thrown out. The jury found Charles guilty and he was ordered to pay £1469 12s.

As he could not pay, he was probably imprisoned. During the French Revolutionary Wars, smugglers were able to be pardoned if they served in the Royal Navy; Charles tried negotiate for twenty men to serve in his place, but this was strongly opposed by the Excise Commissioners who described him as "one of the most notorious Smugglers" and so not deserving of leniency. The outcome of his petition is unknown, but he is recorded as still being in a debtors' prison in May 1795 and having returned to Cornwall by September 1799.

=== Decline ===
After Harry Carter's exile and later retirement, customs officers tried to fully destroy the Carter smuggling ring. Towards the end of his life, John Carter handed over to his son-in-law Will Richards. In 1801, a smuggling vessel was spotted from St Michael's Mount by customs officers and forced to flee, leaving 100 ankers of spirits to be seized at the cove. John Carter died in 1803 and the lease on Prussia Cove was put up for sale the same year. In 1825, a row of Coastguard cottages were built to look down onto the cove, so ending the possibility of any more large scale smuggling operations.

== Legacy ==
The Carters have been described as "among the most famous of all the Cornish smugglers" by the BBC and as "Cornwall's most famous 'free traders'" by The Guardian. Smuggling similar to that of the Carters was featured in the 1975 Poldark, with scenes being filmed in Prussia Cove.
