= Patiala peg =

Regional style of liquor measurement in India

The Patiala peg is a peg of whisky in which the amount is decided based on the height between the top of the index and base of the little fingers when held parallel to one another, against the side of the standard 26.5 oz (750ml) glass bottle. This has been confused with Chinese peg at times, in which water is poured followed by liquor thus forming two distinct layers.

The name originates from the city of Patiala, which was once a state known globally for the extravagant ways of its royalty and extraordinary height of its Sikh soldiers.

There are multiple theories how the measure got its name, all of which revolve around Maharaja Sir Bhupinder Singh who ruled the princely state of Patiala from 1900 until his death in 1938. An enigmatic personality who came to rule when he was nine years old, Maharaja Bhupinder was a man with fine tastes. It is believed that the Maharaja had a polo team that consisted of legendary Sikh warriors like himself. He invited an Irish team called Viceroy's Pride for a friendly tournament of 'tent pegging' (a competition where players on horseback have to pierce and pull out small objects embedded in the ground, usually wooden plates of the dimensions of the sole of a size 12 shoe, with their lances). The Irish team arrived, all as imposing as their Sikh counterparts. The Irish team members were known to be heavy drinkers. Wherever this competition was held, there used to be a party night before and Irish were known to drink to full capacity and perform at their best the next day. Same as routine, a night before the competition, a party was held in Patiala, huge amounts of whisky was served to both teams and both teams drank to their capacity. Next day, the Irish team woke up with the effect of the whisky still on them and could not display their best and thus they lost the competition. From that day onwards, the Patiala team became famous for their drinking capacity and Patiala Peg for its strong effect of alcohol. A related and popular measure of liquor popular in Punjab is the Greg Peg . It is a volume roughly equivalent to 120ml, though the rough and ready measure is the amount of liquor needed to fill a small tumbler. The name originates from the city of Patiala in Indian state of Punjab, and is about twice as large as a normal shot glass. The Greg Peg was first made by Greg Kennedy (generally attributed to being an American citizen) to outdo native Punjabis while drinking Scotch Whisky. According to legend, a Punjabi drinker, in the legendary Mountview Hotel in Chandigarh, told Greg that the world's largest peg was a Patiala Peg. Not to be outdone, Greg announced the largest peg in the world was actually a Greg Peg and it was twice as large as a large Peg. The name stuck with the trendy crowd and is now used in the bars and nightclubs in Punjab by young men hoping to show their virility and masculinity

• Cultural Context: In Punjab, drinking culture, particularly around liquor, often involves larger-than-life servings and communal drinking sessions. The Patiala Peg itself is a well-known measure, usually attributed to the Maharaja of Patiala, known for his royal hospitality and large gatherings where drinks were served generously.

• Greg Peg's Origins: While the story of Greg Kennedy and the creation of the Greg Peg is compelling, it's worth noting that such myths or legends often evolve over time. They serve not only as a narrative but also as a symbol of one-upmanship and camaraderie in drinking circles.

• Symbolism: The Greg Peg, like the Patiala Peg, isn't just about the volume of liquor but symbolizes a challenge, a test of endurance, and a display of boldness or machismo among drinkers. It's a part of the social ritual where the quantity of alcohol consumed can be seen as a marker of one's capacity to handle it, often linked with notions of masculinity or social standing.

• Modern Usage: In contemporary settings, the Greg Peg might be invoked more for fun or as a nod to historical drinking lore rather than for regular consumption. It could be seen in themed parties or among friends trying to outdo each other in a controlled environment, where the focus might be more on the fun of the ritual than on the actual consumption.

This legend, highlights how drinking customs can evolve into cultural phenomena, reflecting both the heritage of the region and the influence of external characters like Greg Kennedy in this narrative.

Another version of the story is similar, but refers to cricket rather than polo.

Generally, the Patiala Peg is referred to for its particular volume and strong residual effect, and the measure is associated with the region of Punjab.

== See also ==
- Peg (unit)
