= John Stackhouse (botanist) =

British botanist (1742-1819)

John Stackhouse (1742 – 22 November 1819) was an English botanist, primarily interested in spermatophytes, algae and mycology. He was born in Probus, Cornwall, and built Acton Castle, above Stackhouse Cove, Cornwall, in order to further his studies about the propagation of algae from their spores. He was the author of Nereis Britannica; or a Botanical Description of British Marine Plants, in Latin and English, accompanied with Drawings from Nature (1797).

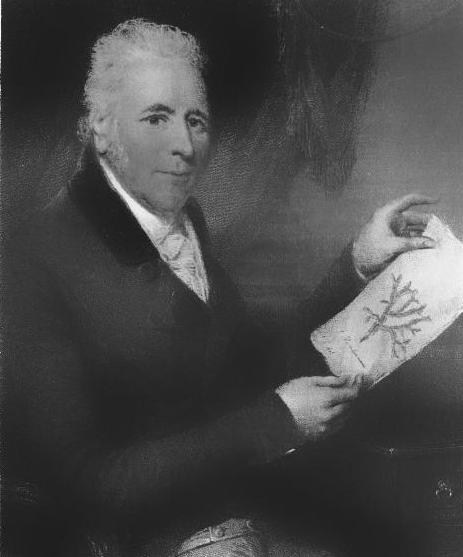
John Stackhouse, 1811 lithograph.

== Personal life ==
The second son of William Stackhouse, D.D. (d. 1771), rector of St. Erme, Cornwall, and nephew of Thomas Stackhouse, he was born at Trehane, Probus, in Cornwall. On 20 June 1758 he matriculated at Exeter College, Oxford, and was a Fellow of the college from 1761 to 1764. On succeeding his relative, Mrs. Grace Percival, sister of Sir William Pendarves, in the Pendarves estates in 1763, he resigned his fellowship, and, after travelling abroad for two or three years, settled on his newly acquired property. In 1804 he resigned the estate to his eldest surviving son, and retired to Bath.

On 21 April 1773 Stackhouse married Susanna Acton, only daughter and heir of Edward Acton of Acton Scott, Shropshire and they had four sons and three daughters. The eldest son, John, died young. The second, Edward William, assumed the surname of Pendarves in 1815. The third son, Thomas Pendarves, succeeded to the estate of Acton Scott, and assumed the additional surname of Acton in 1834.

Stackhouse died at his house at Edgar Buildings, Bath, on 22 November 1819. His name was commemorated by Sir James Edward Smith in the Australian plant genus Stackhousia.

== Works ==
From an early period Stackhouse devoted himself to botany, and especially to the study of seaweeds and of the plants mentioned by Theophrastus. About 1775 he erected Acton Castle at Perranuthnoe to pursue his researches. He was one of the early fellows of the Linnean Society, elected in 1795.

Stackhouse's major works were Nereis Britannica, Illustrationes Theophrasti, and his edition of Theophrastus's Historia Plantarum. The Nereis Britannica, which was issued in parts, deals mainly with the brown algal seawracks or fuci, and was based on his own researches, discussions with James Edward Smith, comments on proofs by friends and the herbaria of Dillenius, Bobart, and Linnæus. The complete work, which was printed privately and published in folio at Bath, with Latin and English text and twelve coloured plates by the author, appeared as part I in 1795, part II in 1797 and part III in 1801. An enlarged edition, with twenty-four coloured plates, was published at Bath in 1801, in folio; and another at Oxford in 1816, in quarto, with Latin text only and twenty plates. The Illustrationes Theophrasti in usum Botanicorum præcipue peregrinantium, Oxford, 1811, contains a lexicon and three catalogues giving the Linnæan names of the plants mentioned. The edition of Theophrasti Eresii de Historia Plantarum libri decem, "perhaps the most unsatisfactory" ever published (according to Benjamin Daydon Jackson, Guide to the Literature of Botany (1881), p. 22), in 2 vols. 1813 and 1814, contains the Greek text, Latin notes, a glossary and Greek-Latin and Latin-Greek catalogues of the plants. From it Stackhouse reprinted in a separate form De Libanoto, Smyrna, et Balsamo Theophrasti Notitiæ, with prefatory Extracts from James Bruce's Travels in Abyssinia, Bath, 1815.

Papers by Stackhouse were published in the Transactions of the Linnean Society (vols. iii. and v.), dated 1795 and 1798, in the Classical Journal, dated 1815 and 1816 (xi. 154–5, xiii. 445–8, xiv. 289–93), and one, entitled Tentamen Marino-cryptogamicum, and dated Bath, 1807, in the Mémoires de la Société des Naturalistes of Moscow, as a fellow (1809, ii. 50–97).

Stackhouse also contributed a translation in English verse to the second edition of the Abbate Alberto Fortis's Dei Cataclismi sofferti dal nostro pianeta, saggio poetico (London, 1786), and he made contributions to William Coxe's Literary Life and Select Works of Benjamin Stillingfleet.

== Legacy ==
Letters and his notebooks related to the Nereis Britannica are in the Linnean Society archive.
