= Naggin =

Unit of volume for measuring spirits

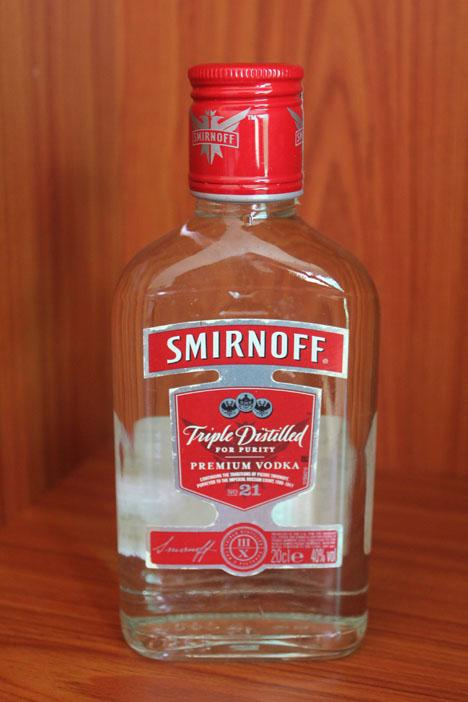
A Naggin of Smirnoff vodka

In Ireland, a naggin is a 200ml bottle of spirits. Spirits are commonly sold in this size in off licences, especially independent (non-chain) shops.

== Etymology ==
According to the Oxford English Dictionary, naggin is a variant of noggin, a word of uncertain origin recorded from the seventeenth century and meaning a small quantity of alcohol, usually one gill (0.25 imperial pints (140 mL)). Tomás S. Ó Máille derives it from the Irish naigín, cnaigín, a small wooden pail with a capacity of two glasses.
