= Nipper (disambiguation) =

Nipper was a dog, best known as the subject of the His Master's Voice trademark.

Nipper or Nippers may also refer to:

- Nipper (Canadian comics), a comic strip by Doug Wright between 1949 and 1967
- Nipper (comics), a British comic book
- Chela (organ), a grasping structure on the limb of a crustacean or other arthropods
- Nipper (tool), a tool used to remove small amounts of a hard material
- Diagonal pliers, a tool used to cut wires. UK English and Irish English jargon.
- Nippers, young surf lifesavers
- Tipsy Nipper, a light aircraft
- Jim "Nipper" Bradford (1926–2005), Australian rules footballer
- William "Nipper" Truscott (1886–1966), Australian rules footballer
- Nipper's Harbour, a community in Newfoundland & Labrador, Canada
- Nipper Building, an apartment block in New Jersey, USA
- The Nipper, 1930 film directed by Louis Mercanton
- The Nipper (award), Canadian literary award

People with the surname Nipper:

- Al Nipper (born 1959), Major League Baseball coach
- Zack Nipper, American artist

== See also ==
- NIP (disambiguation)
- Nippur, an ancient Sumerian city
