= The Barley Mow (song) =

Drinking song

"The Barley Mow" (Roud 944) is a cumulative song celebrated in the traditions of folk music of England, Ireland, and Scotland. William Chappell transcribed the lyrics in his two-volume work The Ballad Literature and Popular Music of the Olden Time (1855).

"The Barley Mow" has become a drinking song sung while comrades empty their glasses. In one "Barley Mow" drinking game, any participant who fails to sing the song's (progressively expanding) refrain in a single breath must drink. In another, participants drink just after singing the second line in each verse ("Good luck to the barley mow"); if one's glass is not empty by the final verse, one must finish the drink after singing the line.

A barley mow is a stack (mow) of barley, especially barley that was cultivated and then harvested. Barley is a grain that is commonly malted for brewing beer.

== Lyrics ==
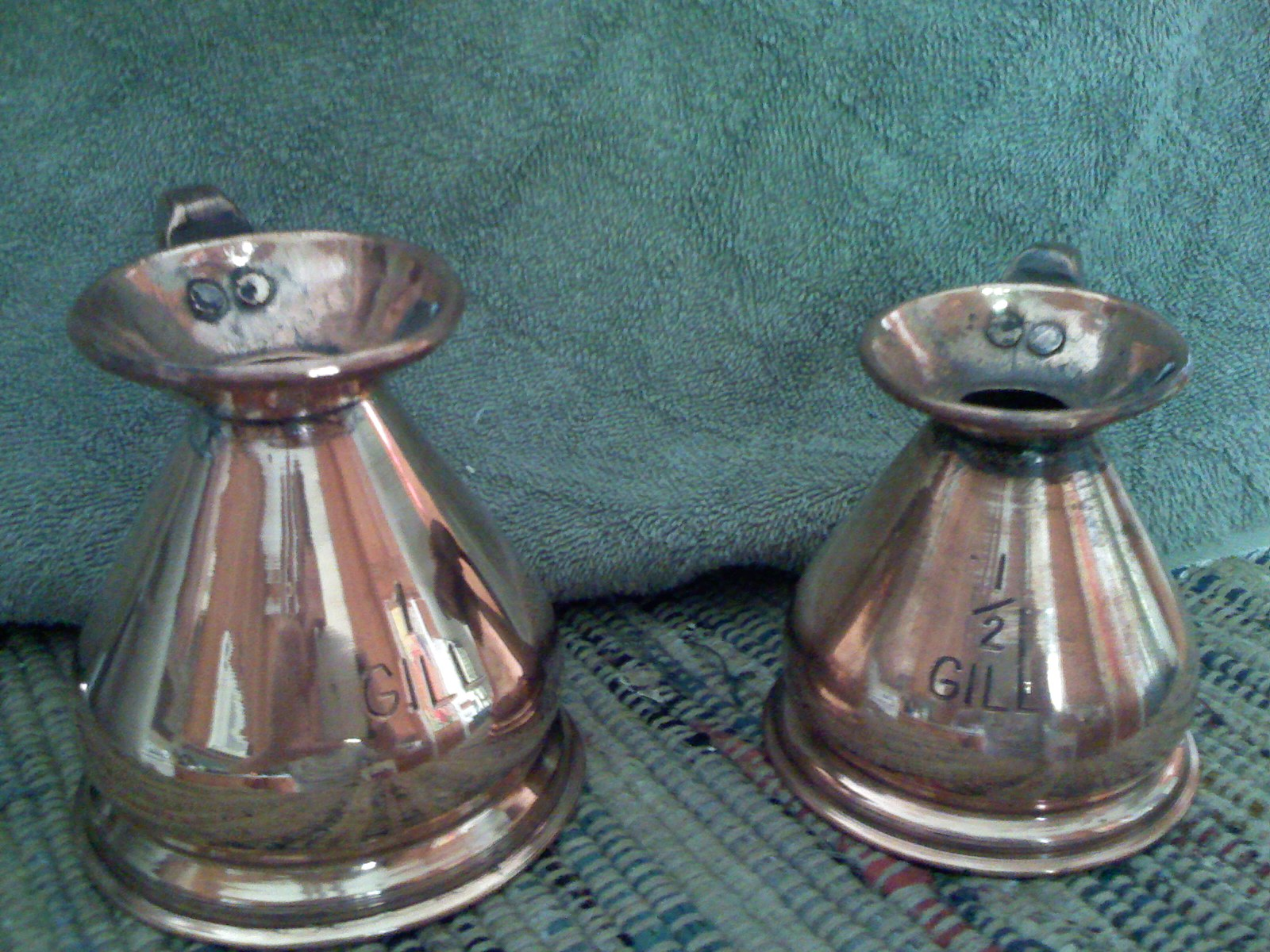
Copper jugs of capacity 1 gill and 1/2 gill.

The verses of "The Barley Mow" wish good luck to various sizes of vessels of alcoholic beverages, and lastly to the barley mow, a venerable reserve of one of beer's key ingredients. Later verses supplement this list with roles and occupations associated with beer, from brewing, to distribution, to serving in public houses, to drinking. Each verse wishes good luck to a new subject, which is then added to the beginning of the litany recited in the second line of the refrain.

The song has several variations. The 12 terms between landlord and round bowl are English units—particularly units used to measure the volume of alcoholic beverages. These are sung in descending order from largest (barrel) to smallest (round bowl). Round bowl (sometimes sung brown bowl) indicates either a humble, wooden bowl, or a person's hands cupped together into the shape of a bowl. It can also refer to the small bowl suspended from the tap in a beer barrel that catches the drips.

The lyrics to an Irish version of the song are as follows

Here's good luck to the pint pot
good luck to the barley mow
jolly good luck to the pint pot
good luck to the barley mow
oh the pint pot, half a pint
gill pot, half a gill, quarter gill
nipperkin and the brown bowl
here's good luck
good luck to the barley mow

here's good luck to the
quart pot, good luck to the barley mow etc.
half gallon
gallon
half barrel
barrel
landlord
landlady
daughter
drayer
slavey
bookie
brewer
company

Company refers to the party of people gathered together singing the song. A slavey is a servant, hired either to assist in the brewing process or to serve beer (in addition to the landlord—the publican—or his daughter, also mentioned in the song). A drayer is a person who transports heavy loads of goods (such as barrels of beer) in a type of horse-drawn cart called a dray. A bookie is the colloquial term for a bookkeeper, a person employed to maintain accounts of income and outgo.
