= Prussia Cove =

Coordinates: 50.1013°N 5.4186°W

Prussia Cove: Cornish: Porthlegh
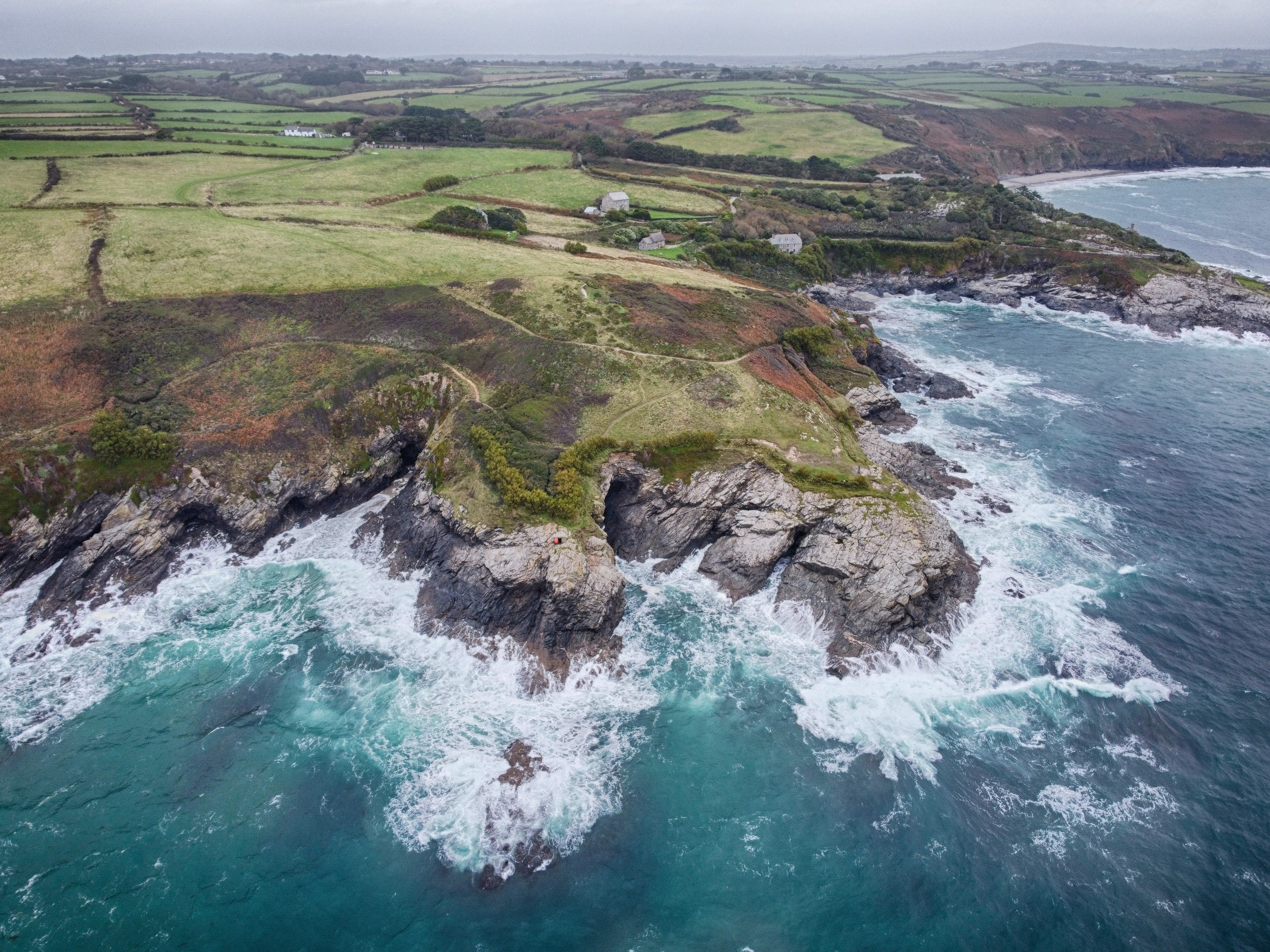

- Location within Cornwall
- OS grid reference: SW556299
- Unitary authority: Cornwall
- Ceremonial county: Cornwall
- Region: South West
- Country: England
- Sovereign state: United Kingdom
- Post town: PENZANCE
- Postcode district: TR20
- Dialling code: 01736
- Police: Devon and Cornwall
- Fire: Cornwall
- Ambulance: South Western
- UK Parliament: St Ives

Prussia Cove (Cornish: Porthlegh, meaning slab-stone cove), formerly called King's Cove, is a small private estate on the coast of Mount's Bay and to the east of Cudden Point, west Cornwall, England, United Kingdom.

Part of the area is designated as a Site of Special Scientific Interest (SSSI), a Geological Conservation Review site and is in an Area of Outstanding Natural Beauty (AONB). It consists of four small coves and several cottages and houses. The names of the coves from west to east are Piskies, Bessy's, King's and Coule's. The area is accessible by foot from the South West Coast Path

== History ==
Prussia Cove is known for the 18th-century ship-wrecker and smuggler John Carter (born 1738), also known as the "King of Prussia"; thought to be from a childhood game he played and the origin of the name for the area. Evidence of smuggling can be inferred by the building of the terrace of seven listed cottages overlooking Coule's Cove and Mount's Bay. They were built in 1826 by the Coastguard and are known as Coastguard Cottages.

'Calamity at Prussia Cove'

Subscriptions advertised on 21 April 1841 amounted to £279-11-51/2d.

More are listed, including £1 from the Bishop of Oxford.

The sum collected will be lodged in the saving's bank, Penzance, in the names of the Rev. M.N. Peters, Capt. Alexander Shairp, R.N. Capt. Thomas Mathias, R.N., and the Inspecting Commander of the Coast Guard in the Penzance district, for the time being, as Trustees for the distribution of the fund. It will be applied to apprentice, and put out to service, the children that are, and may be, of a suitable age, – in the meantime the widows (under certain regulations) will receive £1 annually for the support of each of the children, and the same for themselves. Provision is made for the parties not becoming chargeable to any parish to which they do not belong. The sum of £12 will be awarded to the parents of John Carter Richards of Prussia Cove, who lost his life on the same occasion.

The parties for whom this sum has been collected, impressed with a deep sense of the great benefits conferred on them, most humbly beg to express their very grateful acknowledgement for the generous relief extended to them.

Penzance Gazette 28 April 1841.

On Sunday last, the bodies of Lieut. Smith and Wellspring, the chief boatman, who were so unfortunately drowned at Prussia Cove, in nobly attempting to render assistance to their fellow mariner, were picked up – the bodies were disfigured. Yesterday, that of Lieut. Smith was interred at Breage, and that of Wellspring, at Madron – the latter was carried from Penzance there by eight bearers, preceded by about twenty teetotalers, wearing white ribbon with a teetotal medal suspended – and a white flag, borne by the front member of that body: the whole joining in singing an appropriate hymn. The coffin was covered with a large flag. As the solemn and affecting procession proceeded up causewayhead, hundreds of individuals had assembled, whose mournful countenances spoke audibly of their inward feeling and many were the expressions of sorry, regret and pity which involuntarily escaped them. The liberal manner in which subscribers have come forward toward the pecuniary relief of the poor widows and children is a sufficient proof that all entertain the greatest sympathy for the afflicted.

Prussia Cove once had a small fishing industry. Mackerel were caught by seine net and seven of its small fleet of fishing boats were destroyed by a storm on 7 October 1880.

Built above and overlooking the coves is a Victorian house built in 1885 for du Boulay, former Archdeacon of Cornwall in his retirement. The coastal path passes through a "circus" formed by the listed buildings of Porth-en-Alls and include a crescent shaped "Lodge". The complex was designed and built by Philip Tilden in 1911 for Brian Tunstall-Behrens, but was never completed due to the Great War.

In April 1947 HMS Warspite ran aground here whilst being towed to the breakers yard. She was later towed to, beached and broken up at Marazion.

== Cudden Point to Prussia Cove SSSI ==
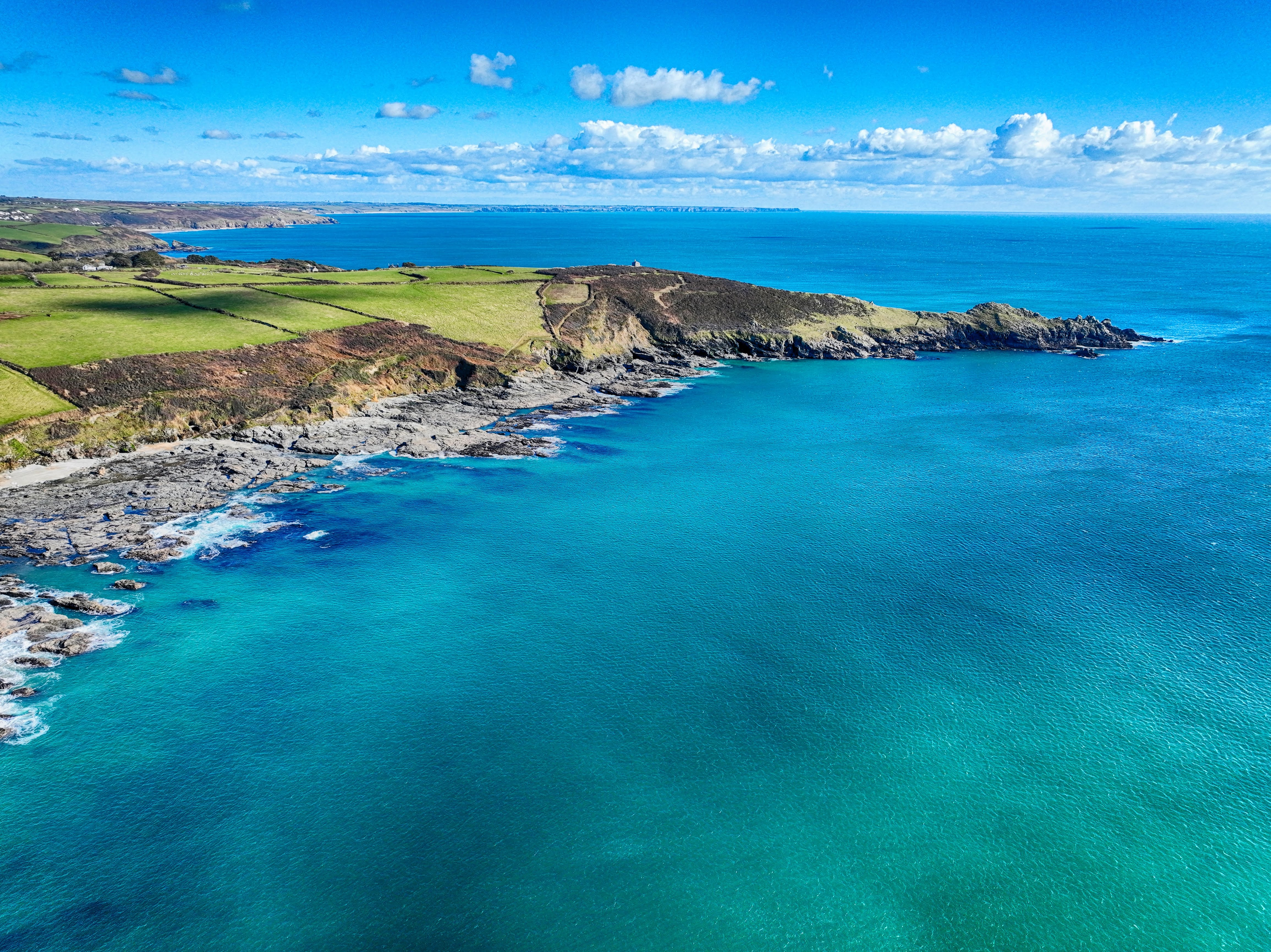
Cudden Point from the West

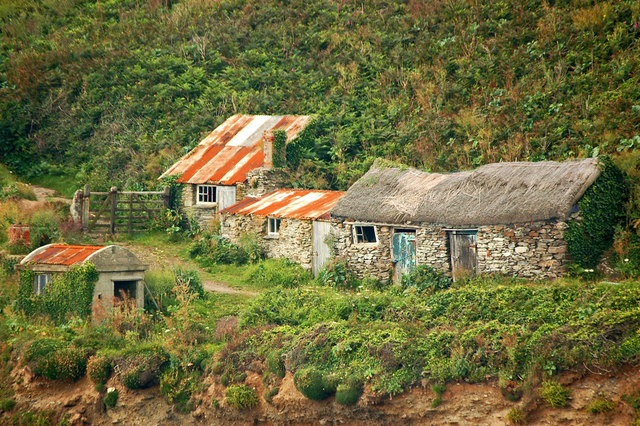
Fishermens huts

Cudden Point is a prominent headland, owned by the National Trust which can be clearly seen from most of Mount's Bay. Together with Little Cudden and Piskies Cove, the area is designated as a Site of Special Scientific Interest (SSSI) and is listed, for its national importance, in the Geological Conservation Review. The SSSI notification reads:

″This is the best example in Cornwall of a mildly metamorphosed, differentiated tholeiitic intrusive greenstone that retains good relict igneous textures and mineralogy. It is characteristic of relatively large intrusive dolerite-gabbro sills in Cornwall and unique in that it is of tholeiitic composition and not alkaline. It is also internally differentiated and contains rare relicts of primary brown amphibole. The sheared and deformed marginal facies has a chemistry indicative of contact metamorphism by hidden, shallow granite extension from the nearby Godolphin diapir.″

The vegetation consists of small patches of coastal grassland with colonies of the silver-studded blue (Plebejus argus), small pearl-bordered fritillary (Boloria selene) and grayling (Hipparchia semele) butterflies. Gorse (Ulex europaeus) and bramble (Rubus fruticosus) dominate on the more fertile soils. Above the headland is ″The Lookout″ built by the Government in the 1914–18 war for coastal observation and now used as holiday accommodation.

== Culture ==
In 2004, the British period drama Ladies in Lavender starring Judi Dench and Maggie Smith was filmed there.

=== International Musicians Seminar ===
The International Musicians Seminar (IMS) Prussia Cove held at Porth-en-Alls was founded by the Hungarian violinist, Sándor Végh and Hilary Tunstall-Behrens in 1972. The master class seminars are said to be "... an opportunity to broaden their (students) musical horizons and to make new contacts; stimuli which are vital to a developing artist". Former students and participants of the seminars are to be found among the world's leading soloists and leaders of the great orchestras of the world. Musicians play a series of spring and autumn concerts in local venues such as St Pol de Léon's Church, Paul and St Buryan's Church.

== See also ==
- Carters of Prussia Cove
