= National Infrastructure Pipeline =

Infrastructure project in India

- India Investment Grid (IIG) logo
- Duration: 2020—2025
- Sanctioned: ₹1.97 lakh crore (US$1.4 trillion)
- Total Capital Outlay (Dec 2020): USD 1,781.47 billion
- Projects (Dec 2020): 7,400

The National Infrastructure Pipeline (NIP) is a group of social and economic infrastructure projects in India over a period of five years with an initial sanctioned amount of ₹102 lakh crore (equivalent to ₹130 trillion or US$1.4 trillion in 2026). The pipeline was first made public by the Prime Minister of India Narendra Modi during his 2019 Independence Day speech.

Real time data and details related to NIP can be found online at the India Investment Grid website which was launched in August 2020.

== Task force report ==
The task force headed by Atanu Chakraborty, the economic affairs secretary in the finance ministry, on National Infrastructure Pipeline, in May 2020, submitted its final report to the Finance Minister. Important recommendations and observations made:

- Investment needed: ₹111 lakh crore (equivalent to ₹140 trillion or US$1.5 trillion in 2026) over the next five years (2020-2025) to build infrastructure projects and drive economic growth.
- Energy, roads, railways and urban projects are estimated to account for the bulk of projects (around 70%).
- The Centre (39 percent) and state (40 percent) are expected to have an almost equal share in implementing the projects, while the private sector has 21 percent share. Aggressive push towards asset sales.
- Monetisation of infrastructure assets. Setting up of development finance institutions.
- Strengthening the municipal bond market.

The task force has recommended setting up of the following three committees: Committee to monitor NIP progress and eliminate delays. Steering Committee at each Infrastructure ministry level to follow up on the implementation process. Steering Committee in DEA for raising financial resources for the NIP.

== India Investment Grid ==
In August 2020, the Union Minister for Finance and Corporate Affairs launched the India Investment Grid website which provides "Information on large-scale government infrastructure projects as an aid to investors, lenders and companies bidding for work. The grid is designed to give real-time updates on the implementation of the National Infrastructure Pipeline (NIP)."

== National Monetisation Pipeline ==
National Monetisation Pipeline (NMP) is Government of India's monetisation framework for Government assets including roadways, railways and airports, power transmission lines, energy and renewable energy related assets, warehousing and sport-related assets.
