= Peg (unit) =

Unit of volume used in measuring alcoholic drinks

A peg is a unit of volume, typically used to measure amounts of liquor in the Indian subcontinent. In India, pegs are traditionally used instead of shots to measure spirits.

The terms "large (bara) peg" and "small (chota) peg" are equal to 60 ml (2 US fl oz) and 30 ml (1 US fl oz), respectively, with "peg" alone simply referring to a 60 ml (2 US fl oz) peg.

Bollywood films and songs also reference the patiala peg measuring 120 ml (4 US fl oz), or four standard pegs.
