= Nipperkin =

Unit of measurement of volume

The nipperkin is a unit of measurement of volume, equal to one-half of a quarter-gill, one-eighth of a gill, or one thirty-second of an English pint. In other estimations, one nip (an abbreviation that originated in 1796) is either one-third of a pint, or any amount less than or equal to half a pint. A nipperkin is also one-eighth of a pint of beer or any other liquor. The name has been also used as inspiration for drinking dens and bars around England, with the most notable being “The Nipperkin” in Mayfair, London. Additionally, especially in New England, miniature bottles of alcohol are often referred to as "nips".

== See also ==
- "The Barley Mow (song)”
