= Gill (unit) =

Unit of volume with different values

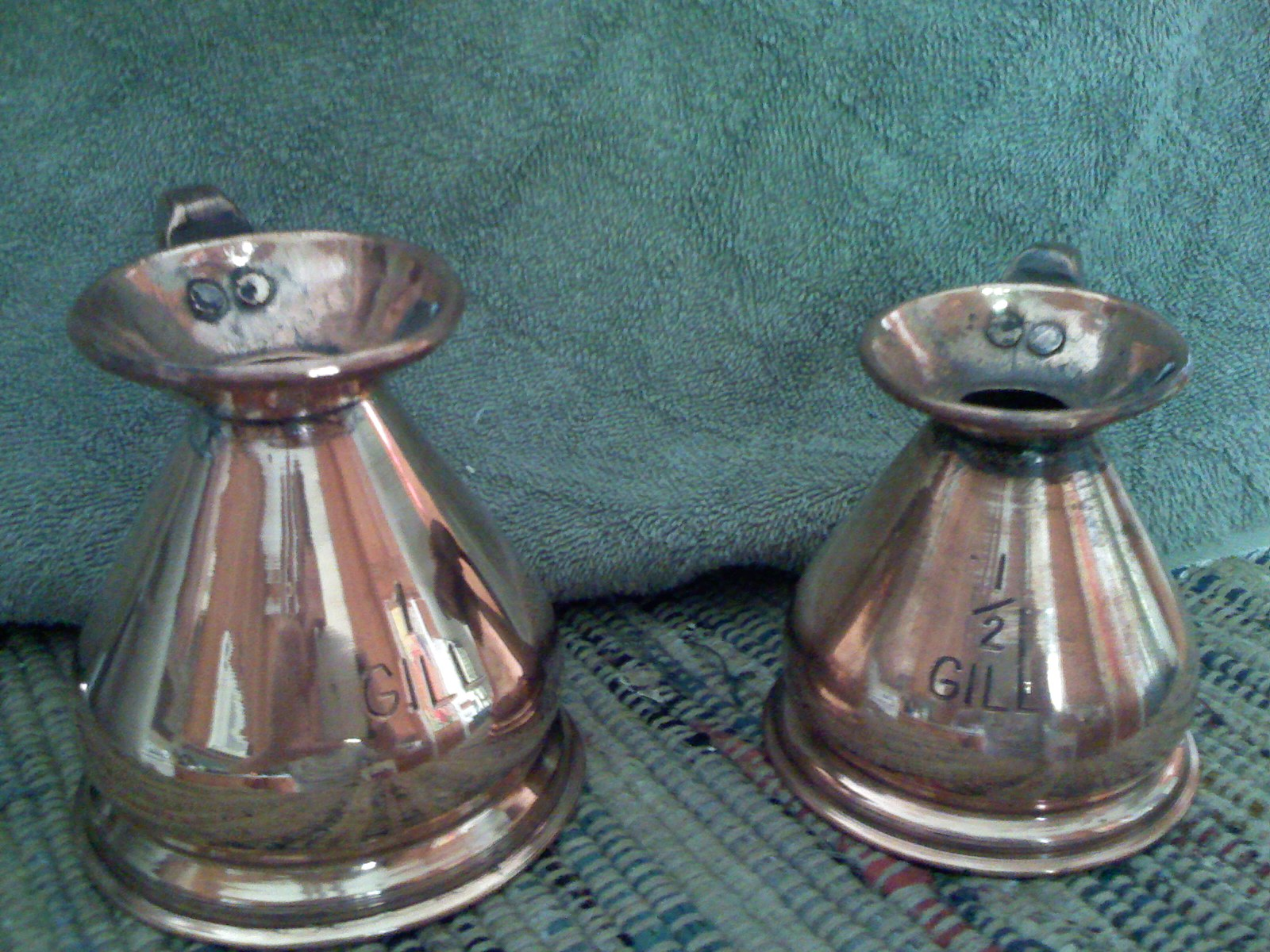
Copper gill-measuring jugs

The gill (/ˈdʒɪl/ JILL) or teacup is a unit of measurement for volume equal to a quarter of a pint. It is no longer in common use, except in regard to the volume of alcoholic spirits measures.

== Imperial ==
In imperial units

1 imperial gill	≡ 5 imperial fluid ounces
	≡ 1/32 imperial gallon
	≡ 1/8 imperial quart
	≡ 1/4 imperial pint
	≡ 1/2 imperial cup
	≡ 10 tablespoons
	≡ 40 Imperial fluid drams
	≡ 142.0653125 ml (Note: after 1964 in Canada, 1976 in the UK)
	≈ 4.8038 U.S. fluid ounces
	≈ 0.0375297 US gallons
	≈ 0.3002375 US pints
	≈ 0.600475 US cups
	≈ 1.20095 US gills
	≈ 9.6076 US tablespoons
	≈ 28.8228 US teaspoons
	≈ 38.4304 US fluid drams
	≈ 8.6693573 cubic inches
	≈ 0.1290071 US dry quarts
	≈ 0.2580142 US dry pints

== United States ==
In United States customary units

1 US gill	≡ 4 US fluid ounces
	≡ 1/32 US gallon
	≡ 1/8 US liquid quart
	≡ 1/4 US liquid pint
	≡ 1/2 US cup
	≡ 8 US tablespoons
	≡ 24 US teaspoons
	≡ 32 US fluid drams
	≡ 118.29411825 mL (Note: after 1964 redefinition of litre and 1959 redefinition of inch)
	≈ 4.1633709 imperial fluid ounces
	≈ 0.0260211 imperial gallons
	≈ 0.1040843 imperial quarts
	≈ 0.2081685 imperial pints
	≈ 0.8326742 imperial gills
	≈ 0.41633709 imperial cups
	≈ 6.66139348 imperial tablespoons
	≈ 33.3069674 imperial fluid drams
	≡ 7.21875 cubic inches
	≡ 11550/107521 US dry quart
	≡ 23100/107521 US dry pint

== United Kingdom ==
Prior to metrication in the United Kingdom, the standard single measure of spirits in a pub was 1/6 gill (23.7 mL) in England and Wales, either 1/5 gill (28.4 mL) or 1/4 gill (35.5 mL) in Scotland, and 1/4 gill (35.5 mL) in Northern Ireland. After metrication, this was replaced by measures of either 25 or 35 millilitres (0.176 or 0.246 gi), at the discretion of the proprietor.

Half of a gill is a jack, or one-eighth of a pint. In northern England, a quarter pint could also be called a jack or a noggin, rather than a gill, and in some areas a half-pint could be called a gill, particularly for beer and milk.

In Scotland, there were additional sizes:

- big gill = 1 1/2 gills (213.1 mL)
- wee gill = 3/4 gill (106.5 mL)
- wee half gill = 3/8 gill (53.3 mL)
- nip = 1/4 gill (35.5 mL)

== Ireland ==
In the Republic of Ireland, the standard spirit measure was historically 1/4 gill. It still retains this value, though it is now legally specified in metric units as 35.5 mL.

== Isle of Man ==
Until 2022, a spirit measure in the Isle of Man was defined as 1/5 gill (28.4 mL).

== In popular culture ==
There are occasional references to a gill in popular culture, such as in:

=== Literature ===
- In L. Frank Baum's The Patchwork Girl of Oz, one of the ingredients required for a magic spell is a gill of water from a dark well. In chapter 19, the obscure unit is used for humor including a pun with the nursery rhyme "Jack and Jill", which also involved a well.
- In George Orwell's Animal Farm, Moses the Raven is allotted a gill of beer a day after he returns, with the implication that this is part of his payment for supporting the farm leaders, the pigs.
- Dan Simmons' novel The Terror (2007) makes frequent references to gills of grog and rum.
- In Robert Louis Stevenson's Treasure Island, there are uses of the measure gill, with Israel Hands drinking a gill of brandy in the chapter "I Strike the Jolly Roger". In Stevenson's Kidnapped the protagonist, David Balfour, is "forced" "to drink about a gill" of brandy.
- In Melvyn Bragg's memoir Back in the Day, he recalls his grandfather in the pub with "a gill of bitter" in front of him.
- Ian Rankin writing as Jack Harvey Blood Hunt, Barman in the highlands tells two Englishmen that they sell whisky in quarter gills.

=== Music ===
- The cumulative song "The Barley Mow" refers to "...the pint pot, half-a-pint, gill, half-a-gill, quarter-gill...".
- The traditional English folk song "Byker Hill" begins with the words, "If I had another penny, I would have another gill."
- The Fall's song "Edinburgh Man" contains the line "Keep me away from the Festival and just give me a warm quarter-gill."

=== Television ===
- A gill is also referenced in Archer season 2, episode 3 ("Blood Test") when Barry explains to Archer that a liter of blood is, "about 8 gills". (Eight gills would be 32 US fl oz, or 0.95 L.) A call back reference, also discussing units of blood, is further made in season 3, episode 3 ("Heart of Archness, Part 3"). In both instances, the word is pronounced with a hard ⟨g⟩.
- In 1990's "Bart the Genius," the second episode of The Simpsons, a child tricks Bart by offering, "I'll trade you 1,000 picoliters of my milk for four gills of yours." (A picoliter is a trillionth of a liter, so Bart is losing almost a pint of milk in this exchange.)

=== Mispronunciation ===
Because of its more widely used homograph, gill has sometimes been mispronounced with a hard g sound. In English, the sound of soft ⟨g⟩ is the affricate /dʒ/, as in general, giant, and gym.

- FX's animated cartoon Archer mispronounced gill in the episodes "Blood Test" (Season 2, Episode 3) and "Heart of Archness: Part Three" (Season 3, Episode 3).
