= Anker (unit) =

An anker (usually anglicized as anchor) was a Dutch unit of capacity for wine or brandy equal to 10 US gallons that was used as a standard liquid measurement. It was most commonly used in Colonial times in New York and New Jersey, thanks to the earlier Dutch settlement of New Amsterdam (later New York City).

Many European countries had a different measurement of this unit that varied from 9 to 11 US gallons [equivalent to 7.5 to 9.25 Imperial gallons or 34 to 42 Litres].

== Conversion ==
1 Anker ≡ 10 US gallons [8.33 Imperial gallons or 37.8541 Litres]

1 Anker ≡ 0.03785411784 m^{3}
