= Miniature (alcohol) =

Small bottle of an alcoholic beverage

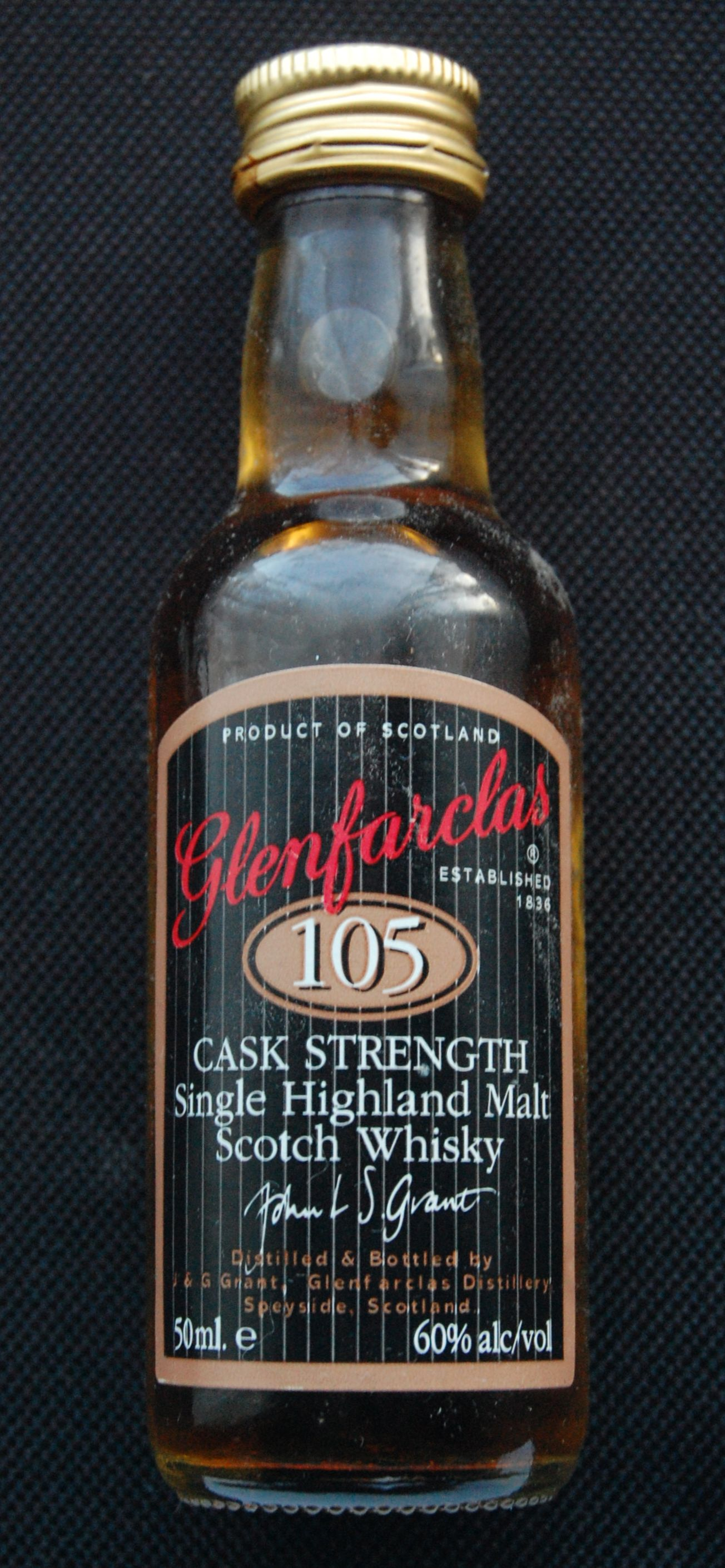
A miniature (50 ml) of Glenfarclas 105 cask-strength whisky (60% ABV). The bottle is 115 mm tall and 33 mm in diameter.

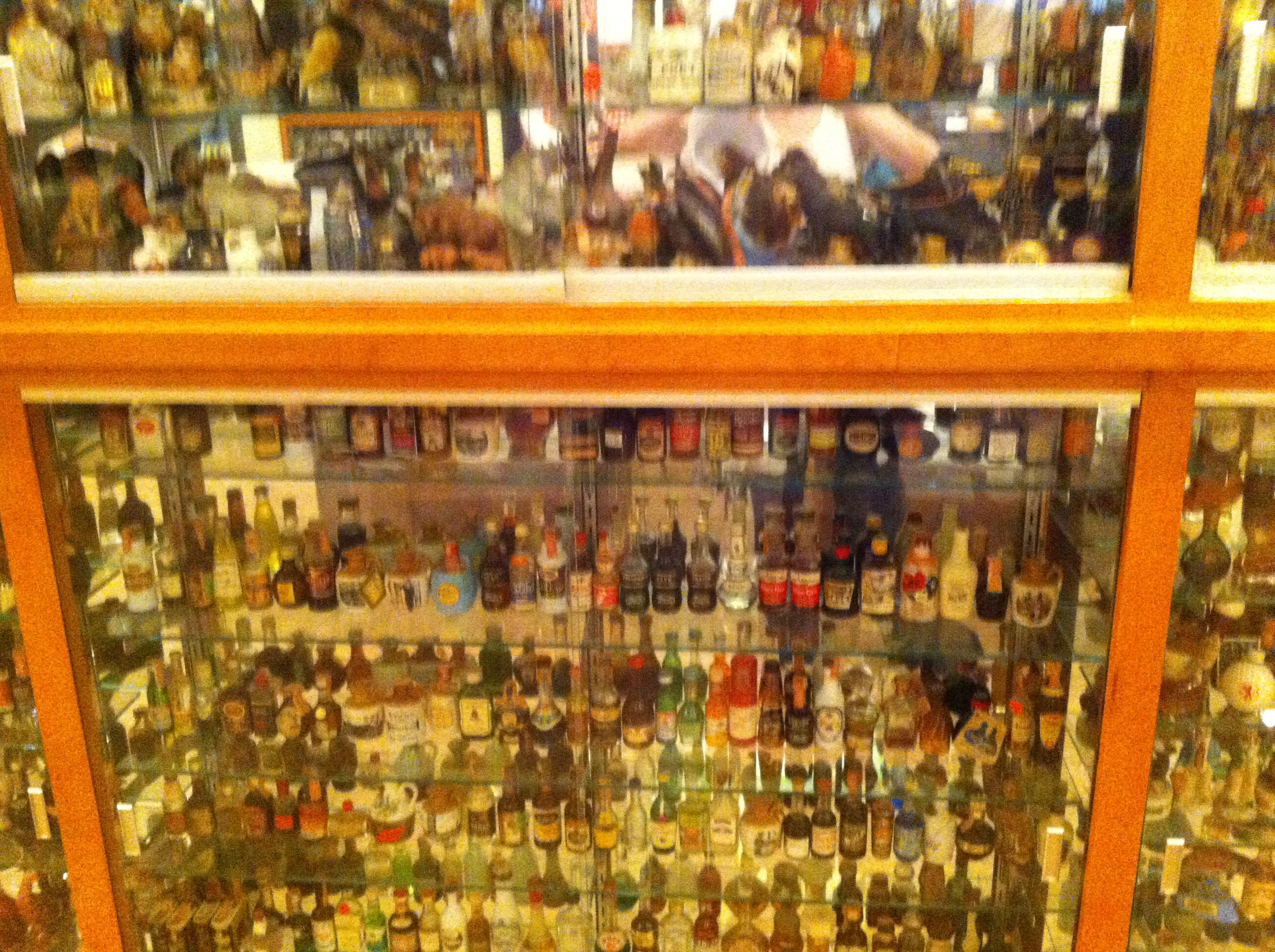
A collector's cabinet full of miniatures

A miniature is a small bottle of a spirit, liqueur or other alcoholic beverage. Its contents, typically 50 ml, are intended to comprise an individual serving.

Miniatures may be used as gifts, samples, or for promotional purposes. In Scotland and the Northeastern United States they are often known as nips (short for nipperkin), shooters, or singles and referred elsewhere as airplane bottles or mini-bar bottles or travel-sized bottles. They are sometimes available in hotel mini-bars, on trains, and planes, and in other circumstances where serving from a full size bottle is impractical or uneconomical. They are sometimes sold in sets, allowing the comparative tasting of different types of beverage. They are also sold in gift sets with a corresponding drinking glass.

Miniatures are collected by some people, with various clubs and societies serving the hobby.

Some jurisdictions that otherwise allow the sale of liquor specifically ban miniatures, to reduce litter, single-use plastic consumption, and public drunkenness by making the cheapest available alcoholic beverages more expensive.
