= Chopsticks =

Shaped pairs of sticks used as kitchen and eating utensils

- The original Chinese character for "chopsticks" (Note: Still widely used across East Asia, but in China has become archaic in most Chinese dialects except Min Chinese.)

Chinese name
- Chinese: 筷子
Transcriptions
Standard Mandarin
- Hanyu Pinyin: kuàizi
- Wade–Giles: k'uai^{4}-tzu^{5}
- IPA: [kʰwâɪ.tsɨ]
Wu
- Romanization: khuae^{去}-tsy^{上}
Hakka
- Romanization: kuai-e
Yue: Cantonese
- Yale Romanization: faai-jí
- Jyutping: faai3-zi2

Alternative Chinese name
- Chinese: 箸
Transcriptions
Standard Mandarin
- Hanyu Pinyin: zhù
Yue: Cantonese
- Jyutping: zyu^{6}
Southern Min
- Tâi-lô: tī
Eastern Min
- Fuzhou BUC: dê̤ṳ / Min Dong Chinese pronunciation: [tøy˨˦˨]

Vietnamese name
- Vietnamese alphabet: đũa
- Chữ Hán: 箸
- Chữ Nôm: 𥮊

Korean name
- Hangul: 젓가락
Transcriptions
- Revised Romanization: jeotgarak
- McCune–Reischauer: chŏkkarak

Japanese name
- Kanji: 箸
- Kana: はし
Transcriptions
- Romanization: hashi

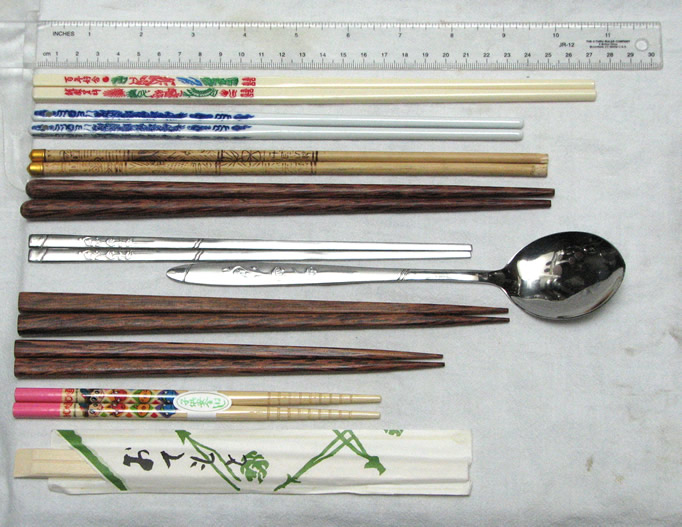
Various chopsticks and a spoon, from top to bottom, with 12-inch (30.5 cm) ruler at top for scale: Taiwanese plastic chopsticks; Chinese porcelain chopsticks; Tibetan bamboo chopsticks; Vietnamese palmwood chopsticks; Korean stainless steel flat chopsticks; Korean matching spoon in a sujeo; Japanese palmwood couple's set (two pairs); Japanese child's chopsticks; Disposable chopsticks from Japan (in paper wrapper)

Chopsticks are shaped pairs of equal-length sticks that have been used as kitchen and eating utensils in most countries of the Sinosphere for over three millennia. They are held in the dominant hand, secured by fingers, and wielded as extensions of the hand, to pick up food.

Originating in China, chopsticks later spread to other parts of the Sinosphere such as Korea, Japan and Vietnam. Chopsticks have become more accepted in connection with East Asian food in the West, especially in cities with significant East Asian diaspora communities.

Chopsticks are smoothed, and frequently tapered. They are traditionally made of wood, bamboo, metal, ivory, and ceramics, and in modern days, increasingly available in non-traditional materials such as plastic, stainless steel, and even titanium. Chopsticks are often seen as requiring practice and skill to master to be used as an eating utensil. In some countries, failing to follow etiquette in their use is frowned upon, though such feelings are generally lesser than they once were.

== Origin and history ==
Chopsticks have been around and used since at least the Shang dynasty (1766–1122 BCE). However, the Han dynasty historian Sima Qian wrote that it is likely that chopsticks were also used in the preceding Xia dynasty and even the earlier Erlitou culture, although finding archeological evidence from this era is difficult.

The earliest evidence of chopsticks uncovered so far consists of six chopsticks, made of bronze, 26 centimeters (10 in) long, and 1.1 to 1.3 centimeters (0.43 to 0.51 in) wide, excavated from the Ruins of Yin near Anyang (Henan). These are dated roughly to 1200 BC, during the Shang dynasty. They were supposed to have been used for cooking. The earliest known textual reference to the use of chopsticks comes from the Han Feizi, a philosophical text written by Han Fei (c. 280–233 BCE) in the 3rd century BCE.

The wide diffusion of chopsticks in the Chinese culture is sometimes attributed to the Confucian philosophy that emphasizes family harmony as the basis for civil order. Some modern writers have associated chopsticks with traditional Confucian values of moderation, civility, and nonviolence. For example, it is sometimes said that "knives are for warriors, but chopsticks are for scholars", a modern aphorism that reflects symbolic interpretations of dining customs. However, this phrase does not appear in any known classical Confucian texts, and there is no historical evidence that Confucius made this statement.

Similarly, a popular quote attributed to Mencius—"The honorable and upright man keeps well away from both the slaughterhouse and the kitchen ... and he allows no knives on his table"—only partially reflects classical writings. The first part is a paraphrase of a real line from the Mencius (Liang Hui Wang I), but the latter sentence is a modern addition not found in ancient texts. As such, attributions of this kind should be understood as contemporary interpretations rather than direct quotations from Confucian sources. Confucius' reference to chopsticks in his Book of Rites suggests these items were widely known in the Warring States period (c. 475–221 BCE).

=== As cooking utensils ===
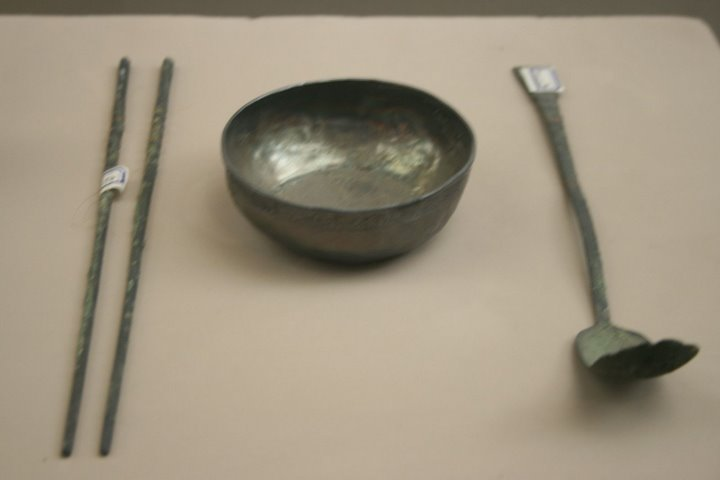
Silver chopsticks, spoon, and bowl from the Song dynasty (960–1279)

The first chopsticks were used for cooking, stirring the fire, serving or seizing bits of food, and not as eating utensils. One reason was that before the Han dynasty, millet was predominant in North China, Korea and parts of Japan. While chopsticks were used for cooking, millet porridge was eaten with spoons at that time. The use of chopsticks in the kitchen continues to this day.

Ryōribashi (料理箸) are Japanese kitchen chopsticks used in Japanese cuisine. They are used in the preparation of Japanese food, and are not designed for eating. These chopsticks allow handling of hot food with one hand, and are used like regular chopsticks. These chopsticks have a length of 30 centimeters (12 in) or more, and may be looped together with a string at the top. They are usually made from bamboo. For deep frying, however, metal chopsticks with bamboo handles are preferred, as tips of regular bamboo chopsticks become discolored and greasy after repeated use in hot oil. The bamboo handles protect against heat.

Similarly, Vietnamese cooks use Đũa cả ( 𥮊奇) or "grand chopsticks" in cooking, and for serving rice from the pot.

=== As cooking thermometers ===
When a wetted end of a wooden chopstick is dipped into cooking oil, a sizzling sound due to bubbles bursting indicates that the temperature is suitable for deep-frying. Instead, loud popping or crackling implies that the temperature is too high, whereas silence implies that it is too low.

=== As eating utensils ===
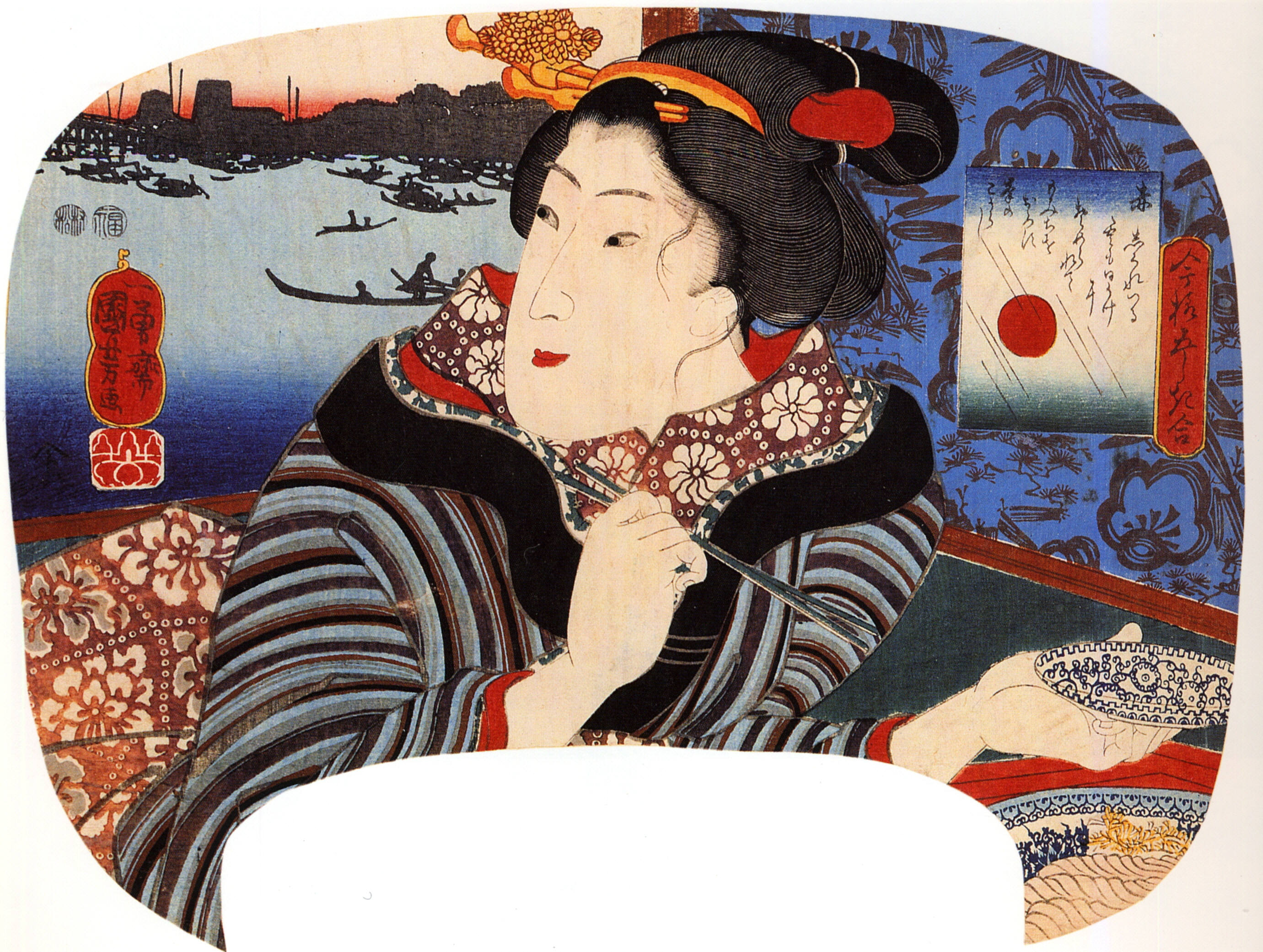
A painting of a Japanese woman using chopsticks, by Utagawa Kuniyoshi

Chopsticks began to be used as eating utensils during the Han dynasty, as rice consumption increased. During this period, spoons continued to be used alongside chopsticks as eating utensils at meals. It was not until the Ming dynasty that chopsticks came into exclusive use for both serving and eating. They then acquired the name kuaizi and the present shape.

=== Propagation throughout the world ===
The use of chopsticks as both cooking and eating utensils spread throughout East and Southeast Asia over time. Scholars such as Isshiki Hachiro and Lynn White have noted how the world was split among three dining customs, or food cultural spheres. There are those that eat with their fingers, those that use forks and knives, and then there is the "chopsticks cultural sphere", consisting of China, Japan, Korea, and Vietnam.

As Han Chinese emigration percolated, they spread the usage of chopsticks as eating utensils to South and Southeast Asian countries including Brunei, Cambodia, Laos, Nepal, Malaysia, Myanmar, Singapore and Thailand. In Singapore and Malaysia, the Han Chinese traditionally consume all food with chopsticks, while ethnic Indians and Malays (especially in Singapore) use chopsticks primarily to consume noodle dishes. Overall, the use of either chopsticks, a spoon, or a fork, is interchangeable in these regions. In Laos, Myanmar, Thailand and Nepal chopsticks are generally used only to consume noodles.

Similarly, chopsticks have become more accepted in connection with East Asian cuisine around the world, in Hawaii, the West Coast of North America, and cities with Overseas Asian communities all around the globe.

The earliest European reference to chopsticks comes in the Portuguese Suma Oriental by Tomé Pires, who wrote in 1515 in Malacca: "They [the Chinese] eat with two sticks and the earthenware or china bowl in their left hand close to the mouth, with the two sticks to suck in. This is the Chinese way."

=== Naming in different countries ===
In ancient written Chinese, the character for chopsticks was zhu (箸; Middle Chinese reconstruction: d̪jwo-). Although it may have been widely used in ancient vernacular Chinese, its use was eventually replaced by the pronunciation for the character kuài (快), meaning "quick". The original character, though still used in writing, is rarely used in modern spoken Mandarin. It, however, is preserved in Chinese languages such as Hokkien and Teochew, as the Min Chinese languages are directly descended from Old Chinese rather than Middle Chinese.

The Standard Chinese term for chopsticks is kuàizi (筷子). The first character (筷) is a phono-semantic compound created with a phonetic part meaning "quick" (快), and a semantic part meaning "bamboo" (竹), using the radical (⺮).

The English word "chopstick" has been claimed to have derived from Chinese Pidgin English, in which chop chop meant "quickly". Another claim is that the term is derived from chow (or chow chow), which is also a pidgin word stemming from Southeast Asia meaning "food". However, according to the Oxford English Dictionary, the earliest published use of the word is in the 1699 book Voyages and Descriptions by William Dampier: "they are called by the English seamen Chopsticks" which predates Chinese Pidgin English by centuries and invalidates the first two conjectures due to chronological impossibility.

In Tibetan, chopsticks are called "kho-ze" ཁོ་ཙེ.

In Japanese, chopsticks are called hashi (箸). A common misconception is that they are referred as otemoto (おてもと), a phrase commonly on the wrappers of disposable chopsticks. Te means hand and moto means the area under or around something. The preceding o is used for politeness. Otemoto therefore can refer to any small plate or serving utensil placed at a serving table.

In Okinawan, chopsticks are called mēshi (めーし) as a vulgar word, umēshi (うめーし) as a polite word, or 'nmēshi ぅんめーし(御箸, ʔNmeesi). A special type of chopsticks made from the himehagi (Polygala japonica) stem is called sōrō 'nmēshi (そーろーぅんめーし, sooroo ʔNmeesi精霊御箸). These are used at altars of offerings in Kyū Bon (old Bon Festival).

In Korean, 저 (箸, jeo) is used in the compound jeotgarak (젓가락), which is composed of jeo ("chopsticks") and garak ("stick"). Jeo cannot be used alone, but can be found in other compounds such as sujeo (수저; "spoon and chopsticks").

In Taiwanese Hokkien, which is derived from Hokkien, chopsticks are called tī, written as 箸.

In Vietnamese, chopsticks are called đũa, which is written as 箸 in Chữ Nôm. Đũa is the non-Sino-Vietnamese reading of 箸. An alternative character is 𥮊.

In Mongolian, chopsticks are called savkh which is written as савх in Cyrillic and as ᠰᠠᠤᠬᠠ in the Mongolian script.

In Cambodian (Khmer), chopsticks are called chang keuh (ចង្កឹះ).

In Indonesian, chopsticks are called sumpit, from Baba Malay sumpit, from Hokkien 栓筆／栓笔 (sng-pit, “holding pin”). In Borneo, bamboo chopsticks are called candas. In Malaysia they may be called penyepit.

== Styles of chopsticks ==
=== Common characteristics ===
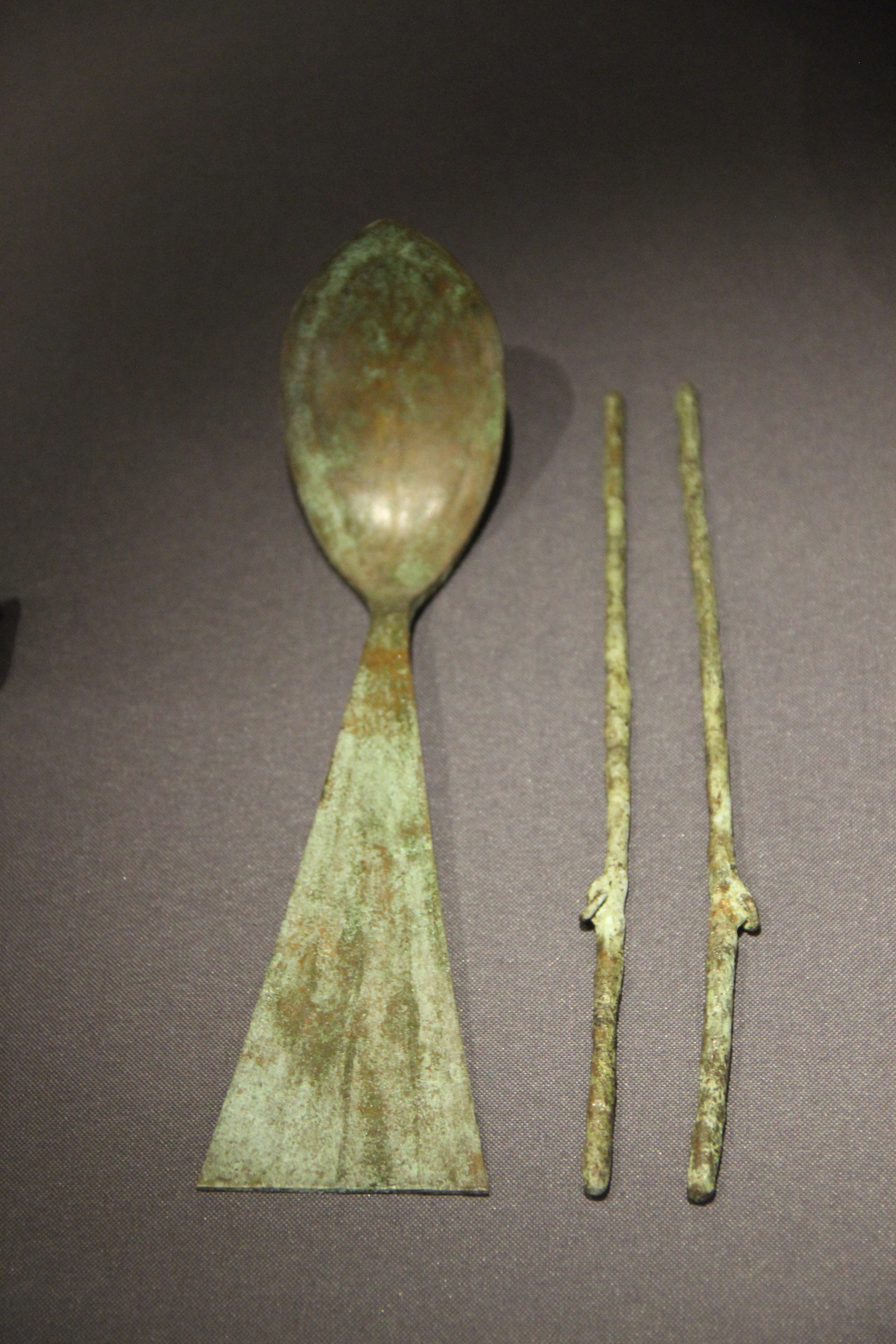
Bronze Sujeo set from the Baekje Kingdom period (18 BC–660 CE)

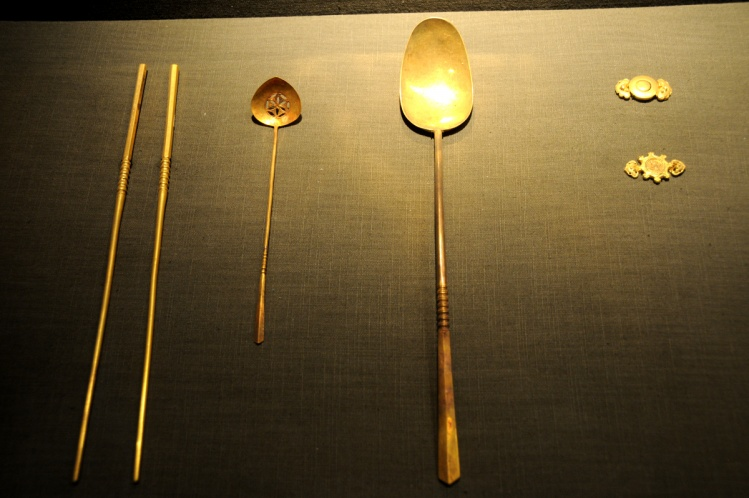
A pair of gold chopsticks and two gold spoons found in the tomb of Prince Zhu Zhanji of Ming (1411–1441)

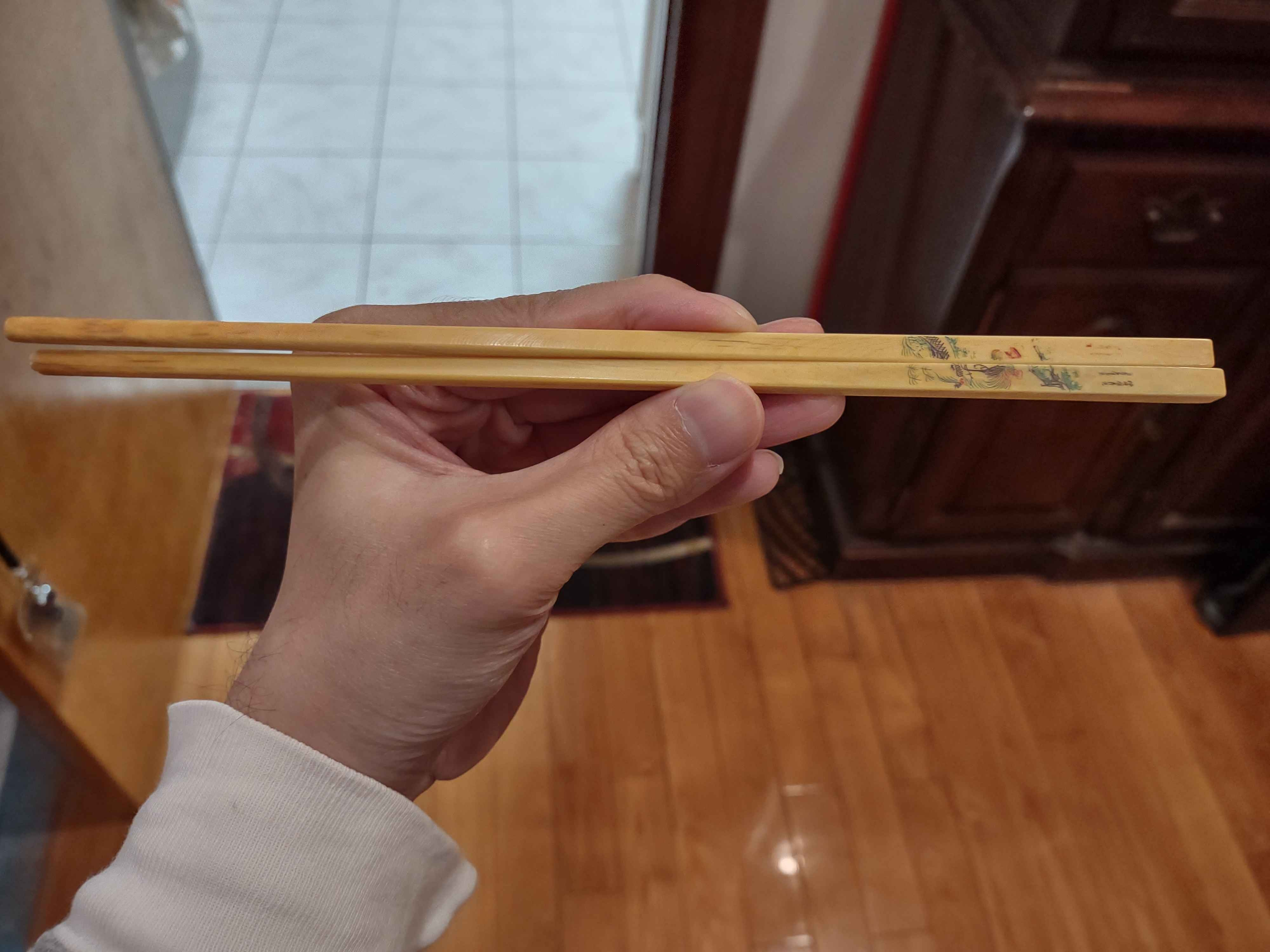
Example of ivory chopsticks made prior to the ivory ban in Asia

Chopsticks come in a wide variety of styles, with differences in geometry and material. Depending on the country and the region some chopstick styles are more common than others.

- Length: Chopsticks range from 23 to 26 centimeters (9–10 in) long, tapering to one end. Very long, large chopsticks, usually about 30 to 40 centimeters (12–16 in), are used for cooking, especially for deep frying foods.
- Cross-section: Chopsticks may have round, square, hexagonal, or other polygonal cross-sections. Usually the edges are rounded off so there are no sharp 90° surface angles in square chopsticks. Korean chopsticks are notable for having flat handles, instead of regular full bodies as in Chinese, Vietnamese and Japanese chopsticks.
- Taper: Chopsticks are usually tapered in the end used for picking up food. Chinese and Vietnamese chopsticks are more commonly blunt, while Japanese ones tend to be sharp and pointed in style. Korean chopsticks typically have sharp tapers.
- Tips: Some chopsticks have a rough surface for the tip end, to provide better friction for gripping food. The gripping surfaces may be carved as circumferential grooves, or provided as a rough texture.
- Material: A large variety of materials is available, including bamboo, wood, plastic, metal, bone, jade, porcelain, and ivory.
  - Bamboo and wooden chopsticks are relatively inexpensive, low in thermal conduction, and provide good grip for holding food. They can warp and deteriorate with continued use if they are of the unvarnished or unlacquered variety. Almost all cooking and disposable chopsticks are made of bamboo or wood. Disposable unlacquered chopsticks are used especially in restaurants. These often come as a piece of wood that is partially cut and must be split into two chopsticks by the user (serving as proof that they have not been previously used). In Japanese, these disposable implements are known as waribashi (割り箸)
  - Plastic chopsticks are relatively inexpensive, low in thermal conduction, and resistant to wear. Melamine is one of the more commonly used plastics for chopsticks. Plastic chopsticks are not as effective as wood and bamboo for picking up food, because they tend to be slippery. Also, plastic chopsticks cannot be used for cooking, since high temperatures may damage the chopsticks and produce toxic compounds.
  - Metal chopsticks are durable and easy to clean, but present a slippery surface. Stainless steel is a common metal used to make chopsticks, but titanium chopsticks can be purchased at prices comparable to a good pair of wooden chopsticks. Silver is still common among wealthy families, and as part of gift sets.
  - Other materials such as ivory, jade, gold, and silver are typically chosen for luxury. Silver-tipped chopsticks were often used as a precaution by wealthy people, based on the myth that silver would turn black upon contact with poison.
- Embellishments: Wooden or bamboo chopsticks can be painted or lacquered for decoration and waterproofing. Metal chopsticks are sometimes roughened or scribed to make them less slippery. Higher-priced metal chopstick pairs are sometimes connected by a short chain at the untapered end to prevent their separation.

=== Sinosphere ===
==== China ====
Chinese chopsticks tend to be longer than other styles, at about 27 centimeters (11 in). They are thicker, with squared or rounded cross-sections. They end in either wide, blunt, flat tips or tapered pointed tips. Blunt tips are more common with plastic or melamine varieties, whereas pointed tips are more common in wood and bamboo varieties. Chinese restaurants more commonly offer melamine chopsticks for its durability and ease of sanitation. Within individual household, bamboo chopsticks are more commonly found.

==== Japan ====
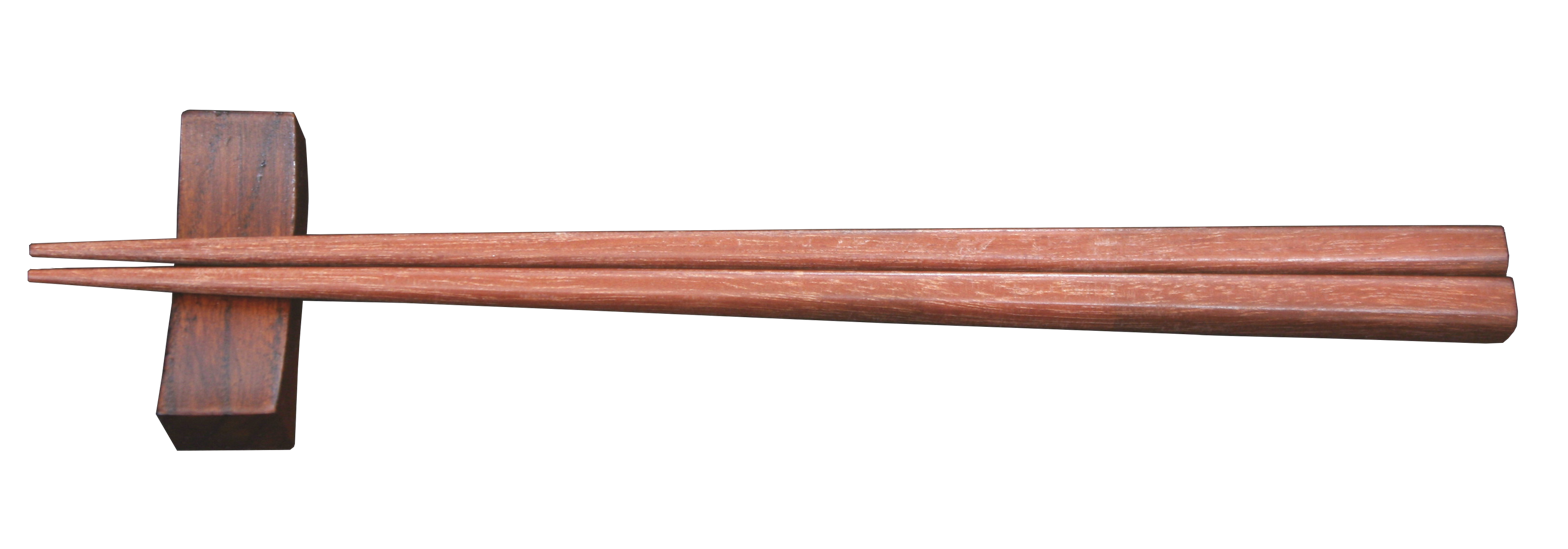
Chopsticks made of Japanese yew wood, on a chopstick rest

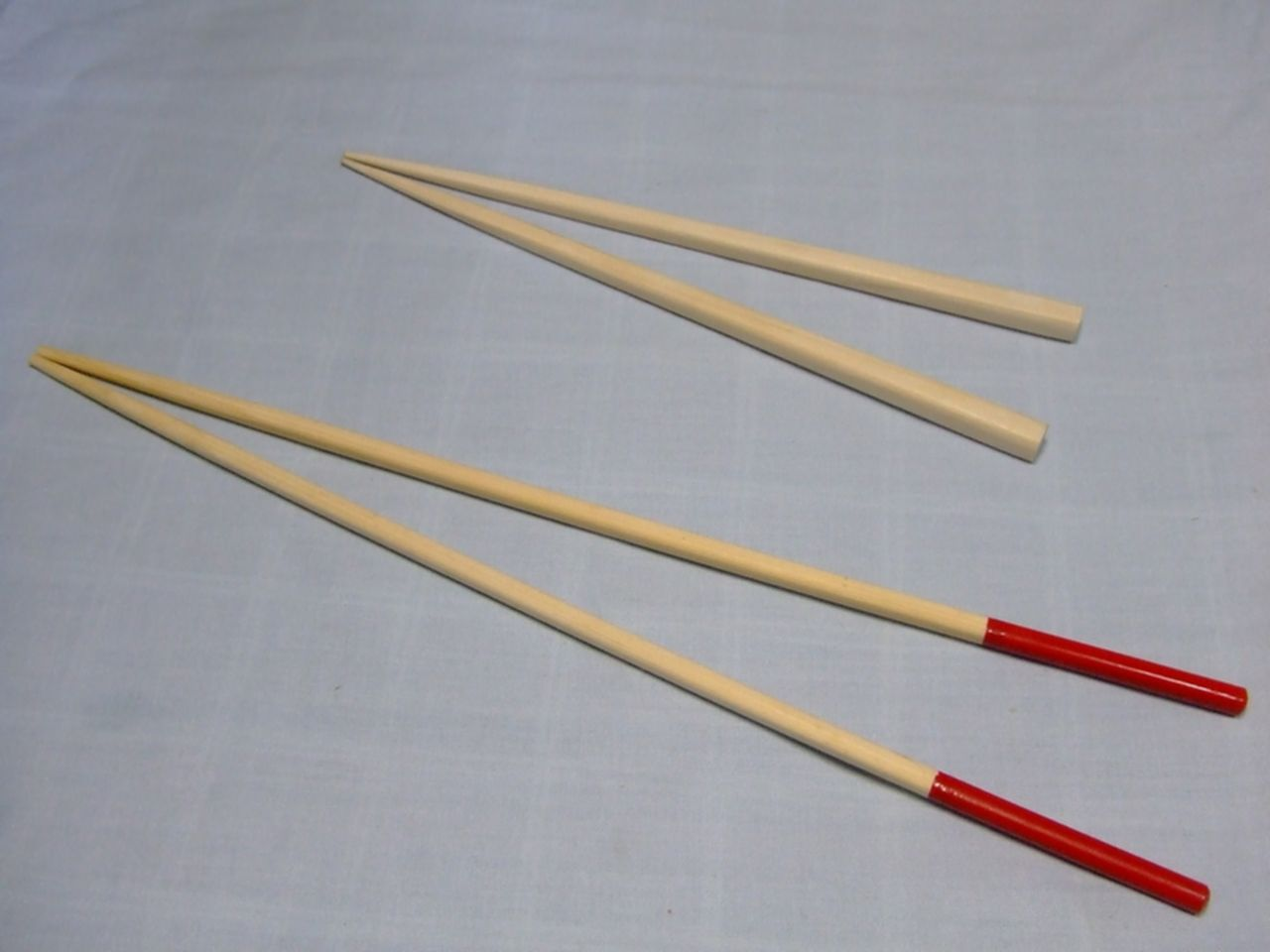
Hashi (for eating) and saibashi (for cooking, shown below)

It is common for Japanese sticks to be of shorter length for women, and children's chopsticks in smaller sizes are common. Many Japanese chopsticks have circumferential grooves at the eating end, which helps prevent food from slipping. Japanese chopsticks are typically sharp and pointed, in order to dissect fish and seafood. They are traditionally made of wood or bamboo, and are lacquered.

Lacquered chopsticks are known in Japanese as nuribashi, in several varieties, depending on where they are made and what types of lacquers are used in glossing them. Japanese traditional lacquered chopsticks are produced in the city of Obama in Fukui Prefecture, and come in many colors coated in natural lacquer. They are decorated with mother-of-pearl from abalone, and with eggshell to impart a waterproof coating to the chopsticks, extending their life.

Edo Kibashi chopsticks have been made by Tokyo craftspeople since the beginning of the Taishō period (1912–1926) roughly 100 years ago. These chopsticks use high-grade wood (ebony, red sandalwood, ironwood, Japanese box-trees, or maple), which craftspeople plane by hand. Edo Kibashi chopsticks may be pentagonal, hexagonal or octagonal in cross-section. The tips of these chopsticks are rounded to prevent damage to the dish or the bowl.

In Japan, chopsticks for cooking are known as ryoribashi (料理箸 りょうりばし), and as saibashi (菜箸 さいばし) when used to transfer cooked food to the dishes it will be served in.

==== Korea ====
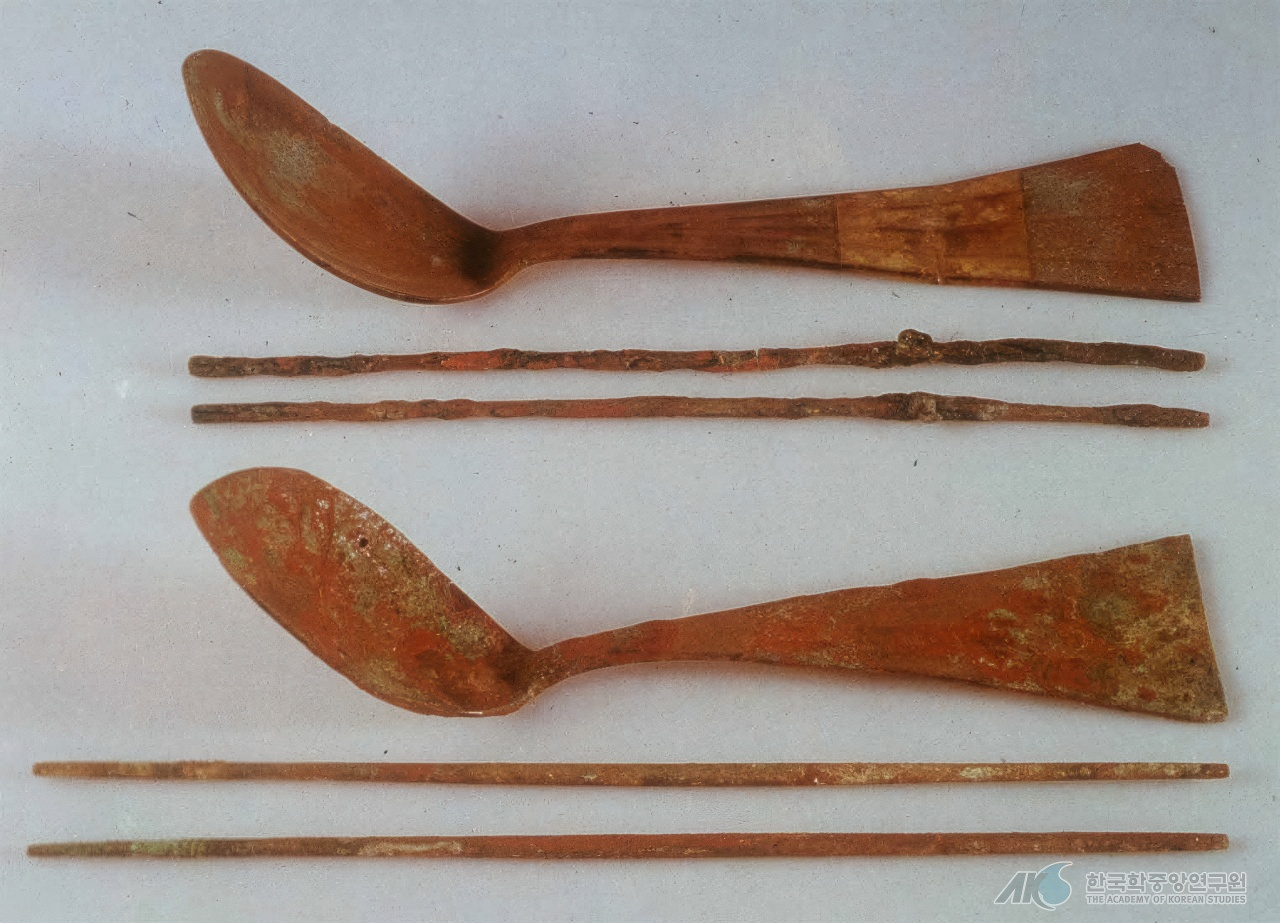
Bronze spoons and chopstick sets of different designs excavated from the tomb of King Muryeong of Baekje (501–523)

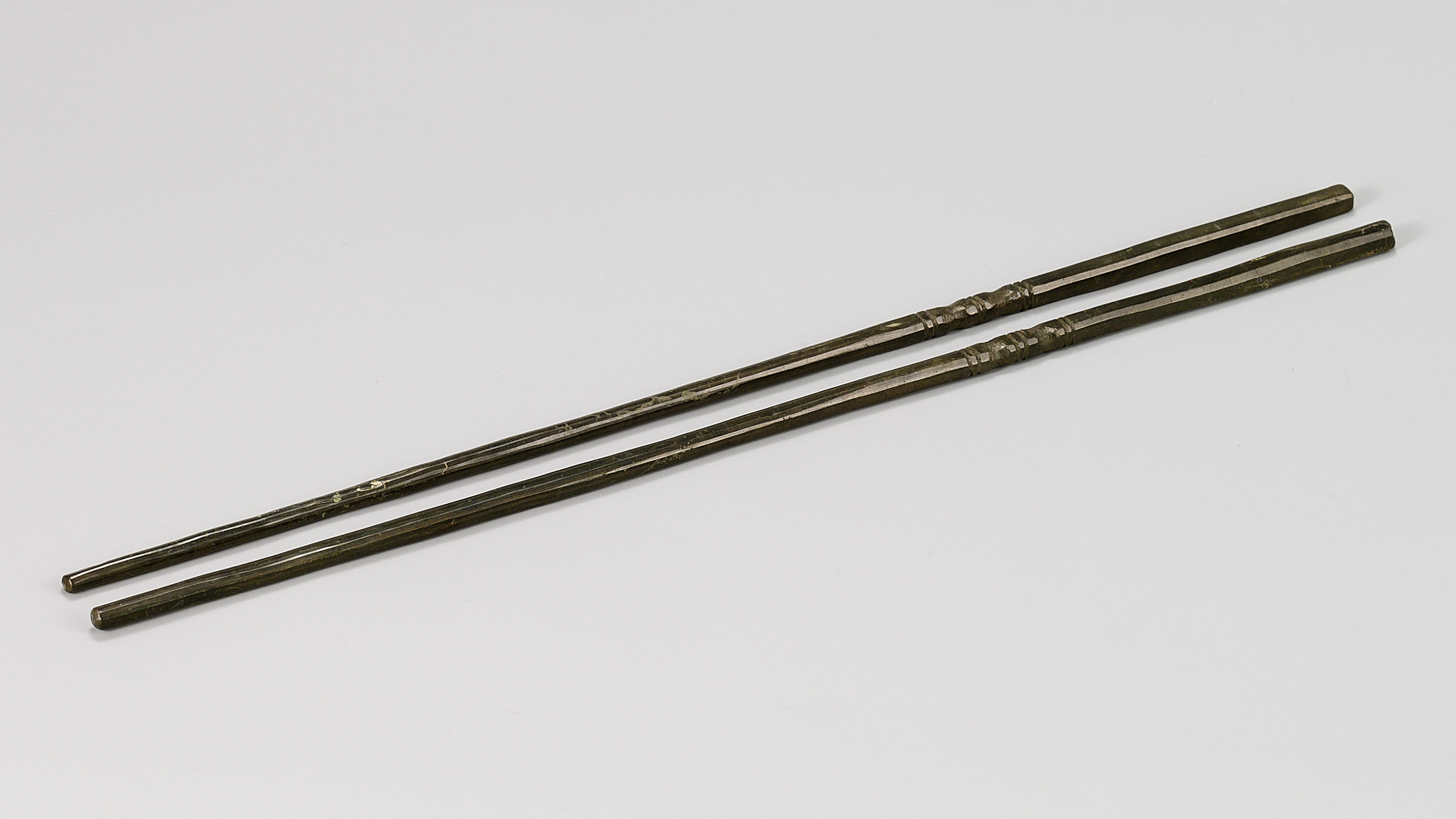
Bronze chopsticks (Goryeo dynasty, 918–1392)

The earliest uses of chopsticks in Korea seem to date back to the Three Kingdoms of Korea with the oldest chopsticks excavated from the royal tomb of Baekje. Chopsticks used by Koreans are often made of metal. It is believed that the uses of metallic chopsticks evolved from the royal practice of using silver chopsticks to detect poison in food, but the exact reason is debated. Depending on the historical era, the metallic composition of Korean chopsticks varied. In the past, such as during the Goryeo era, chopsticks were made of bronze. During the Joseon era, chopsticks used by royalty were made of silver, as its oxidizing properties could often be used to detect whether or not food intended for royals had been tampered with. In the present day, the majority of Korean metal chopsticks are made of stainless steel. Due to metal's slippery nature, the chopsticks are stamped flat for better gripping. High-end sets, such as those intended as gifts, are often made of sterling silver. Chopsticks made of varying woods (typically bamboo) are also common in Korea. Many Korean chopsticks are ornately decorated at the grip.

In North and South Korea, chopsticks of medium-length with a small, flat rectangular shape are paired with a spoon, made of the same material. The set is called sujeo, a portmanteau of the Korean words for spoon and chopsticks. This (the historical extensive use of a spoon in addition to chopsticks) is also a feature unique to Korea; most chopstick-using countries have either eliminated the use of spoons, or have limited their use as eating utensils. It is traditional to rest sujeo on spoon and chopstick rest, so chopsticks and the spoon do not touch the table surface.

In the past, materials for sujeo varied with social class: Sujeo used in the court were made with gold, silver, or cloisonné, while commoners used brass or wooden sujeo. Today, sujeo is usually made with stainless steel, although bangjja is also popular in more traditional settings.

==== Vietnam ====
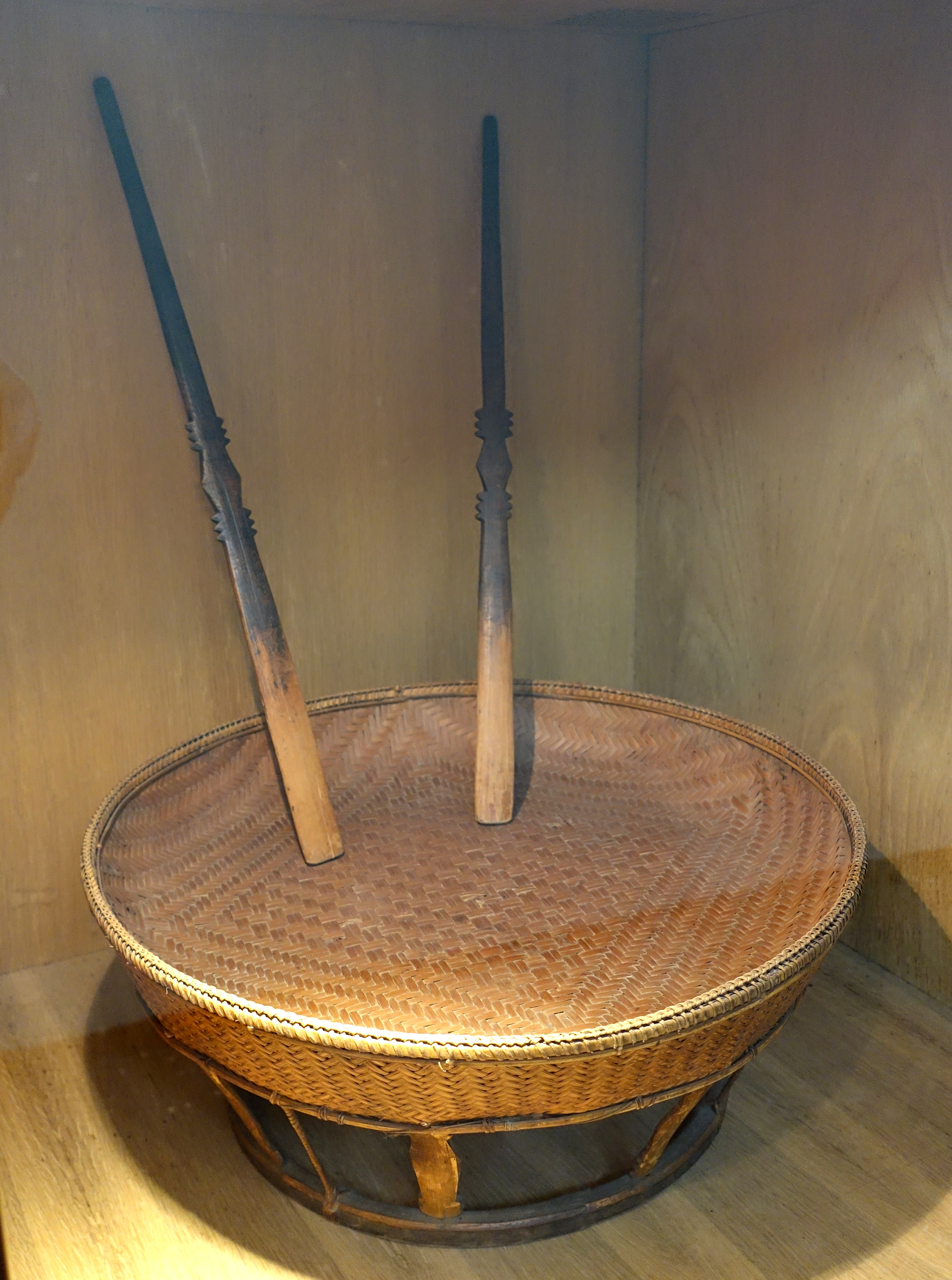
Đũa cả, a type of Vietnamese chopsticks used to scoop rice. In the photo is the Đũa cả artifact of the Chứt people.

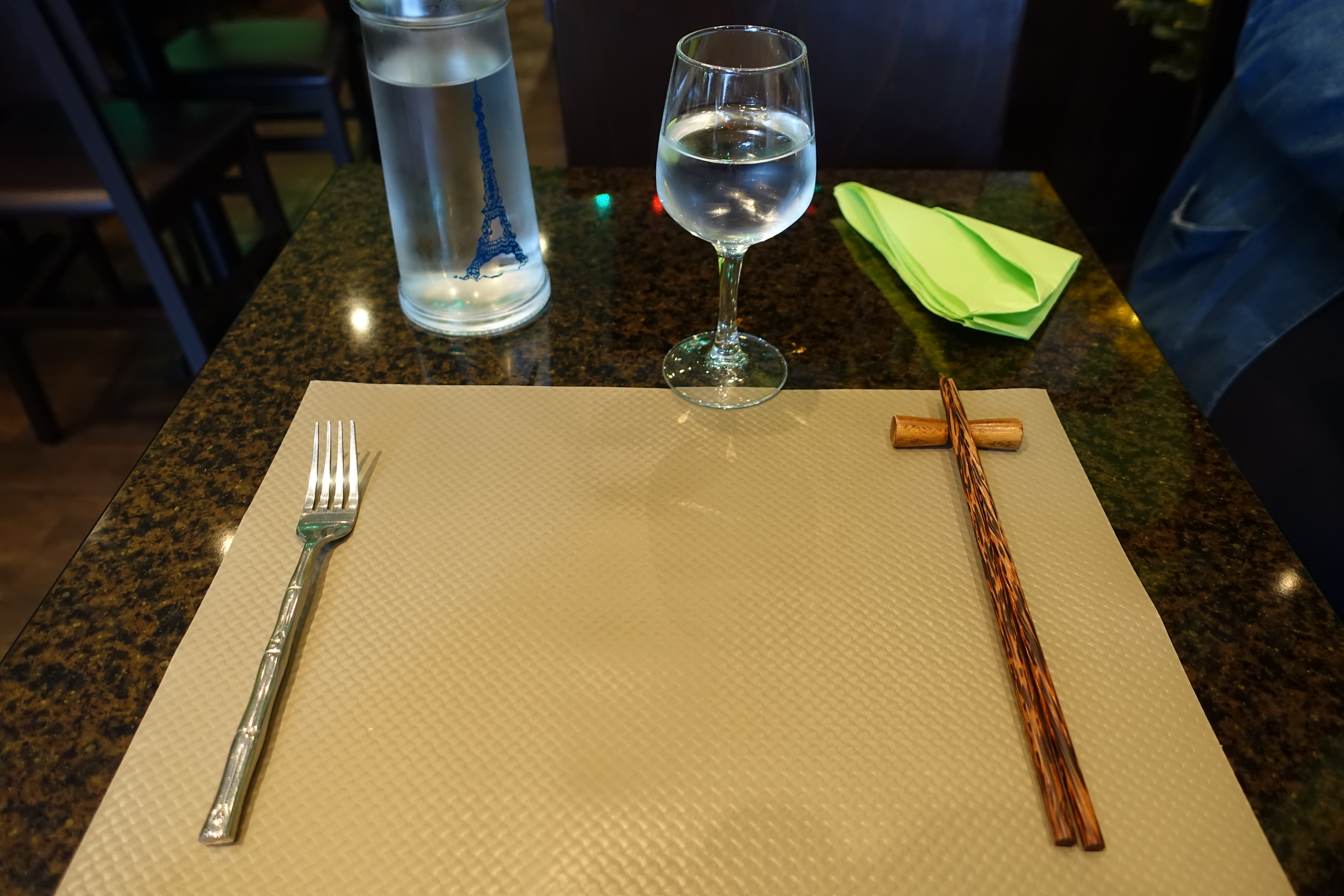
Forks and chopsticks at a Vietnamese restaurant in France

Vietnamese chopsticks are long sticks that taper to a blunt point. They are usually big and thick at one end and thinner at the other, thin ends are often used to pick up food. They are traditionally made of bamboo or lacquered wood. Today, plastic chopsticks are also used due to their durability. However, bamboo or wooden chopsticks are often more used in the village countryside. Vietnam has a number of specialized chopsticks for cooking and stirring rice such as đũa cả (lit. main chopsticks) are large, flat chopsticks used to serve rice from a pot and there is a specialized type of chopsticks for stir-frying, they are usually 10–20 cm longer than normal chopsticks called đũa nấu (lit. chopsticks for cooking).

=== Outside of Sinosphere ===
==== Mongolia ====
Mongolian chopsticks were usually made of bones, and their tips were covered with silver, every rich man kept the chopsticks in a sheath. At the same time, sticks were not often used directly for eating, being, for the most part, an element of decor and confirmation of the status of the carrier. Apart from the Khalkha Mongols and Mongols from Inner Mongolia of China, chopsticks have also been found in old traditional Buryat and Kalmyk knives' sets.

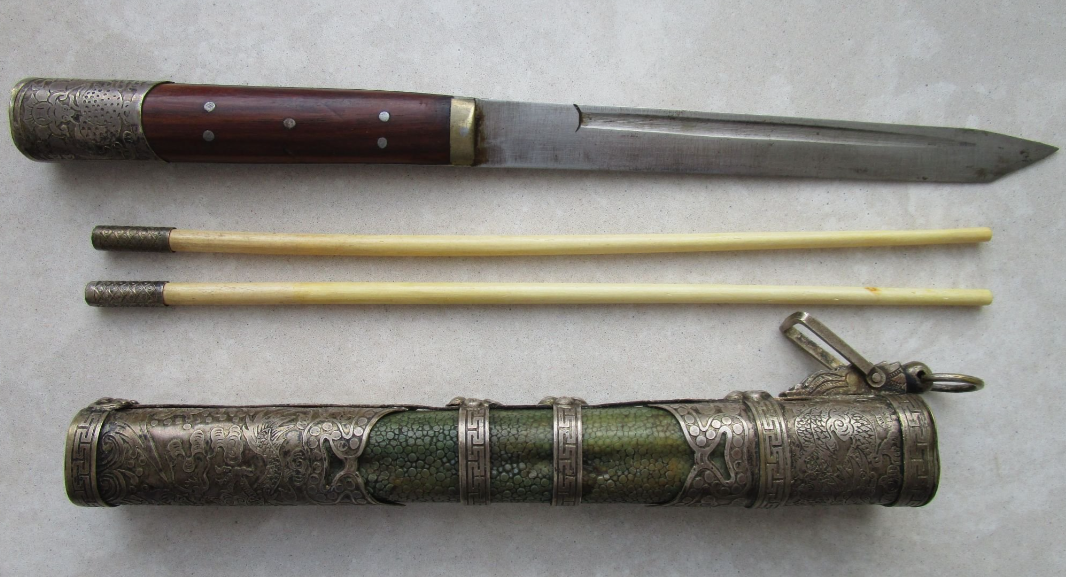
Mongolian knife set

Later, the Mongols also adopted chopsticks for dining. Archaeological evidence from the 1970s to late 1980s reveals murals in two tombs—likely belonging to either Khitan or Mongol nobility—depicting a serving maid holding a large bowl in her left hand and a pair of chopsticks in her right, as if preparing to stir food for her master. These findings demonstrate that after conquering China in the late 13th century, the Mongols gradually assimilated chopsticks into their culinary customs, blending them with traditional nomadic utensils like knives.

==== Thailand ====
Historically, Thais tended to use their hands when eating their native cuisine. Ethnic Chinese immigrants introduced chopsticks for foods that require them. Restaurants serving other Asian cuisines that utilize chopsticks use the style of chopstick, if any, appropriate for that cuisine. Fork and spoon, adopted from the West, are now the most commonly used.

==== Borneo/Malaysia/Indonesia etc. ====
In Malay-speaking countries, there may be several names for chopsticks. In Borneo, bamboo chopsticks called candas are used to eat ambuyat or linut in Borneo, a native staple food of glutinous porridge made from sago. A pair of candas is typically adjoined at the back. In Indonesian chopsticks may be called sumpit. In Malaysia they may be called penyepit.

== Using chopsticks ==
A sample of alternative grips

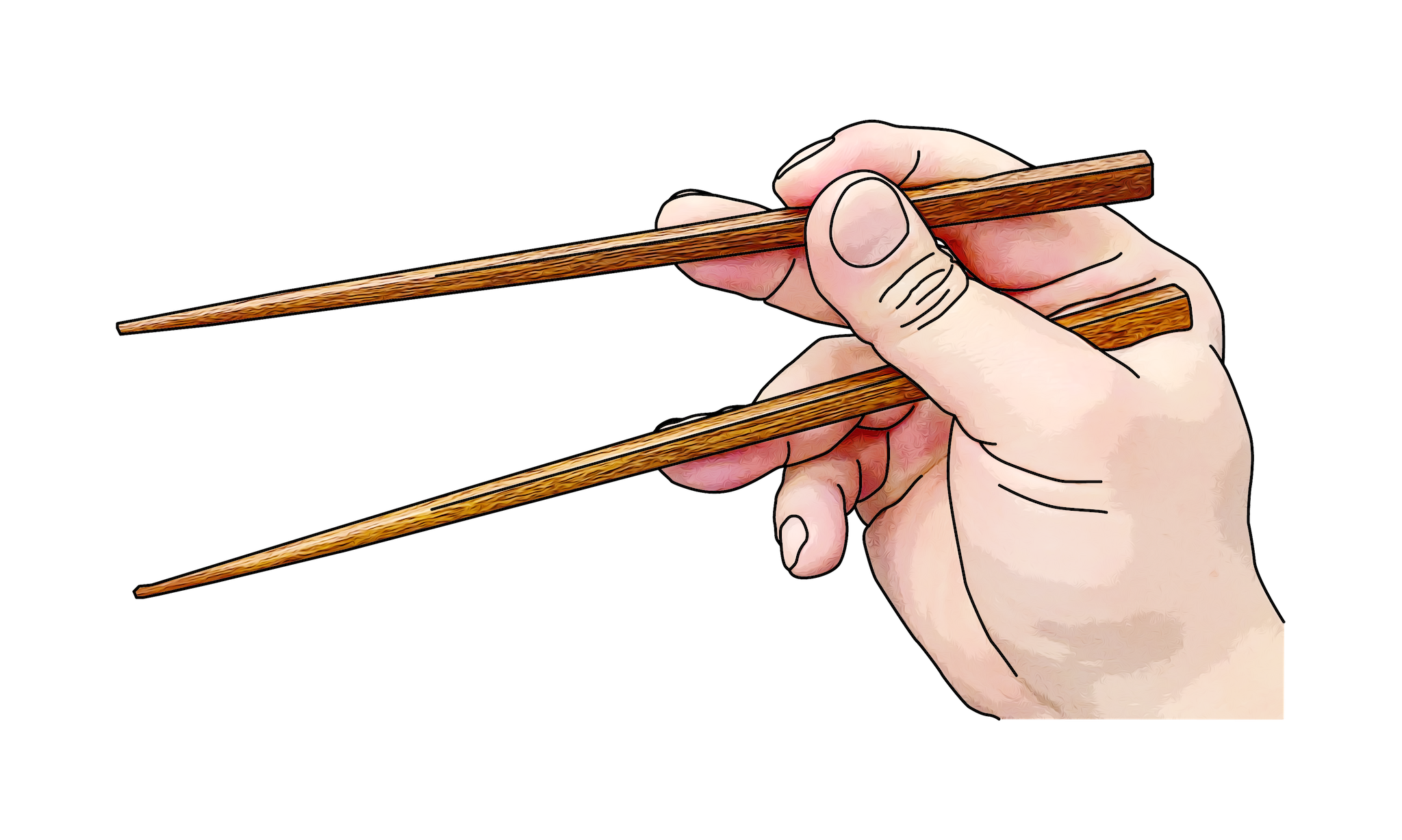
Vulcan

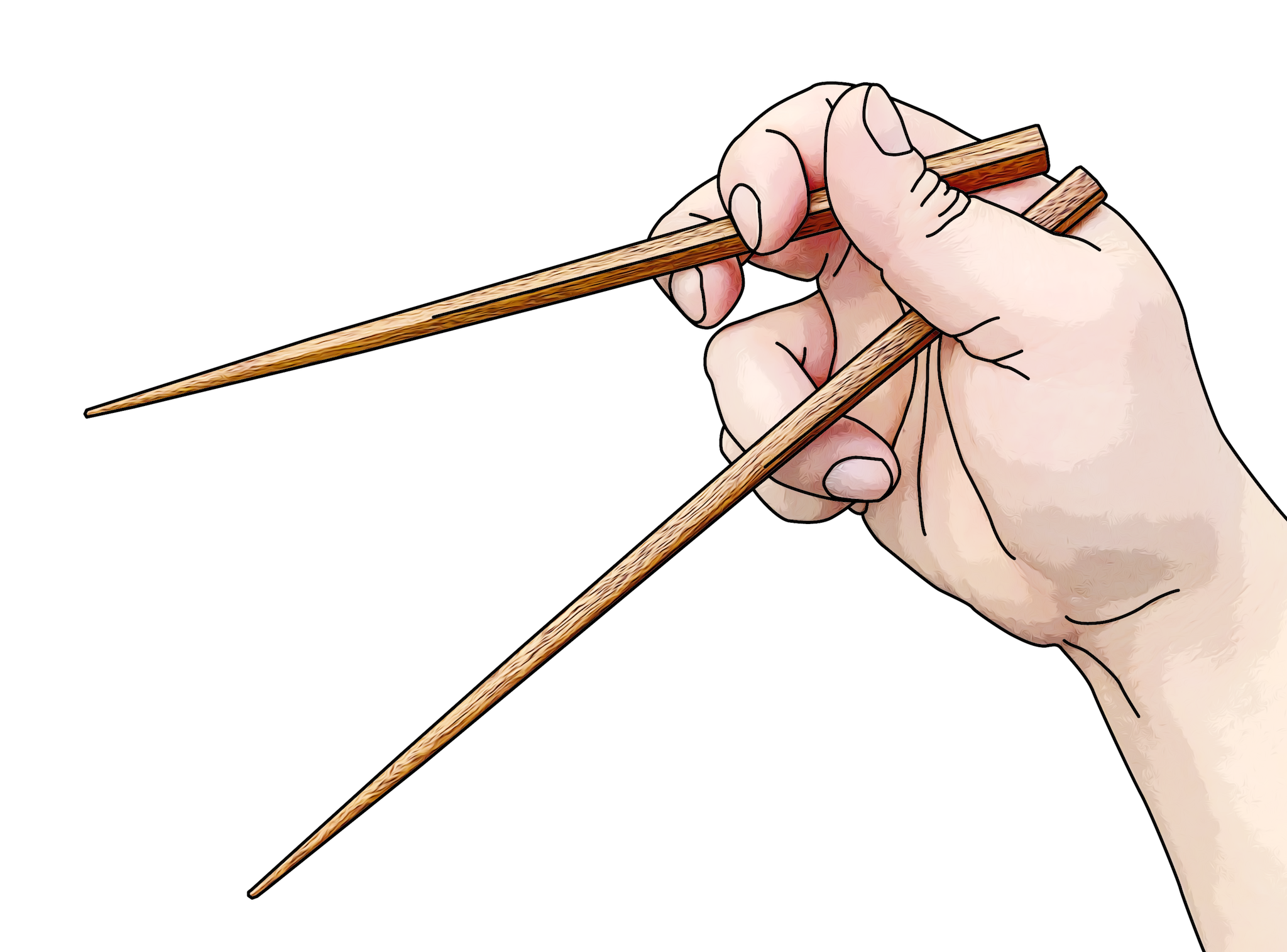
Chicken claws

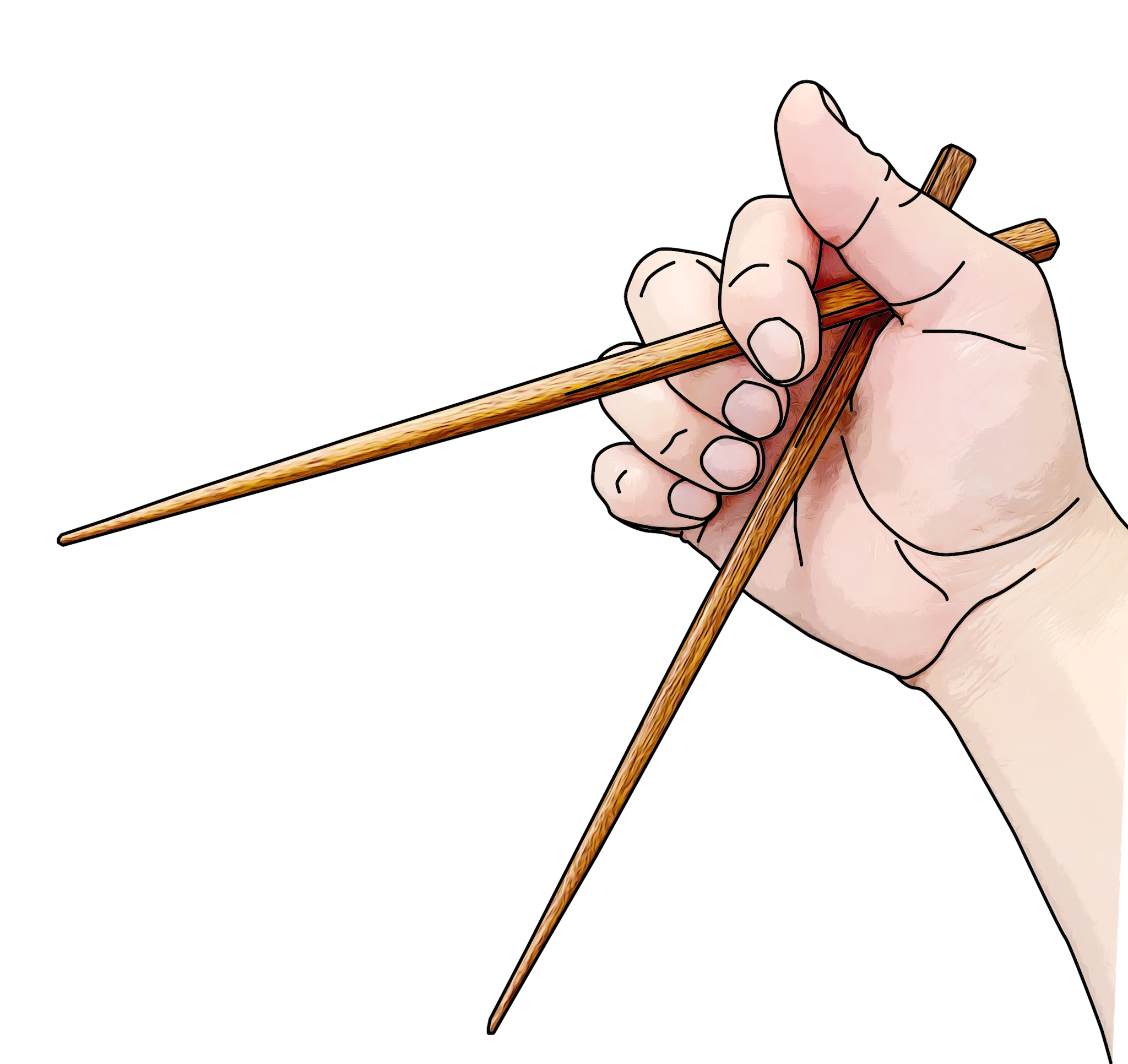
Dangling stick

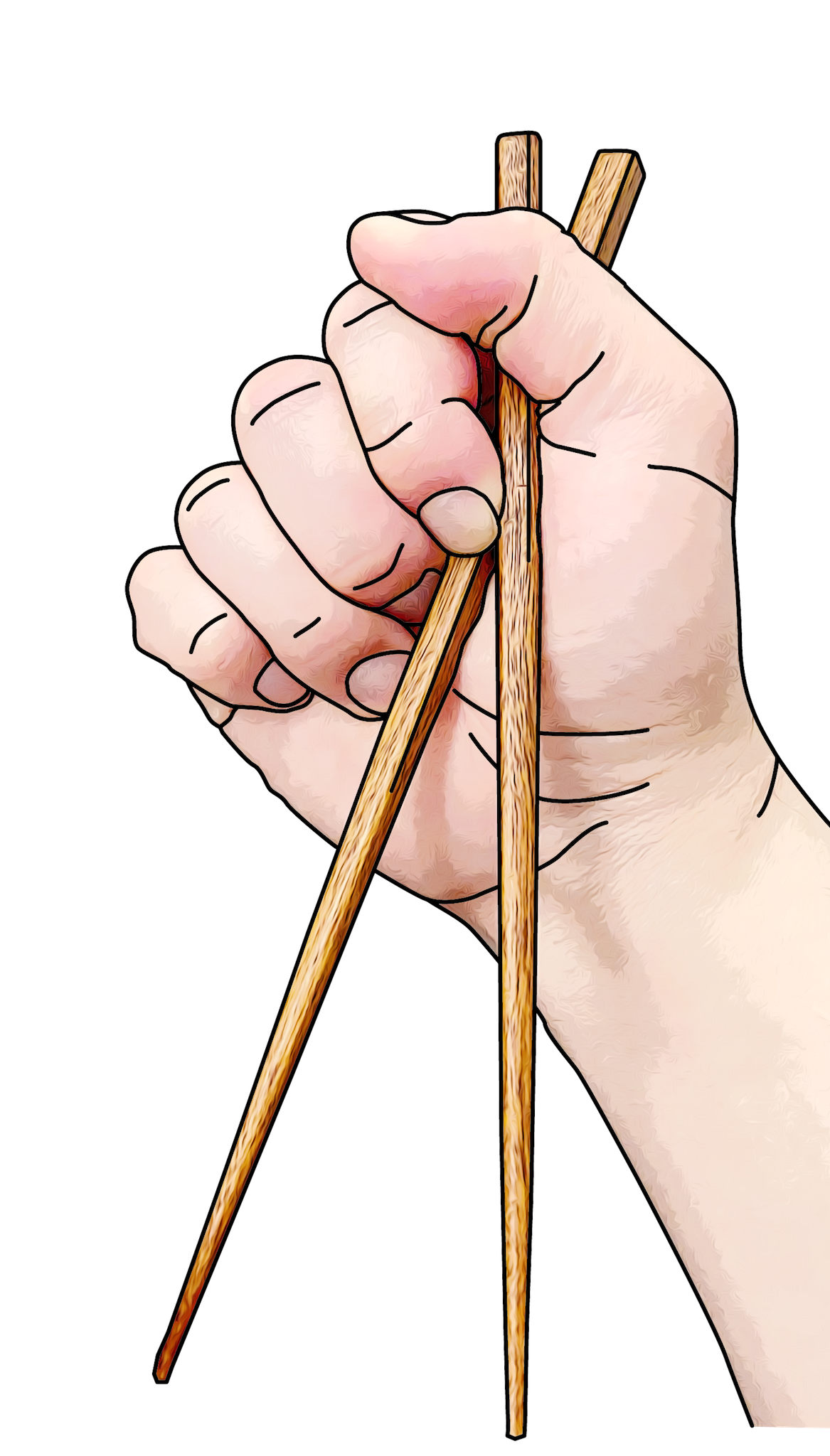
Scissorhand

=== Chopstick grips ===
Lifelong users and adult learners alike, around the world, hold chopsticks in more than one way. There is a general consensus on a standard grip being an efficient way to grip and wield chopsticks.

Regardless of whether users wield the standard grip, or one of many alternative grips, their goals are the same. They hold the two sticks in the dominant hand, secured by various fingers and parts of the hand, such that the sticks become an extension of the hand. Tsung-Dao Lee, a Nobel Prize laureate in physics, summarized it thus: "Although simple, the two sticks perfectly use the physics of leverage. Chopsticks are an extension of human fingers. Whatever fingers can do, chopsticks can do, too."

Alternative grips differ in their effectiveness in picking up food. They differ in the amount of pinching (compression) power they can generate. Some grips can generate substantial, outward extension force, while others are unable to do so.

=== Standard grip ===
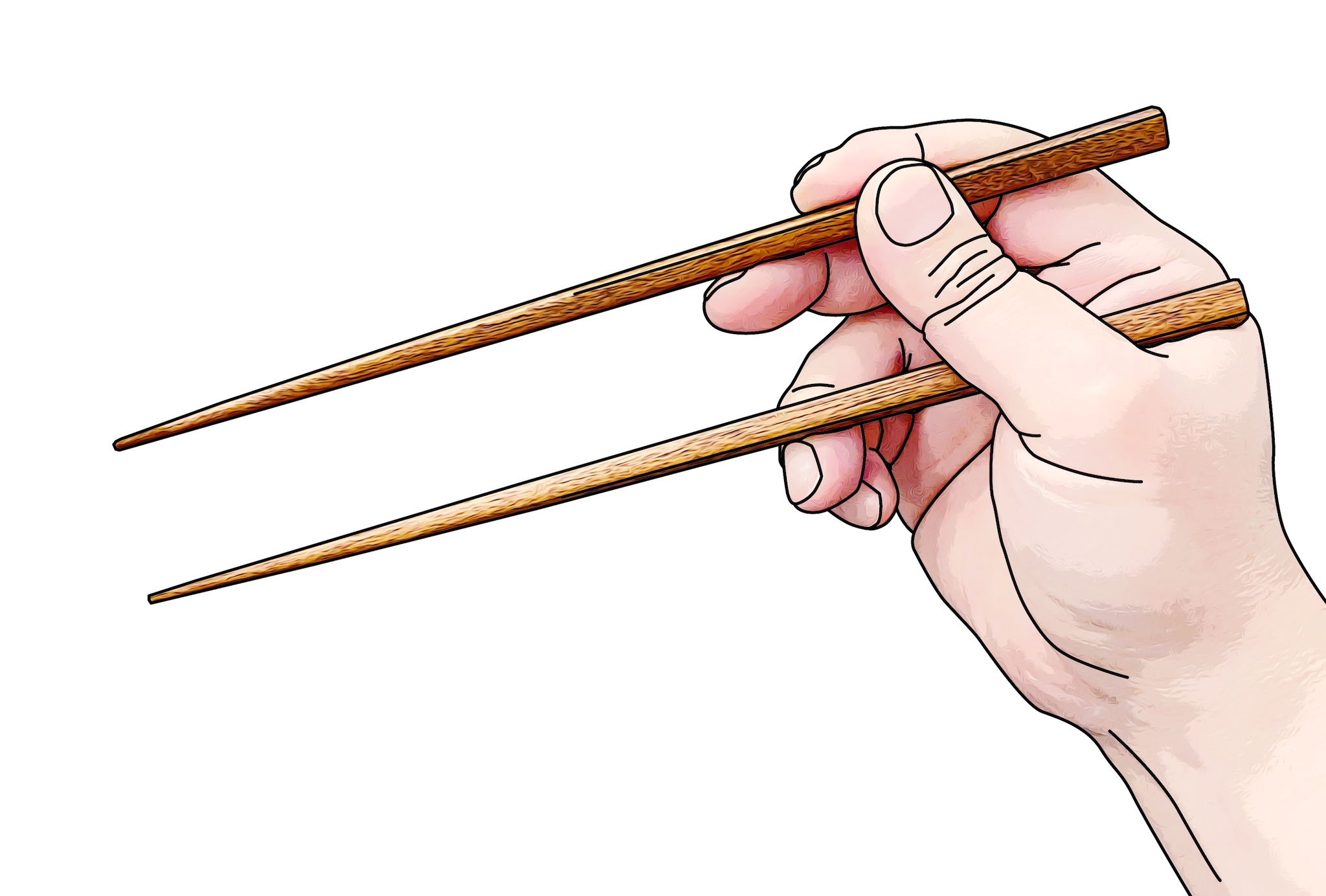
Standard grip

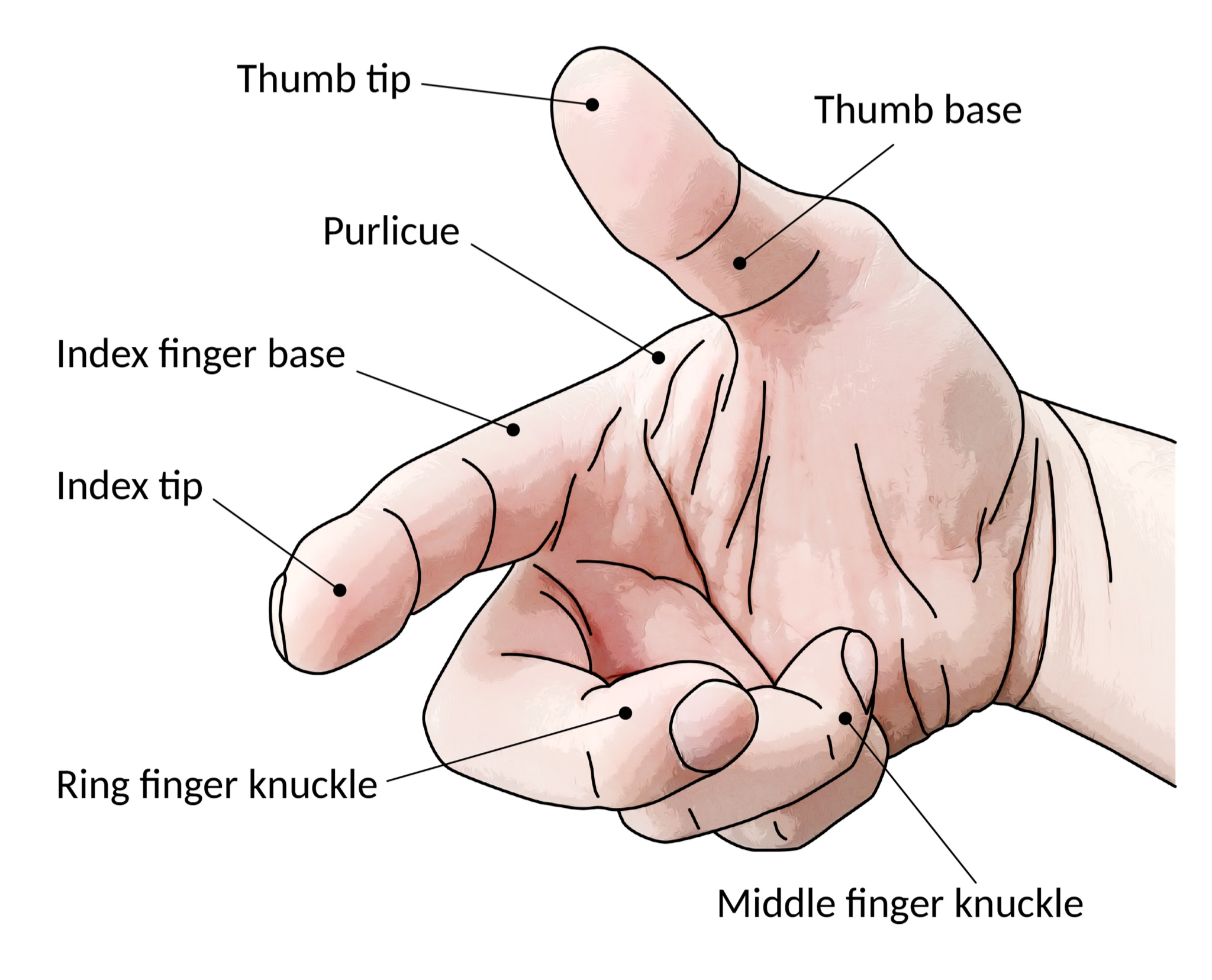
Parts of fingers and hand

The standard grip calls for the top chopstick to be held by the tip of the thumb, the tip of the index finger, and the middle finger knuckle. These three fingers surround the top stick from three sides, and firmly secure the stick as if they were holding a pen. The three fingers, using this tripod-like hold, can wiggle and twirl the top stick, as if it were an extension of them. The rear end of the top stick rests on the base of the index finger.

The bottom chopstick, however, generally remains immobile. It is secured by the base of the thumb, which presses the stick against the knuckle of the ring finger, and against the purlicue. The thumb therefore does double duty. It holds the bottom stick immobile, and at the same time, it also moves the top stick. The thumb must be flattened, in order to perform this double duty.

== Learning to use chopsticks ==
In chopstick-using cultures, learning to use chopsticks is part of a child's development process. The right way to use chopsticks is usually taught within the family. (Note: There is a lack of written literature on the variety of chopstick grips, naming of these, classifications of these, factors used to determine grip differences, etc. There is also a lack of literature on the presumed standard grip, its physics, and its mechanical leverage. Detailed written literature on how to learn the standard grip has yet to be discovered. For the time being, summaries written in this article on the use of chopsticks can be substantiated by direct observations of a person using chopsticks, and by watching online videos.) But many young children find their own ways of wielding chopsticks in the process. There exists a variety of learning aids that parents purchase to help their children learn to use chopsticks properly.

Adult learners, on the other hand, may acquire the skill through personal help from friends, or from instructions printed on wrapper sleeves of some disposable chopsticks. Various video hosting platforms also provide a plethora of how-to videos on learning to use chopsticks. All the same, adult learners too, often find their own alternative grips to using chopsticks.

In general, learning aids attempt to steer learners towards the established standard grip. These aids attempt to illustrate or enforce the right standard grip mechanical leverage.

=== Full range of chopstick motion ===
Range of motion of the standard grip

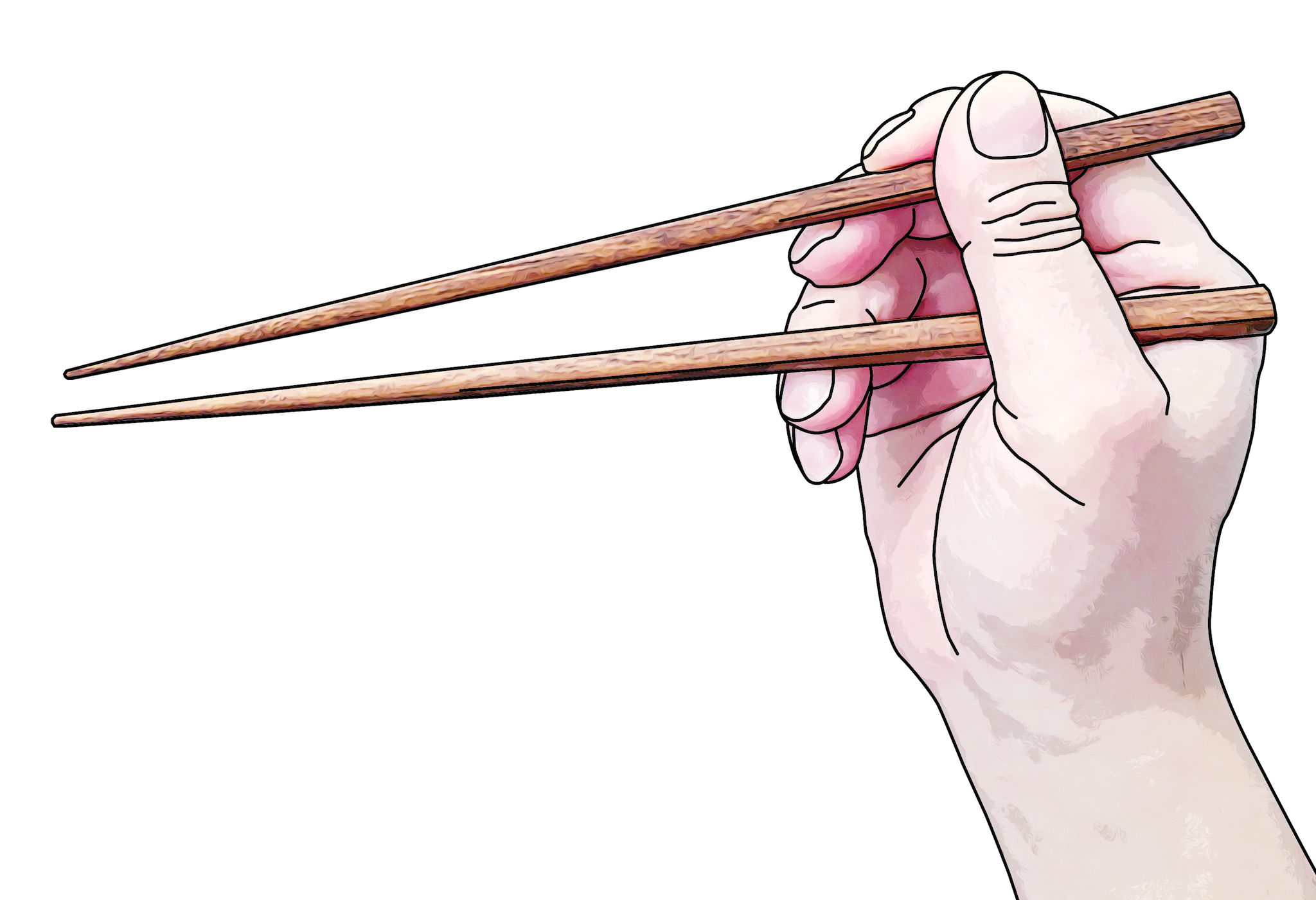
Closed posture

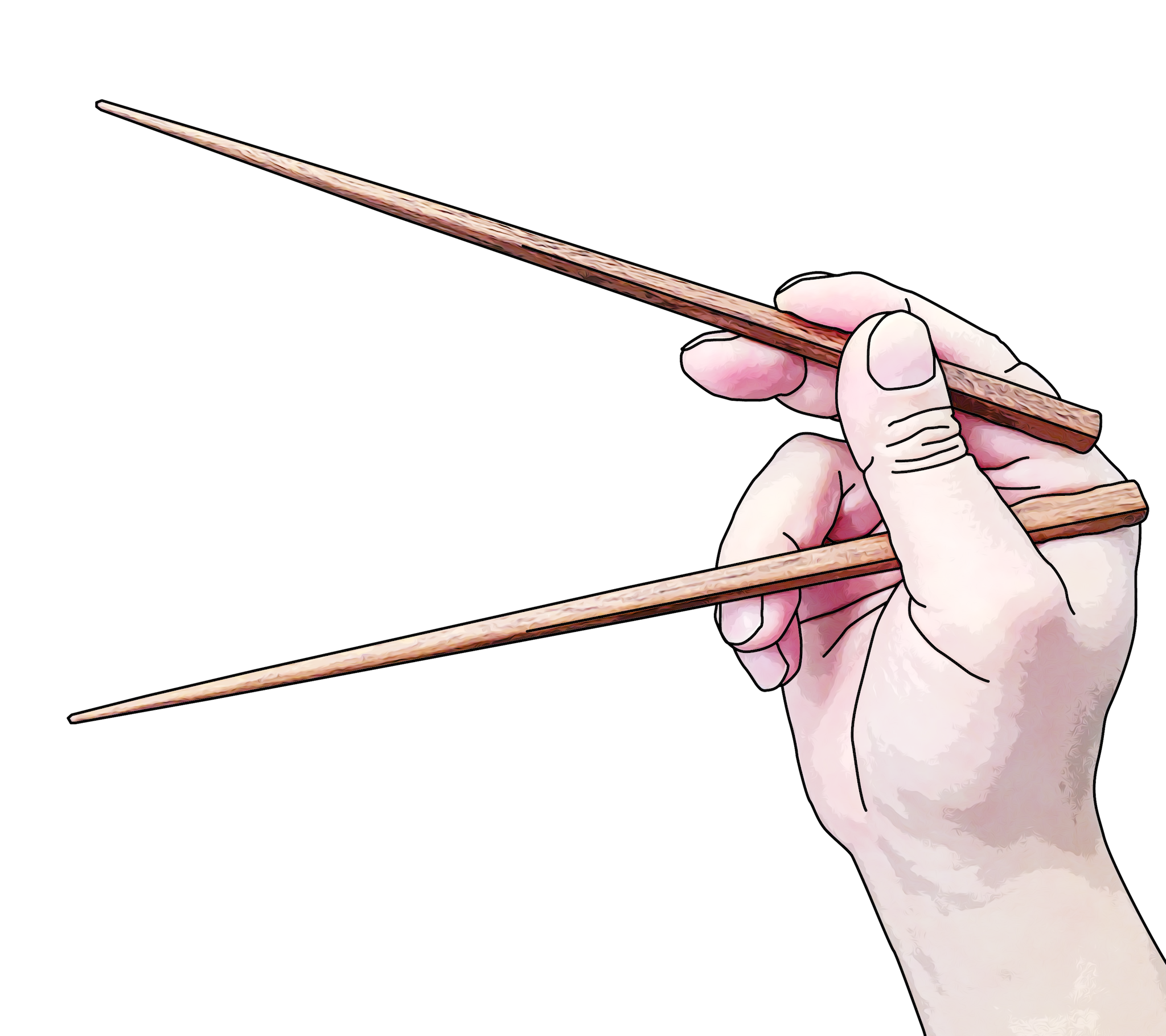
Open posture

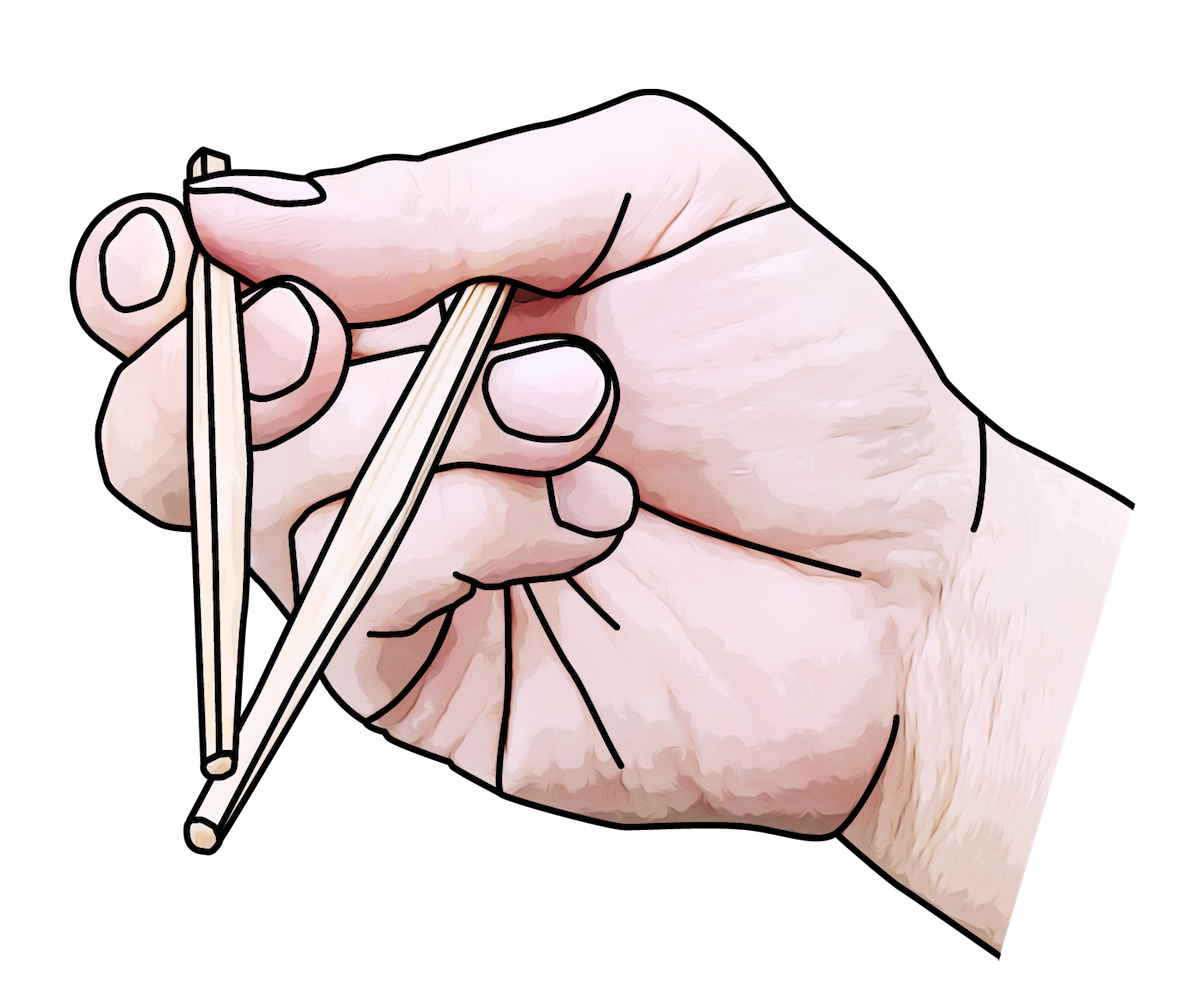
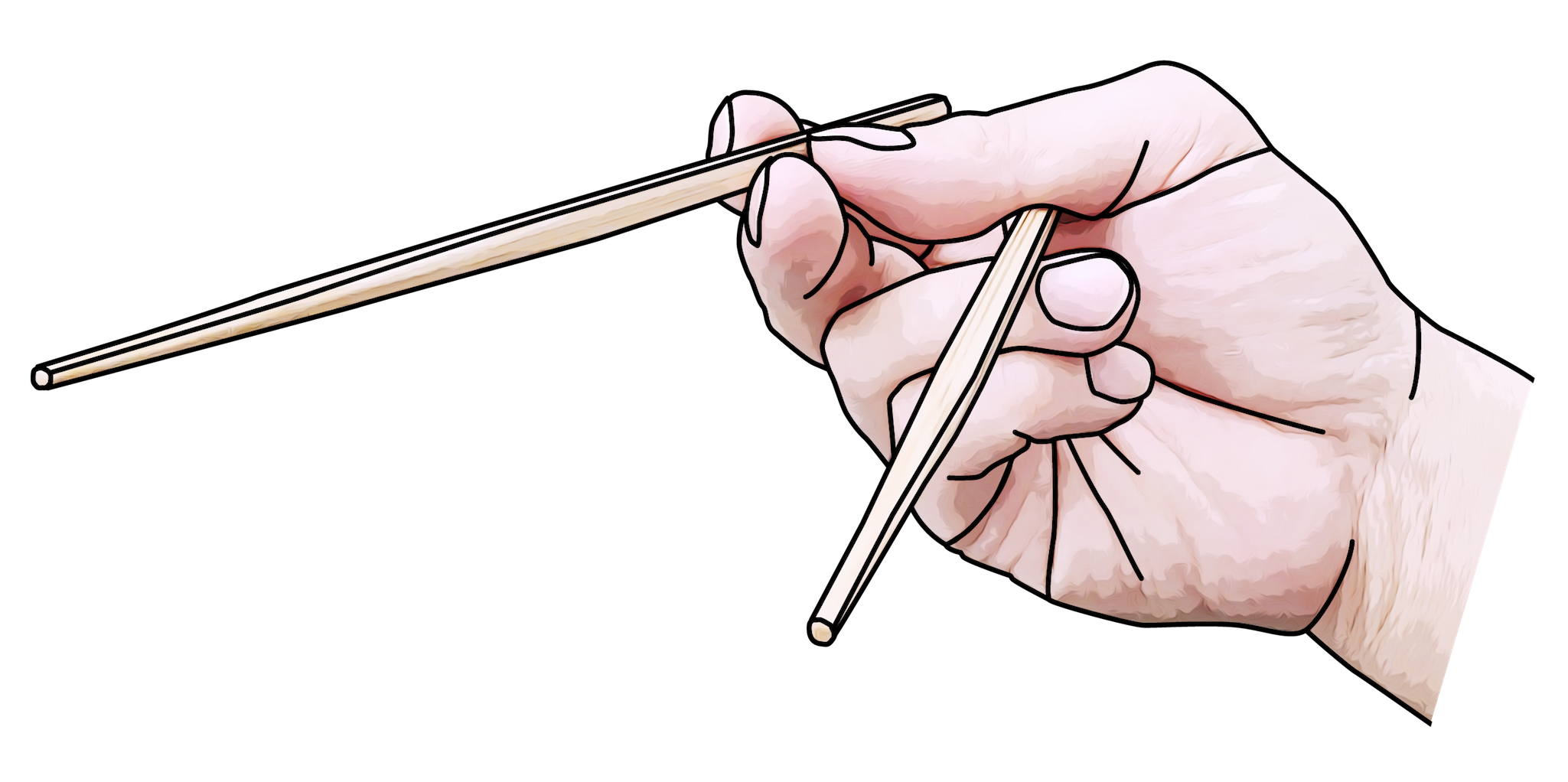
Side view showing flattened thumb

The learning process usually starts with a proper initial placement of fingers, per standard grip. It is crucial for learners to understand how to hold both sticks firmly in the hand, as extensions of fingers.

The next step involves learning the right motion of fingers, in order to move the top stick from the closed posture where tips of chopsticks touch, to the open posture where tips are extended wide apart for embracing food items. The open posture and the closed posture define the two ends of maximum standard grip motion. In most eating situations, tips of chopsticks need not be extended this wide apart.

Both finger placement and standard grip motion rely on the thumb being flattened. With this flat thumb pose, the base of the thumb can exert enough force to pin the bottom stick against the knuckle of the ring finger, and against the purlicue. At the same time, the tip of the thumb pushes back against the index finger and the knuckle of the middle finger, as all three wield the top stick in concert.

The shape of the flat thumb is such that the bottom stick is prevented from shaking loose, and from inching closer to the top stick, during repeated standard grip motion. Keeping the two chopsticks separated far enough, at the place they intersect with the thumb, is important for the standard grip. At the open posture, it allows tips to extend wide apart, without rear ends of chopsticks colliding. At the closed posture, it enables better control over tips of chopsticks.

=== Learning aids ===
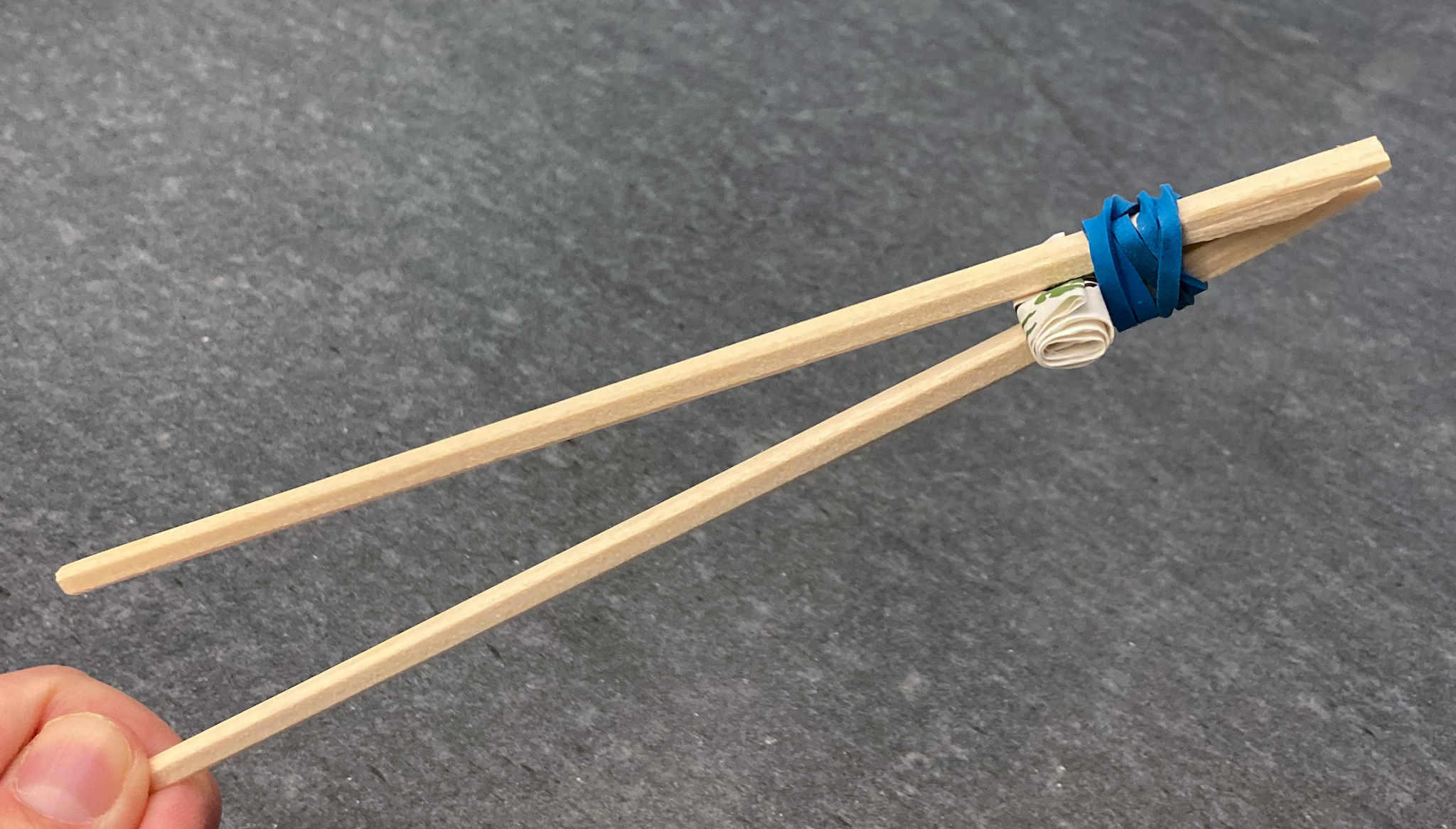
Wrapper and rubber band method

The most popular chopstick learning aid is arguably the wrapper-sleeve-and-rubber-band model, which is used in East Asian restaurants around the world. These are mostly operated like tweezers, or tongs. While they are useful for picking up food, they do not help learners acquire the standard grip. Many similar chopstick inventions can be found on the market, such as Kwik Stix. Some inventions combine other utensils with chopsticks. These include The Chork, the Fork and Knife Chopsticks, etc.

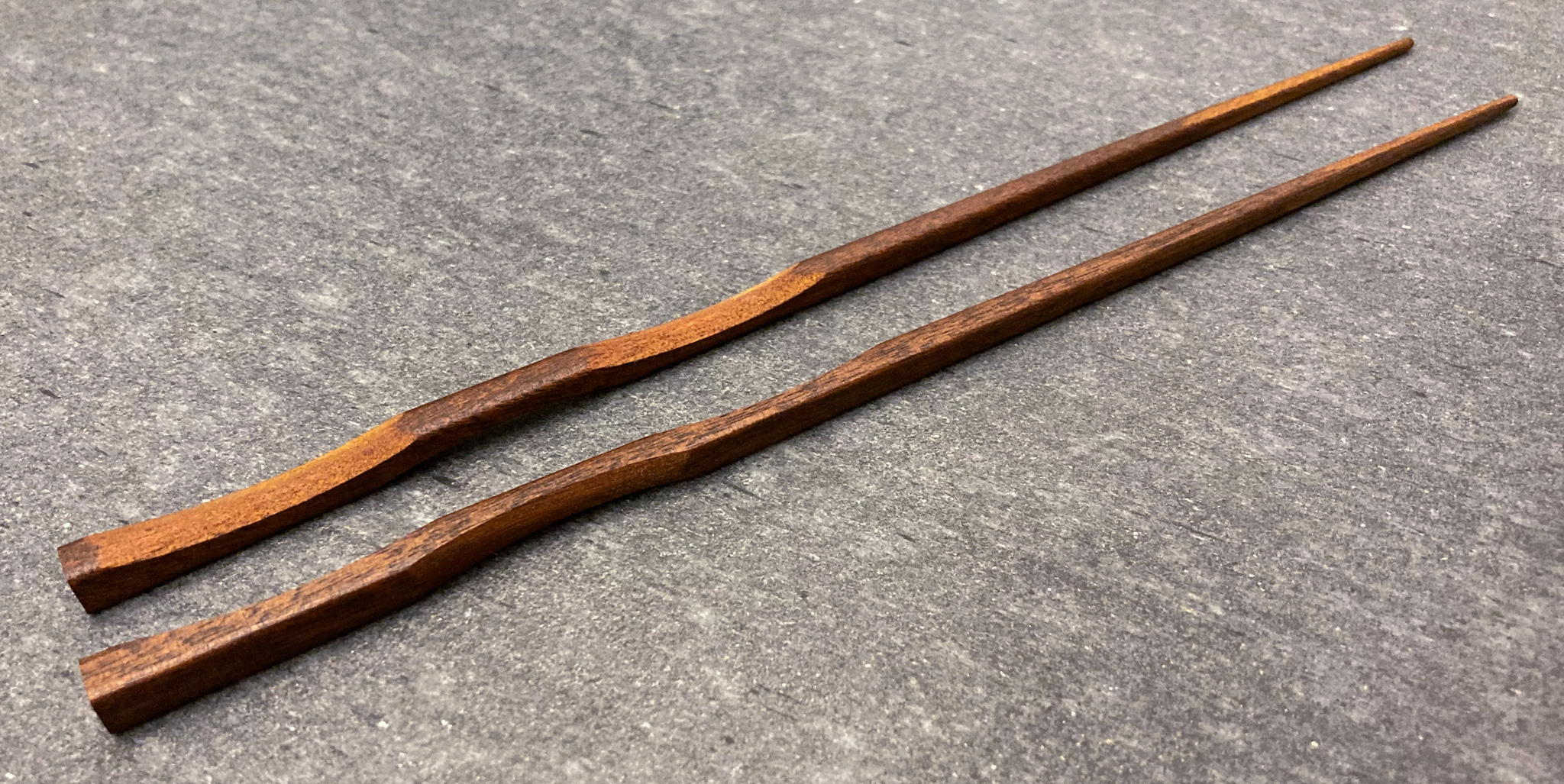
Finger placement learning aid

Some learning aids help learners with the initial placement of fingers, per standard grip. This can be done by making "index finger", "thumb tip", or equivalent labels at the right places on chopsticks. Often these chopsticks will have finger-shaped grooves carved out of sticks, to further help learners find the right placement. Other finger placement chopsticks instead carve circumferential grooves into sticks, in place of finger-shaped ones.

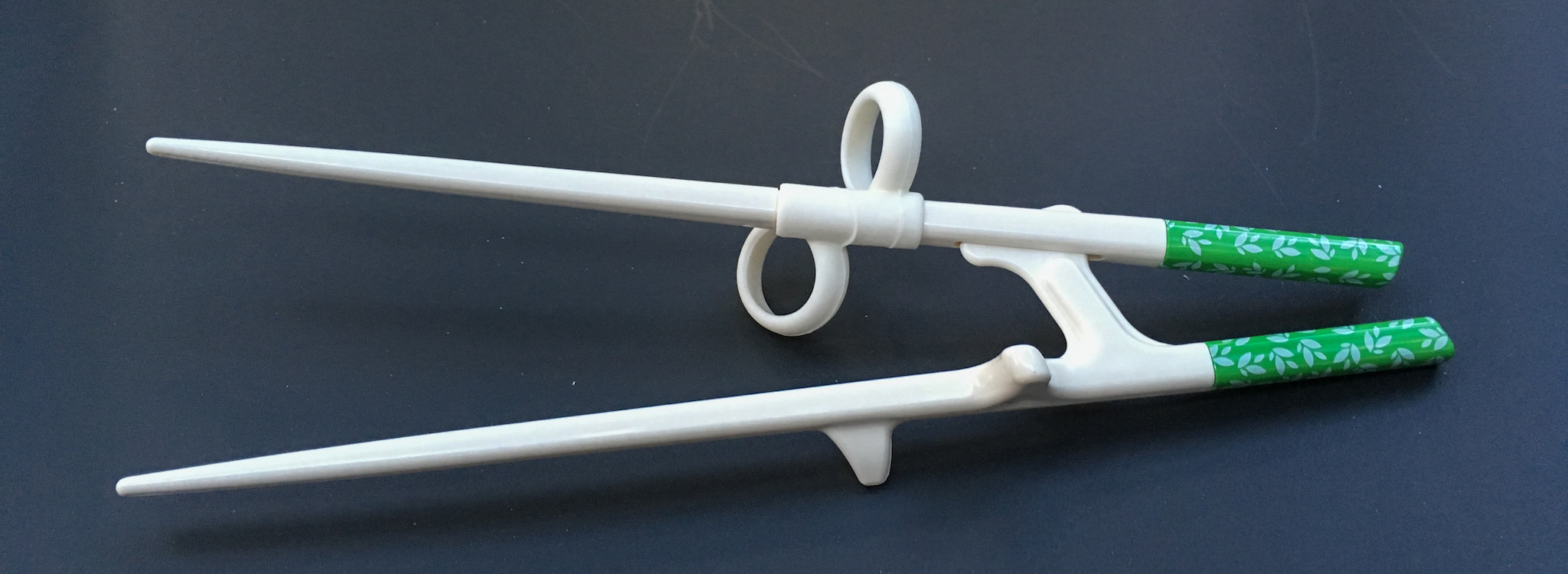
Exoskeleton learning aids

Some learning aids allow users to wield two sticks as extensions of their fingers, without the exact finger dynamics required by the standard grip. Some models provide hoops through which fingers can move the top chopstick as an exoskeleton of these fingers. Other models use finger-shaped tabs instead to achieve the same, for both top and bottom sticks. Yet other models combine finger placement features with the above. Usually these models connect the two chopsticks with a bridge and a hinge, holding the two sticks in the right configuration on behalf of users.

== Chopstick customs, manners and etiquette ==
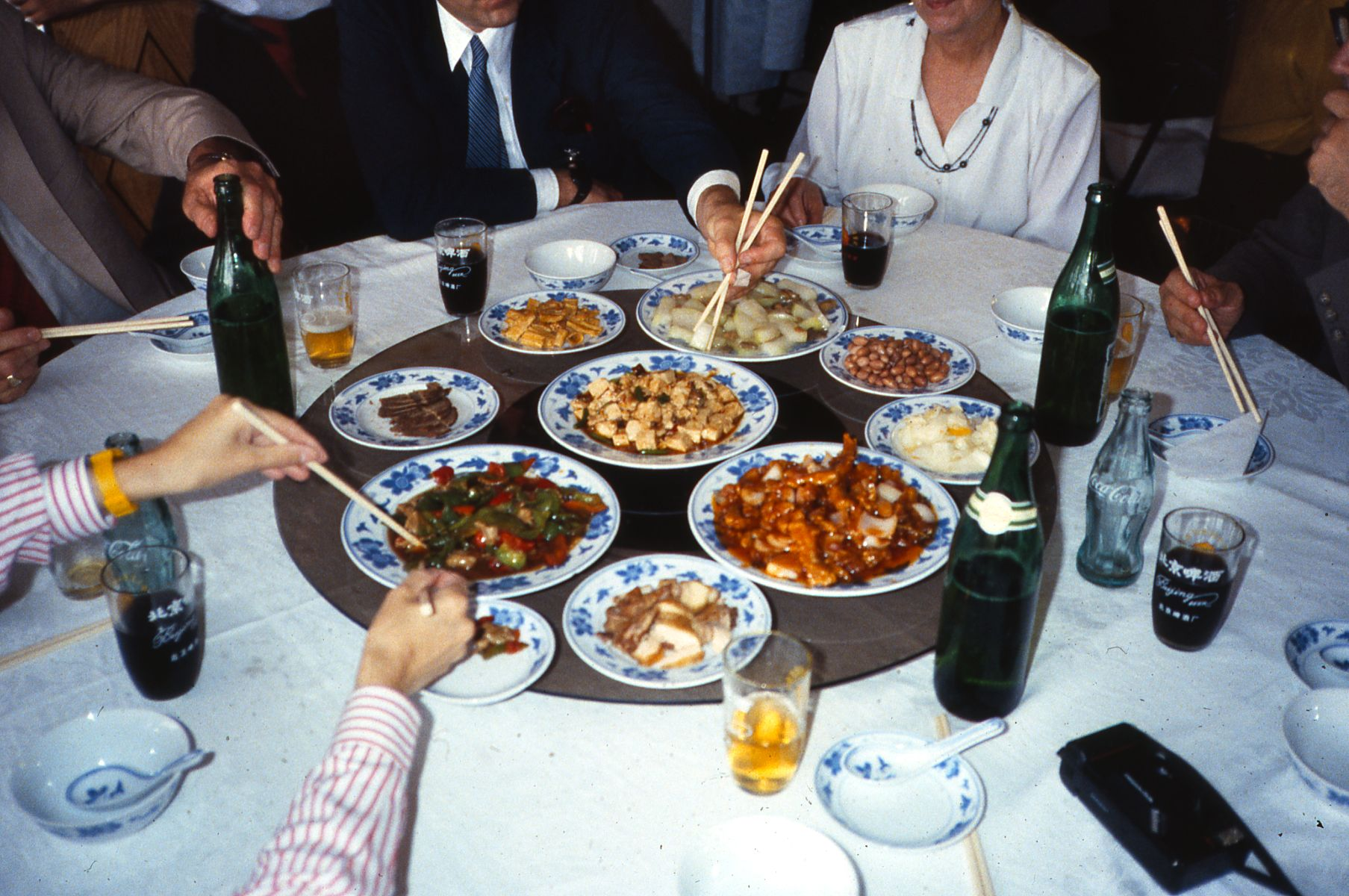
Westerners using chopsticks in a tourist restaurant in mainland China

Chopsticks are used in many parts of Asia and principles of etiquette are similar, but finer points can differ from region to region. Chopstick manners were gradually shaped to work with a culture's particular dietary varieties and habit. Etiquette developed for primarily individual servings eaten on the floor (or tatami in the case of Japan) could be different from communal meals eaten around a table while seated on chairs. The need for serving or communal chopsticks similarly differ. In some cultures it is customary to lift a bowl to the mouth, when the only eating utensil used is chopsticks. In other cultures, lifting a bowl closer to the mouth is frowned upon as equivalent to begging, as the local custom is to use chopsticks for chunky food, and a spoon for liquid food.

In chopstick-using countries, holding chopsticks incorrectly reflects negatively on a child's parents and home environment. There are frequent news articles on the alarming decline of children's abilities to use chopsticks correctly. Similarly, stabbing food due to one's inability to wield chopsticks with dexterity is also frowned upon.

In general, chopsticks should not be left vertically stuck into a bowl of rice because it resembles the ritual of incense-burning that symbolizes "feeding" the dead.

=== Sinosphere ===
==== China ====
- When eating rice from a bowl, it is normal to hold the rice bowl up to one's mouth and use chopsticks to push or shovel the rice directly into the mouth.
- It is traditionally acceptable to transfer food using one's own chopsticks to closely related people. Family members transfer a choice piece of food from a dish to that of an elder person before dinner starts, as a sign of respect. In modern times, the use of serving or communal chopsticks for this transfer has gained momentum, for better sanitary practices.
- Chopsticks, when not in use, are placed either to the right or below one's plate in a Chinese table setting.
- It is poor etiquette to tap chopsticks on the edge of one's bowl; beggars make this sort of noise to attract attention.
- One should not "dig" or "search" through food for something in particular. This is sometimes known as "digging one's grave" or "grave-digging" and is extremely poor form.

==== Japan ====
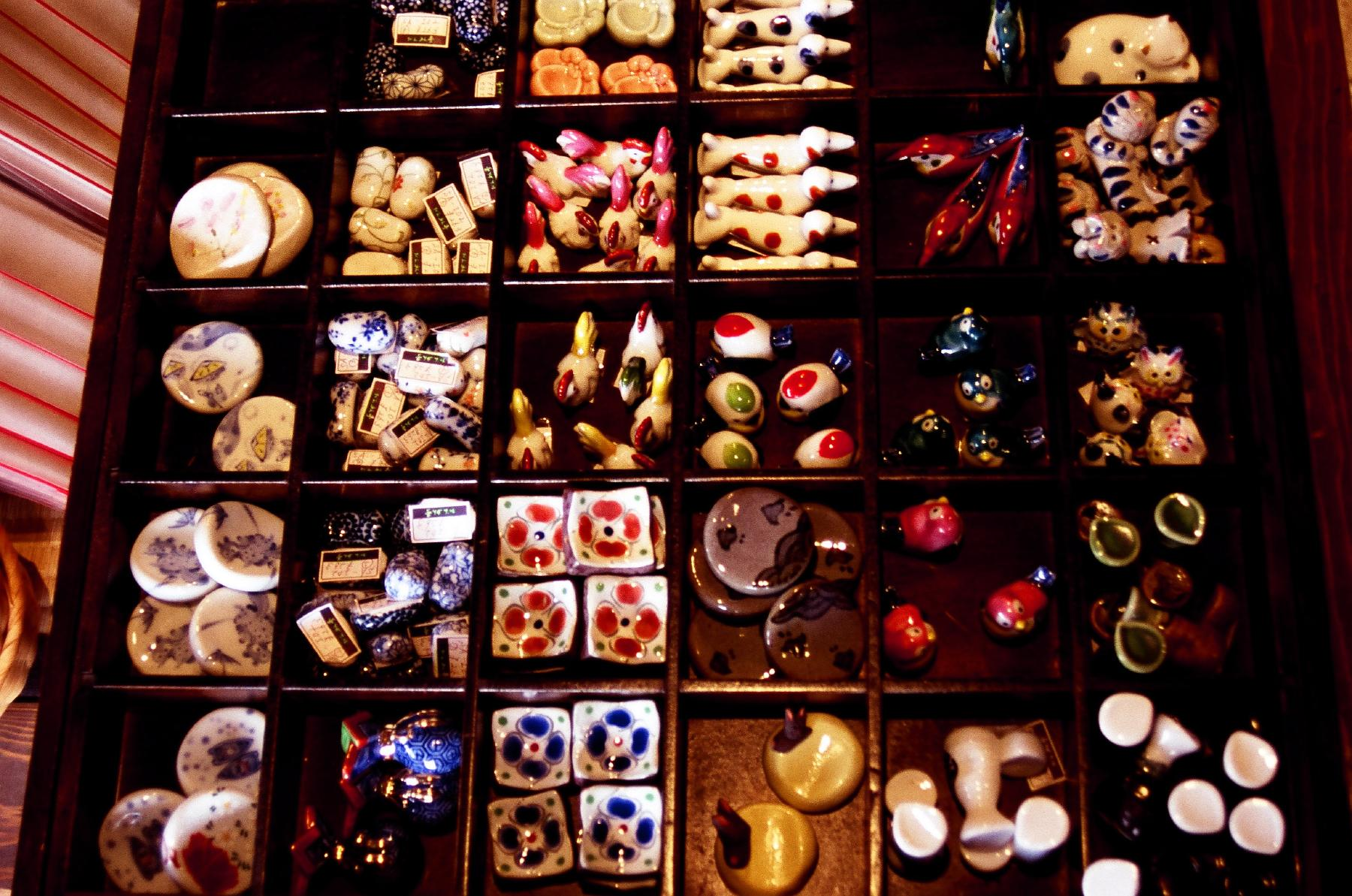
Various chopstick rests

- The pointed ends of the chopsticks should be placed on a chopstick rest when the chopsticks are not being used. However, when a chopstick rest is not available as is often the case in restaurants using waribashi (disposable chopsticks), chopstick wrappers may be folded into a rest.
- Reversing chopsticks to use the opposite clean end can be used to move food from a communal plate, and is acceptable if there are no communal chopsticks. In general, reversing chopsticks (逆さ箸, sakasabashi) is frowned upon, however, because of the association to the celebratory chopsticks (祝い箸, iwai-bashi), where both ends of chopsticks are tapered, but only one end is for humankind to use, while the other is for use by kami.
- Chopsticks should not be crossed on a table, as this symbolizes death.
- Chopsticks should be placed in the horizontal direction, with the tips to the left.
- In formal use, waribashi should be replaced into the wrapper at the end of a meal.
- It is rude to stand chopsticks vertically in rice, or pass food from one pair of chopsticks to another, as these are reminiscent of parts of Japanese funeral traditions.

==== Korea ====
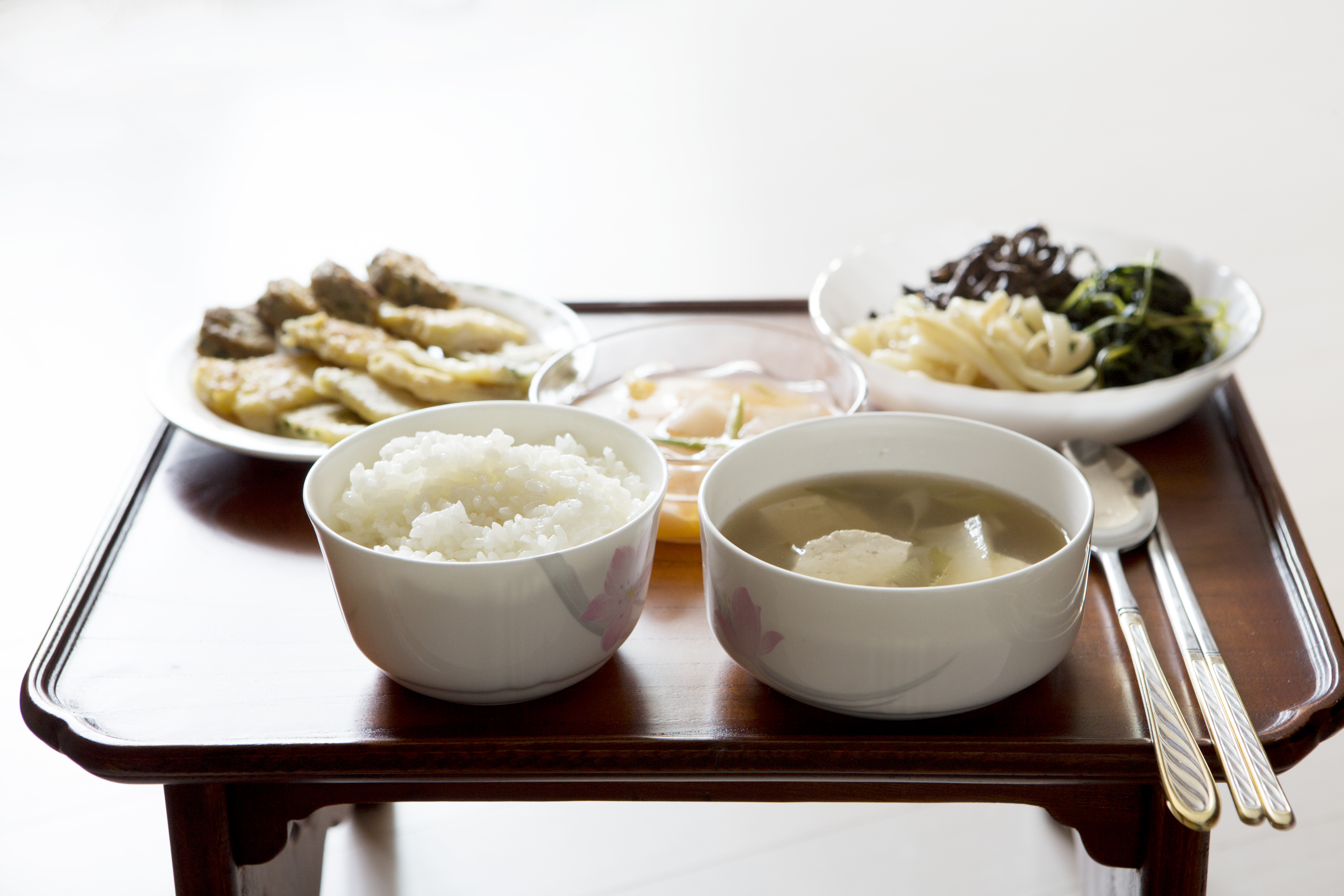
Simple Korean table (chopsticks and a spoon placed palewise, on the right side of rice and soup)

- In Korea, chopsticks are paired with a spoon, forming a sujeo set. Sujeo are placed on the right side and parallel to bap (rice) and guk (soup). Chopsticks are laid on the right side of the paired spoon. One must never put the chopsticks to the left of the spoon. Chopsticks are only laid to the left during the food preparation for the funeral or the memorial service for the deceased family members, known as jesa.
- As in China and Japan, chopsticks are not stuck into food and left standing up, as this resembles food offerings at a grave for deceased ancestors.
- The spoon is used for bap (rice) and soupy dishes, while most other banchan (side dishes) are eaten with chopsticks.
- It is considered uncultured and rude to pick up a plate or a bowl to bring it closer to one's mouth, and eat its content with chopsticks. If the food lifted "drips", a spoon is used under the lifted food to catch the dripping juices. Otherwise however, holding both a spoon and chopsticks in one hand simultaneously or in both hands is usually frowned upon.

==== Vietnam ====
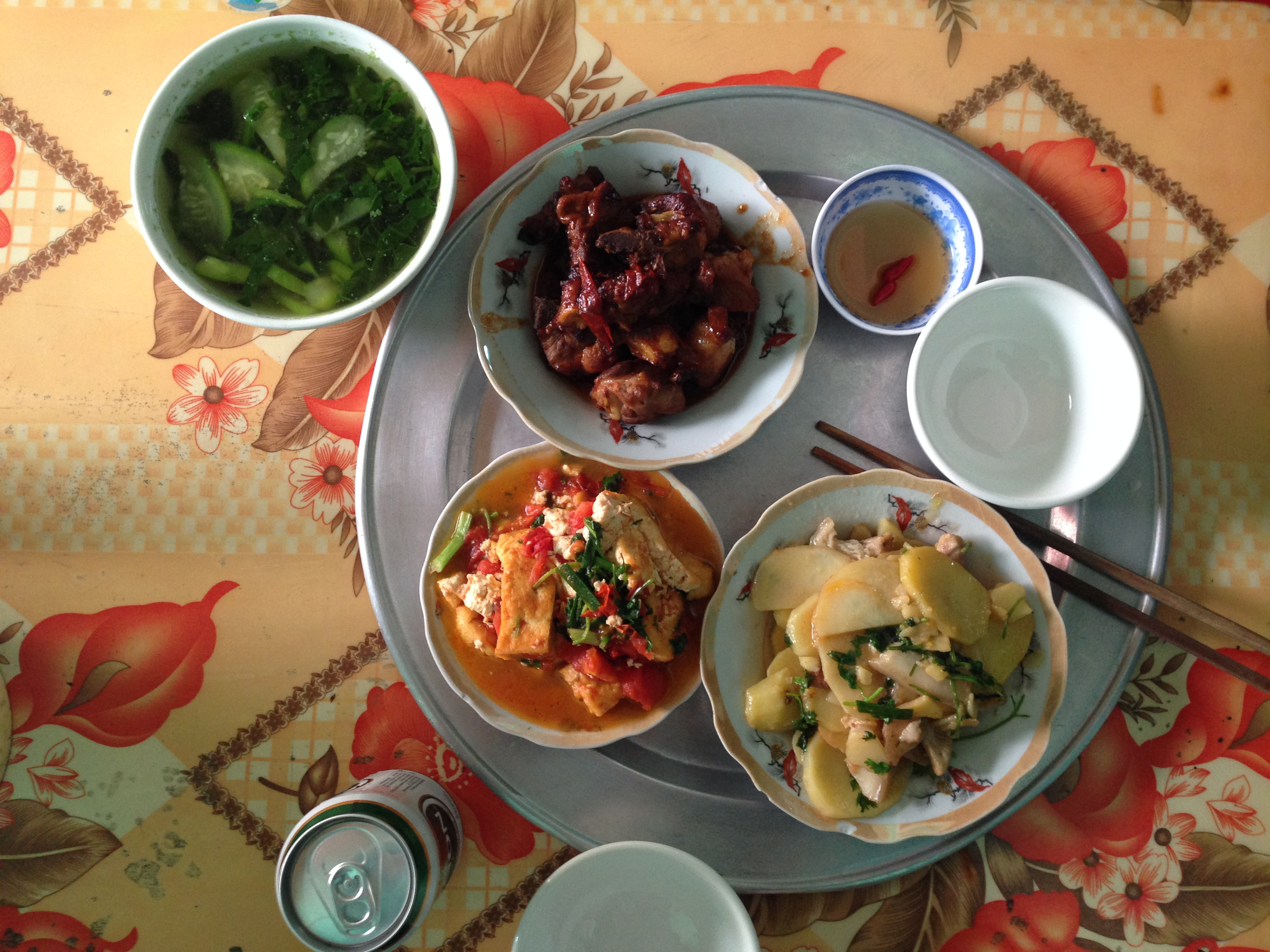
A household tray of rice in Vietnam

Most Vietnamese people also use chopsticks. Its customs are heavily influenced by its Chinese counterparts, including using chopsticks exclusively as eating utensils. Consequently, Vietnamese chopstick etiquette is very similar to the Chinese version. For instance, it is deemed proper to hold the bowl close to the mouth, just like is the case in China. Holding chopsticks vertically up like incense sticks is taboo. Tapping bowls with chopsticks is frowned upon.

Although there are some similarities with China, they still have some differences. Some other common Vietnamese taboos are:

- Placing chopsticks unevenly on the dining table: Before and during a meal, do not place long or short chopsticks on the table, because this is considered a bad omen. Influenced by the concept of China, the ancients also believed that this is similar to the coffin of the dead, made from 2 short wooden boards and 3 long wooden boards, representing bad luck. You should pay attention to equalize chopsticks when eating, not only to avoid possible bad luck but in fact it makes it easier to pick up food.
- Knocking chopsticks into the bowl: The act of tapping chopsticks on the side of a bowl is considered similar to a beggar. Because, in the past, only beggars used chopsticks to knock on pots to make the sound of begging for food. This is considered rude and unlucky and should absolutely be avoided, especially when dining with outsiders.
- Index finger pointing out when holding chopsticks: In this usage, the thumb, middle finger, ring finger, and little finger hold the chopsticks, while the index finger sticks out. It's like constantly pointing fingers at others, meaning to criticize and scold others. In addition, when talking during meals, pointing at others with chopsticks is also extremely disrespectful.
- Crossing chopsticks: This behavior usually goes unnoticed. When eating, many people arbitrarily put their chopsticks on the table. The ancients considered this behavior to be counterproductive, denying all people sitting at the same table.
- Using chopsticks to plug the rice bowl: This is taboo because it is similar to sticking incense in an incense bowl, implying an invitation to the deceased, bringing bad spirits to the meal.
- Using chopsticks to skewer food: If during a meal, chopsticks are inserted into the food, this is a kind of rude behavior, very impolite and taboo for the people sitting at the table.
- Sucking or biting chopsticks: When eating, holding chopsticks in your mouth, biting back and forth with your mouth, and sometimes making noises is considered an act of lack of upbringing, meanness and disrespect. In addition, this behavior and the sound it makes also make others feel uncomfortable and offensive. Therefore, this is not advisable behavior.
- Using a chopstick to stir the food: When eating rice but only using a chopstick to stir the plate of food, this must also be avoided, because it is considered to be insulting to those at the table.
- Connecting chopsticks together: When serving food for others, in addition to having to turn the chopsticks to keep the recipient's hygiene, you also have to pay attention to pick up the food and put it in their bowl and avoid "joining chopsticks", that is, passing food from chopsticks to chopsticks of others. this brings bad luck because in some places, when cremating the dead, the ashes will be passed with chopsticks. You should avoid bringing bad luck to you.
- Picking up and putting down without picking: In the past, well-educated girls were often taught to absolutely avoid using chopsticks to swing in the rice tray, choose food, and do not know where to lower the chopsticks to pick up the appropriate place. This type of behavior is a typical manifestation of lack of cultivation, moreover, not treating anyone well enough to make others feel offensive. In modern society, this behavior also does not make good sense.
- Searching through food: When eating rice but holding chopsticks in hand and constantly picking at food, in order to find a preferred food item, is likened to the act of "grave theft". This behavior also belongs to the behavior of lack of upbringing, causing offense.
- Picking up spilled food: Using chopsticks to pick up food that is not neat or pick up one dish and spill it on another or on the table is considered extremely rude.

=== Southeast Asia ===
==== Cambodia ====
In Cambodia, chopsticks, spoon and fork, and hands are the primary eating utensils. Although chopsticks are commonly used for noodle dishes, most Cambodians use chopsticks for any meal. Because Cambodia adopted the spoon and fork later than neighboring countries such as Thailand, it is common to see Cambodians use chopsticks for any meals. Forks are only used to help guide food onto the spoon. Forks are not used to shovel food into the mouth. For noodle dishes such as kuyteav and num banhchok, chopsticks are used. Cambodians do not use forks at all to put food in their mouth because they are seen as dangerous near the mouth area, and the soup spoon is used for the broth.

==== Indonesia and Malaysia ====
Chopsticks in Malay-speaking countries such as Brunei, Indonesia, and other parts of Southeast Asia are used for eating noodles almost exclusively, whilst spoon and/or fork are used for eating rice, and sometimes use of hands as well. Typically most commonly seen with dishes such as mie goreng (fried noodles, Indonesia) or mee goreng (also fried noodles, Malaysia, Brunei, Singapore).

==== Thailand ====
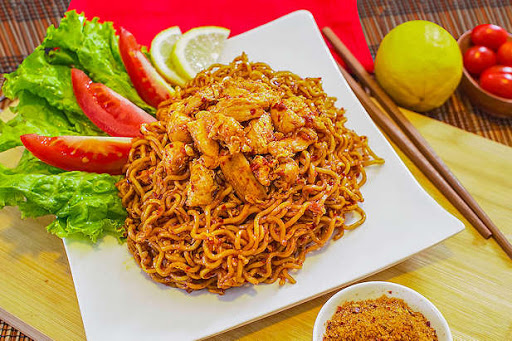
Mie Goreng (fried noodles) are often used with chopsticks and spoon.

Historically, Thai people used bare hands to eat and occasionally used a spoon and fork for curries or soup, the result of Western influence. But many Thai noodle dishes served in a bowl are eaten with chopsticks. Unlike in China and in Vietnam, chopsticks are not used with a bowl of rice. It is considered impolite to make a sound with chopsticks. It is poor etiquette to rest or hold chopsticks pointing towards others, as pointing is considered disrespectful.

== Global impacts ==
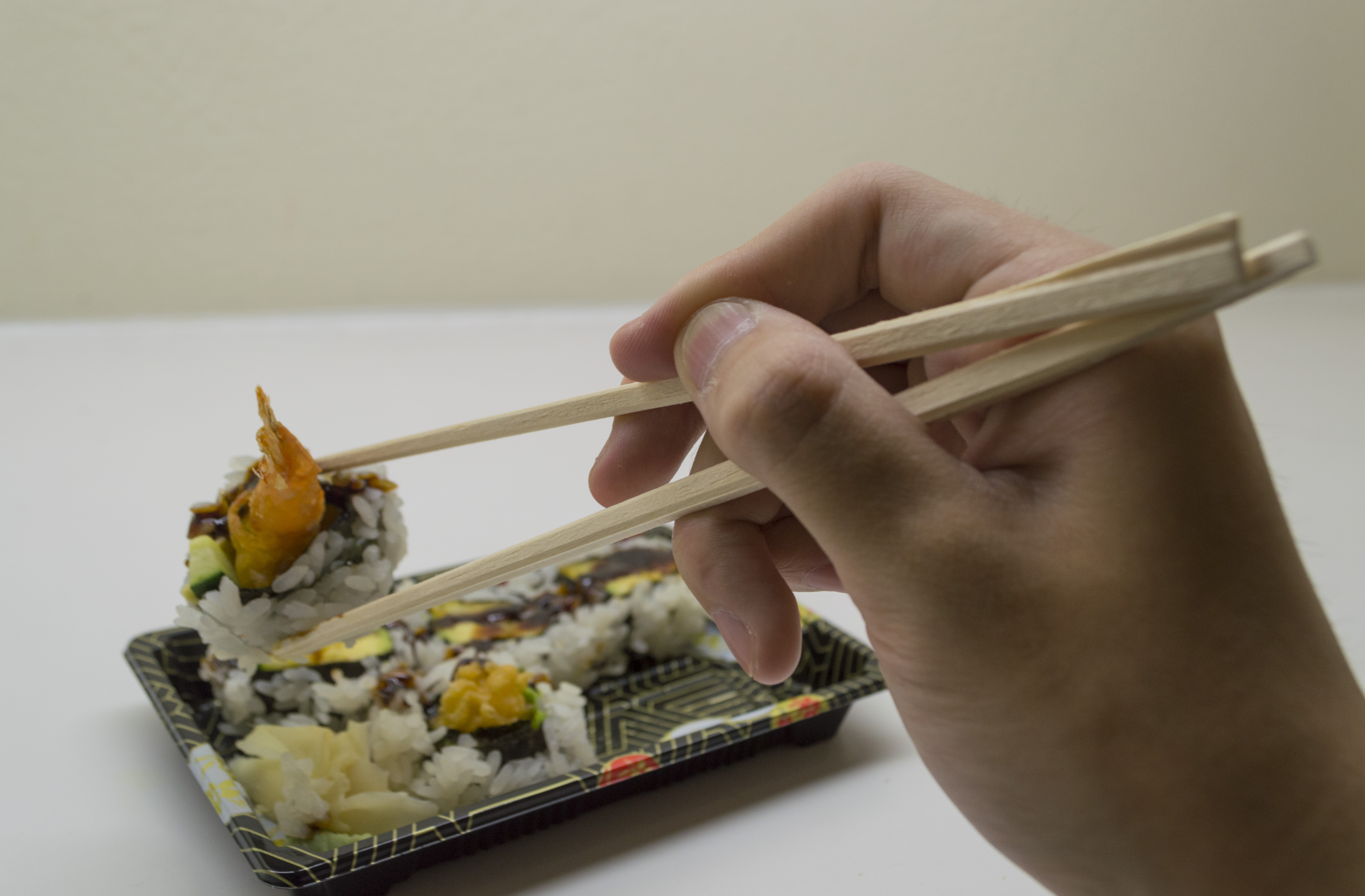
Disposable chopsticks

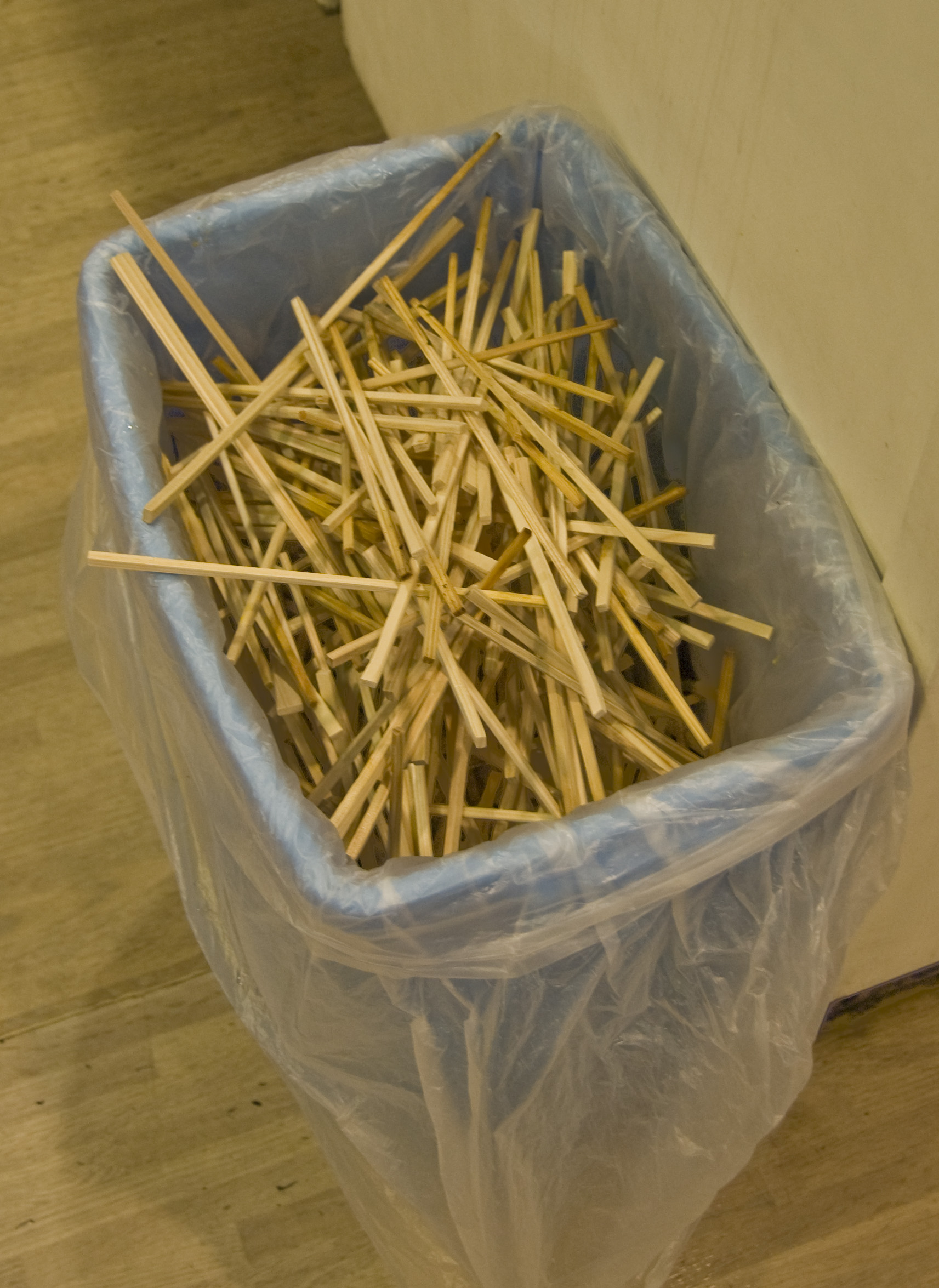
Disposable chopsticks in a recycle bin

=== Environmental impacts ===
The most widespread use of disposable chopsticks is in Japan, where around a total of 24 billion pairs are used each year, which is equivalent to almost 200 pairs per person yearly. In China, an estimated 45 billion pairs of disposable chopsticks are produced yearly. This adds up to 1.66 million cubic meters (59×10^{6} cu ft) of timber or 25 million fully grown trees every year.

In April 2006, China imposed a 5% tax on disposable chopsticks to reduce waste of natural resources by overconsumption. This measure had the most effect in Japan as many of its disposable chopsticks are imported from China, which account for over 90% of the Japanese market.

American manufacturers have begun exporting American-made chopsticks to China, using sweet gum and poplar wood as these materials do not need to be artificially lightened with chemicals or bleach, and have been seen as appealing to Chinese and other East Asian consumers.

The American-born Taiwanese singer Wang Leehom has publicly advocated the use of reusable chopsticks made from sustainable materials. In Japan, reusable chopsticks are known as maihashi or maibashi (マイ箸, meaning "my chopsticks").

=== Effects on health ===
A 2006 Hong Kong Department of Health survey found that, since 2003, the proportion of people using distinctly separate serving chopsticks, spoons, or other utensils for serving food from a common dish has increased from 46% to 65%.

When food is shared from communal dishes, using personal chopsticks to take food after they have touched the mouth can transfer microorganisms to the shared food. Separate serving chopsticks or spoons are meant to reduce this contamination by keeping the utensils used for serving different from those that are used to eat. Public health authorities in several Chinese cities promoted the use of separate serving utensils during the COVID-19 pandemic as a hygiene measure for shared meals.

== See also ==
- Chinese spoon
- Chinese cuisine
- List of eating utensils
