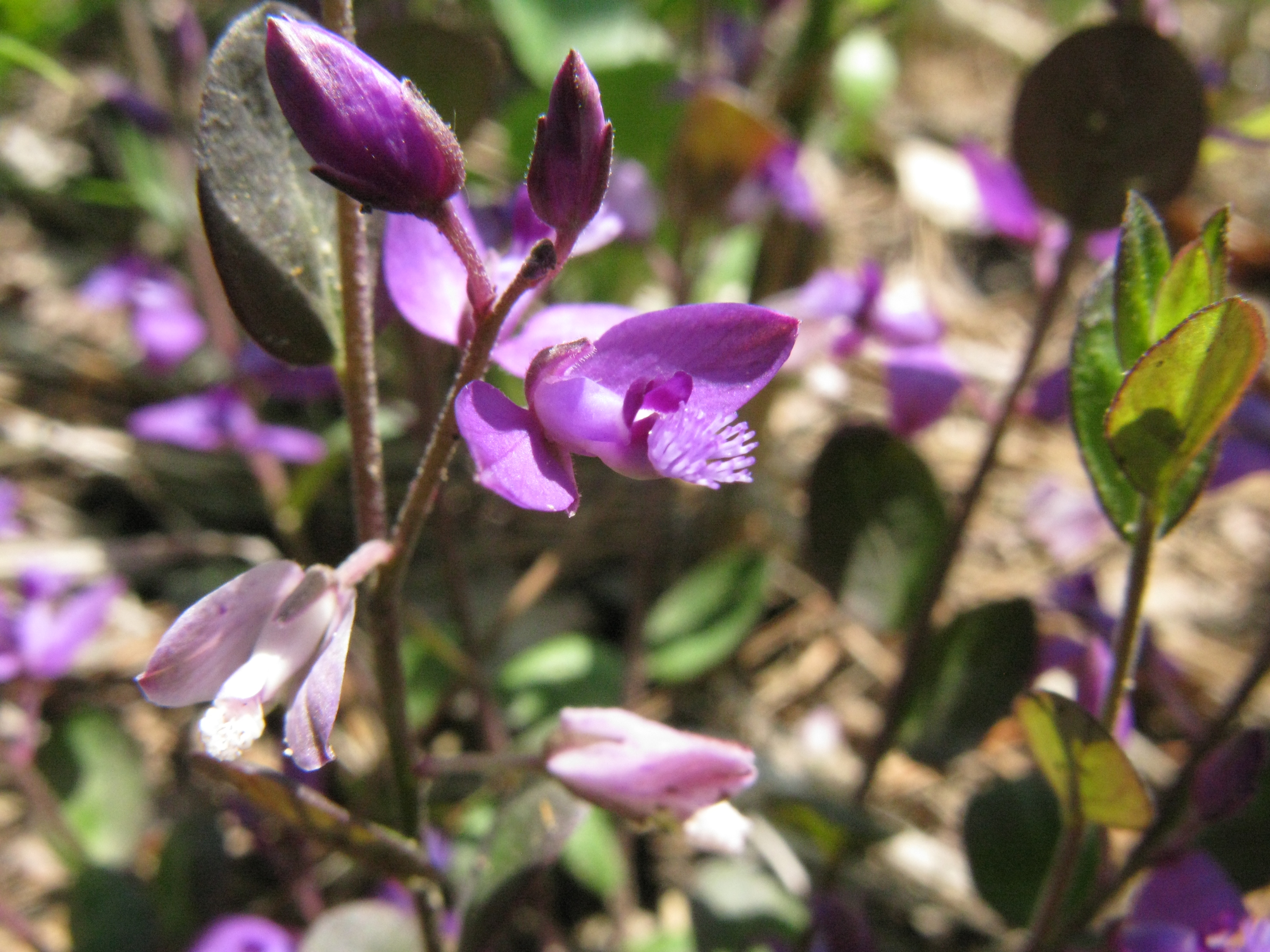

Scientific classification
- Kingdom: Plantae
- Clade: Tracheophytes
- Clade: Angiosperms
- Clade: Eudicots
- Clade: Rosids
- Order: Fabales
- Family: Polygalaceae
- Genus: Polygala
- Species: P. japonica

Binomial name
- Polygala japonica Houtt.

Synonyms
- Polygala coniicarpa Hance; Polygala hondoensis Nakai; Polygala loureroi Gardner & Champ.; Polygala luzoniensis Merr.; Polygala taquetii H.Lév.

= Polygala japonica =

Species of flowering plant

Polygala japonica is a species of flowering plant in the milkwort family (Polygalaceae). It is native to Northeast, East and Southeastern Asia, as well as eastern Australia. It is a wiry and decumbent dwarf shrub with a height between 10 and 25 centimetres (3.9 and 9.8 in). Its stems have tiny curled hairs. Its leaves are 5 to 20 millimetres (0.20 to 0.79 in) long and 3 to 10 millimetres (0.12 to 0.39 in) wide. Its flowers are purple to mauve and 5 to 6 millimetres (0.20 to 0.24 in) long. It flowers between October and December.
