= Butter knife =

Table knife used to spread butter

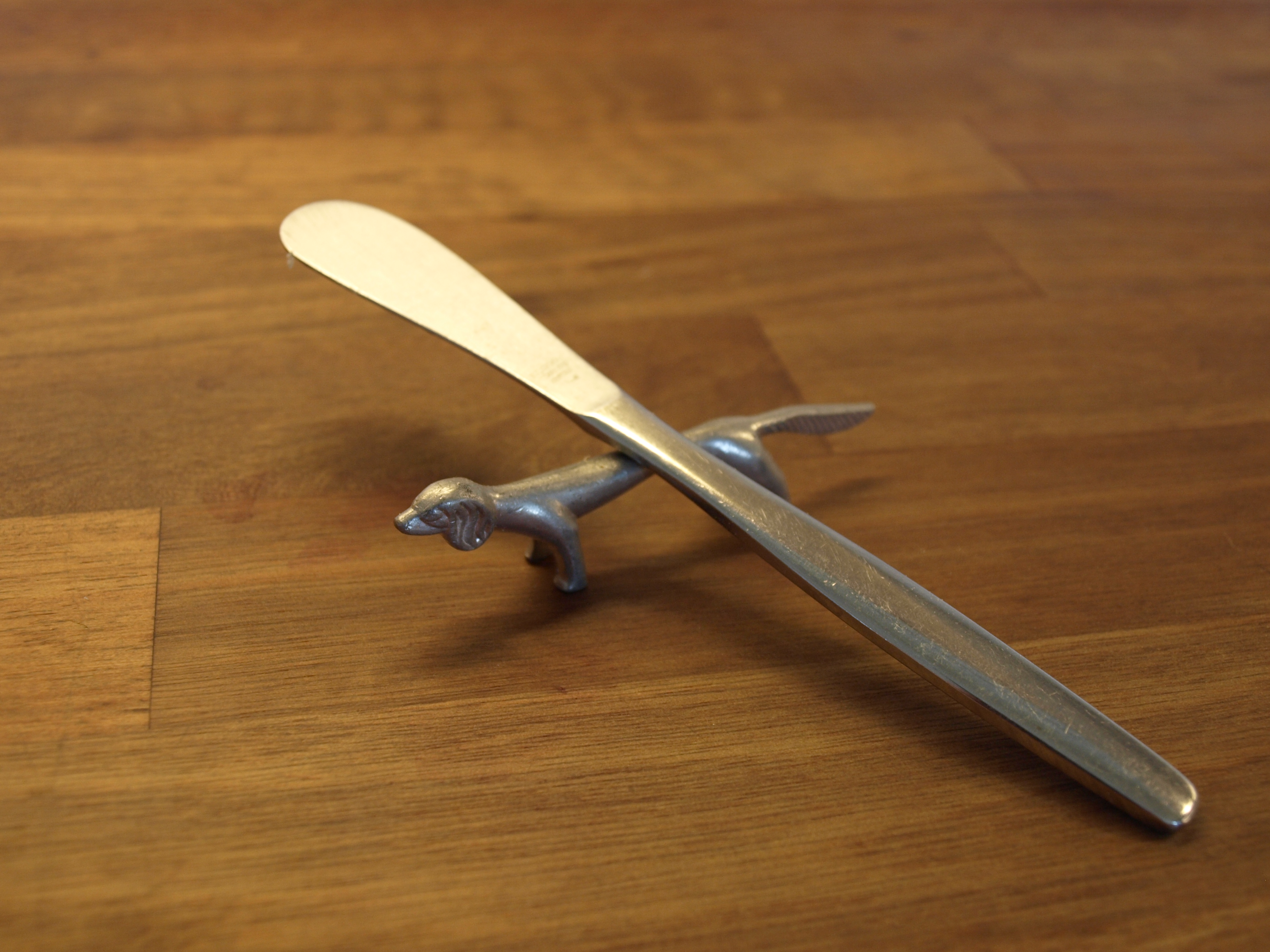
Modern butter spreader on a Swedish butterdog

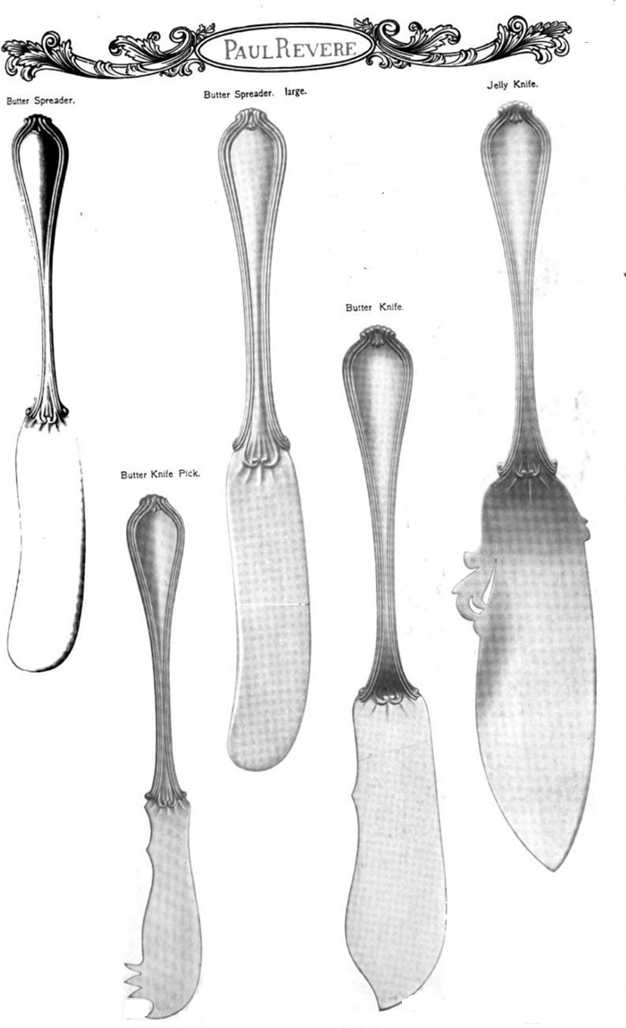
Butter knives (and a jelly knife) by Towle Silversmiths ("Colonial Paul Revere pattern, 1901). Left to right: small butter spreader, butter knife pick, large butter spreader, butter knife, jelly knife

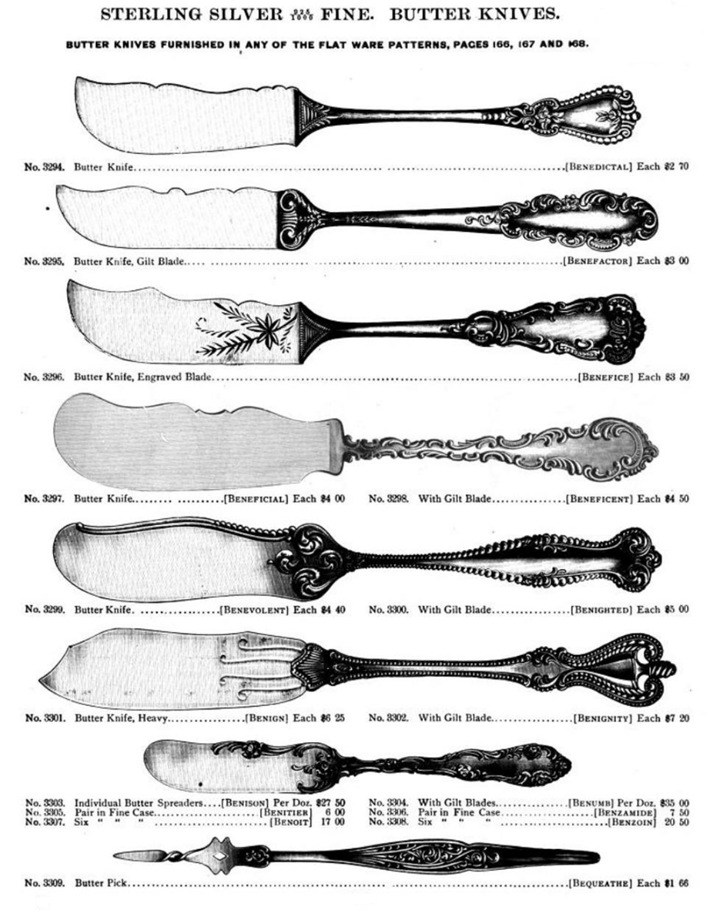
Multiple butter knives (top), a butter spreader (2nd from the bottom), and a butter pick (bottom). 1897.

The butter knife is a table knife intended for serving butter and applying it to bread and crackers ("spreading"). These utensils are also used for soft cheese, pâté, and moulded jelly when the more specialized knives are not available.

During the Victorian era, a multitude of knife-like implements were invented to handle butter. The Victorians distinguished:

- a butter spreader (also individual butter knife of the 1890s) It usually has a rounded point, so it does not tear the bread. Some spreaders are wider at the blade end. At 5 to 6 inches in length, this knife is the smallest one on the table;
- a serving butter knife (also master butter knife or simply "butter knife" in Victorian times) that was a dull-edged knife, usually sharp-pointed, often with a sabre shape, used only to serve out pats of butter from a central butter dish to individual diners' plates. These knives, dating back to the mid-18th century, were not used to spread the butter onto bread: this would contaminate the butter remaining in the butter dish when the next pat of butter was served. Rather, diners at the breakfast, the luncheon, and the informal dinner table used an individual butter knife to apply butter to their bread. At the end of the 19th century, the winter availability of fresh fruits in the United States greatly increased, reducing the need for pickle knives. As a result, some of these items were marketed as small master butter knives;
- a drill-like butter pick that dates back to the times when the butter was served inside chilled earthenware, so a pick was needed to pierce the butter and pull it out of the pot. By the mid-18th century picks were mostly replaced by the butter knives;
- a combination butter knife pick (see the illustration to the right).

== Etiquette ==
The use of bread knives in the modern formal dining is closely tied to the bread-and-butter plate (B&B). In the table setting, the spreader is laid on top of the B&B plate, either vertically, horizontally, or diagonally.

The availability of butter on the dining table varies with culture and setting and is closely related to the use of (otherwise dry) bread:

- at the formal dinners in Europe, B&B plate is optional;
- a formal dinner in the private residence of North America is expected to provide all the taste and texture with the dishes (for example, the melba toast can be served with soup) and thus the B&B plate is not used;
- a restaurant will typically provide bread so that the guests can cleanse the palate (and have something to do if the service is slow);
- a formal luncheon has few courses and thus the B&B plate is present;
- bread and butter are always served in informal setting (on the edge of the dinner plate is B&B plates are not used).

In the Middle Ages, the trenchers were made of bread, but were not considered food, except by the poor, the bread intended for eating was served separately, on the left side (where the B&B plate is set up nowadays). A small dish, 2 1/2 to 3 1/2) inches in diameter, was used to hold a mound ("pat") of butter, and was called a butter pat. During the Victorian specialization "craze", two separate plates were used, one for bread and one for butter. The tendency of simplification after the First World War caused the plates to be combined into a single modern B&B one.

If no butter spreaders are provided, a dinner knife may be used as an alternative.

== See also ==
- Cutlery
- Table setting

== Sources ==
- Schollander, Wendell; Schollander, Wes (2002). Forgotten Elegance: The Art, Artifacts, and Peculiar History of Victorian and Edwardian Entertaining in America. Bloomsbury Academic. ISBN 978-0-313-31685-2.
- Towle Mfg Company (1901). An Outline of the Life and Works of Col. Paul Revere: With a Partial Catalogue of Silverware Bearing His Name. Towle mfg. Company.
- Vogue (1969). Vogue's Book of Etiquette and Good Manners. Conde Nast. p. 240. ISBN 0-671-20115-8.
- Von Drachenfels, Susanne (2000). The Art of the Table: A Complete Guide to Table Setting, Table Manners, and Tableware. Simon & Schuster. ISBN 978-0-684-84732-0.
