= Bread-and-butter plate =

Small plate

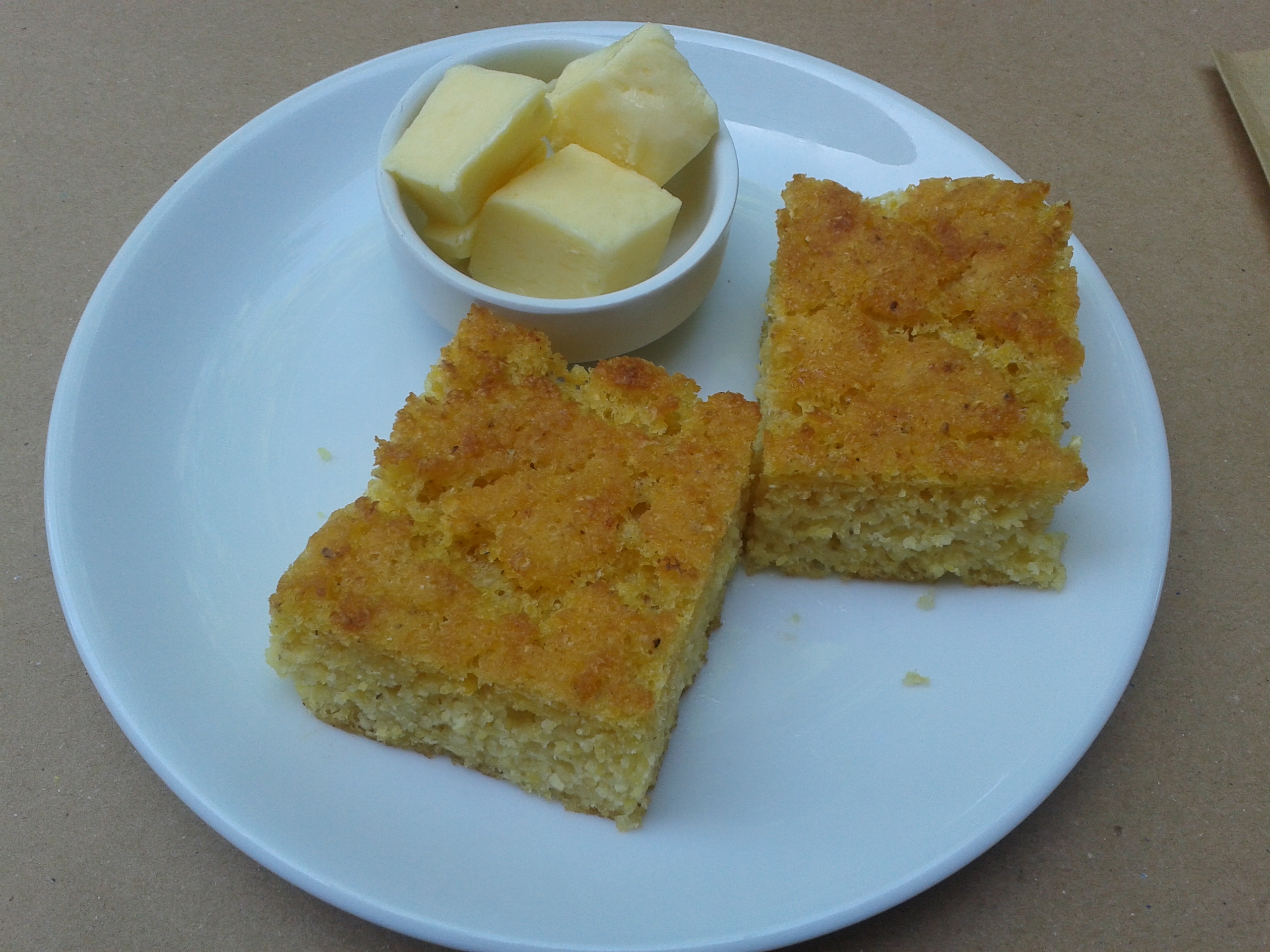
A plate with Turkish corn bread and butter

Bread-and-butter plate (B&B plate) is a small, about 6 inches in diameter, plate that holds bread and butter for an individual table setting. If a butter spreader is used, it is laid on top of the B&B plate, either vertically, horizontally, or diagonally.

The modern B&B plate is simply a smaller plate and has other uses, thus other names: side plate, quarter plate, cheese plate.

== Use ==
The availability of butter on the dining table varies with traditional culture and setting and is closely related to the use of (otherwise dry) bread:

- at the formal dinners in Europe, B&B plate is optional;
- a formal dinner in the private residence of North America is expected to provide all the taste and texture with the dishes (for example, the melba toast can be served with soup) and thus the B&B plate is not used;
- a restaurant will typically provide bread so that the guests can cleanse the palate (and have something to do if the service is slow);
- a formal luncheon has few courses and thus the B&B plate is present;
- bread and butter are always served in informal setting (on the edge of the dinner plate is B&B plates are not used).

In the Middle Ages, the trenchers were made of bread, but were not considered food, except by the poor, the bread intended for eating was served separately, on the left side (where the B&B plate is set up nowadays). A small dish, 2 1/2 to 3 1/2) inches in diameter, was used to hold a mound ("pat") of butter, and was called a butter pat. During the Victorian era specialization "craze", two separate plates were used, one for bread and one for butter.

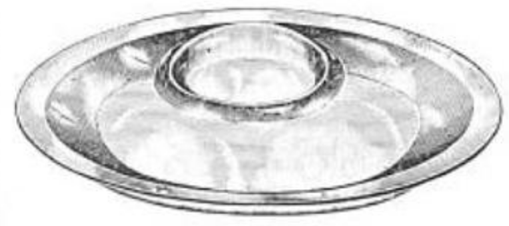
A "Pix Conservo" bread-and-butter plate promoted in 1918 as a part of war saving efforts (single plate simplified the service and enabled restaurant to ration the bread)

The tendency of simplification after the First World War caused the plates to be combined into a single modern B&B one. In 1918, a novel specialized bread plate with place for butter was marketed for restaurants as a way to enforce the wartime bread rationing and simplify service.

== See also ==
- Bread fork, a Victorian era utensil for placing bread onto an individual bread plate
- Butter dish, a shared dish for butter

== Sources ==
- "The new 'Pix Conservo' plate". New York Hotel Review: A Magazine for Hotels, Clubs, Caterers, Etc. XIII (1). 1918.
- Von Drachenfels, Susanne (2000). The Art of the Table: A Complete Guide to Table Setting, Table Manners, and Tableware. Simon & Schuster. ISBN 978-0-684-84732-0.
