= Bread knife =

Serrated knife used for cutting bread

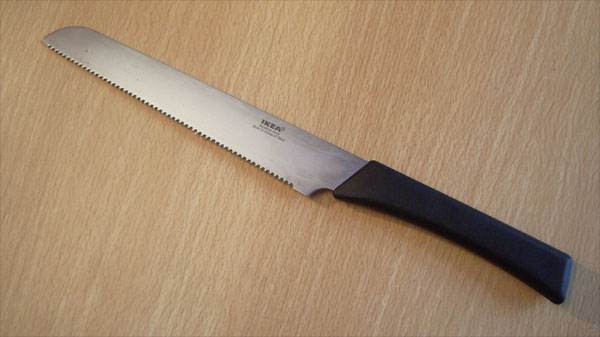
A modern bread knife

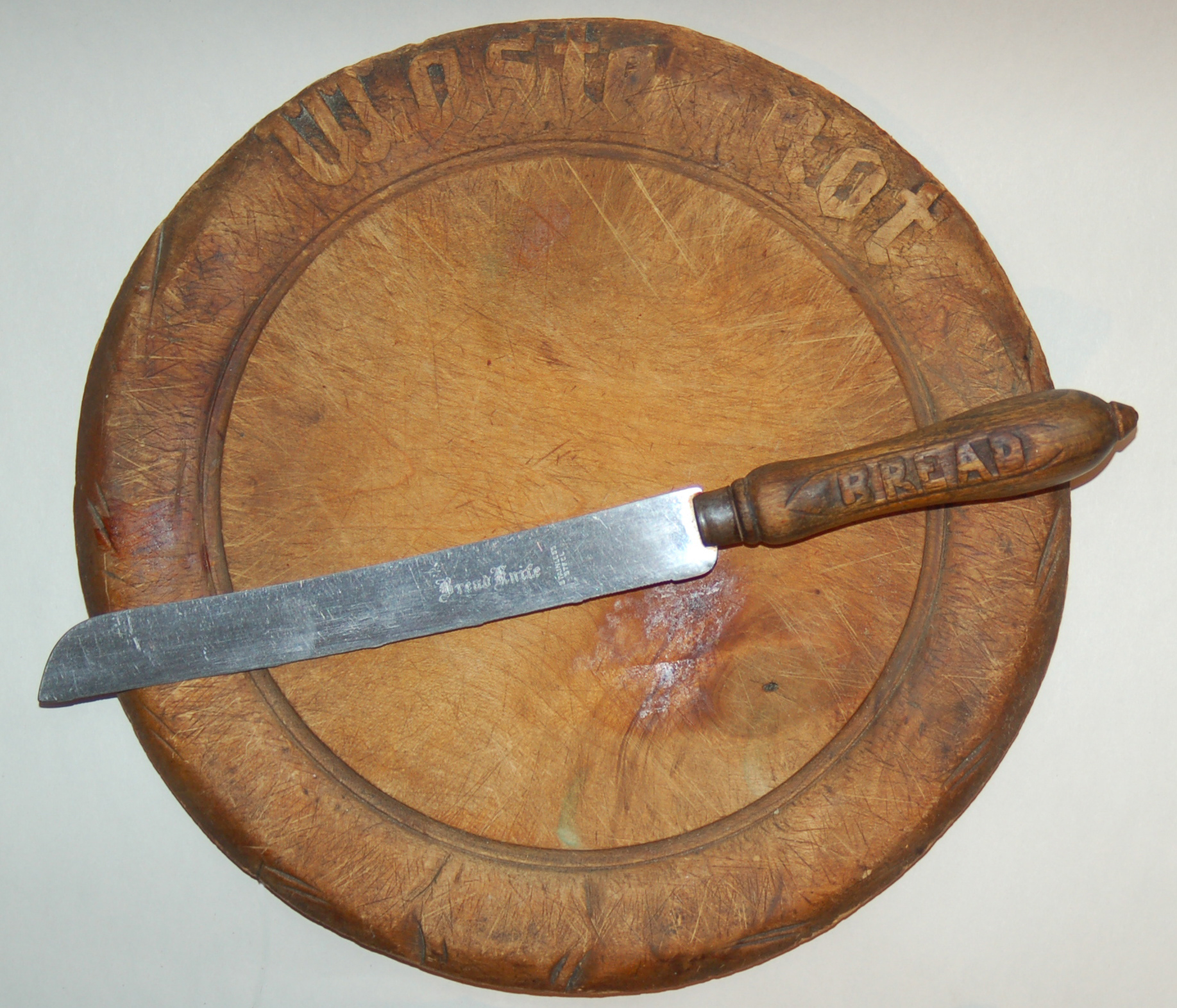
19th century cutting board with a modern bread knife

Bread knives are used for cutting bread and are one of many kitchen knives used by cooks. The serrated blades of bread knives are able to cut soft bread without crushing it.

== History ==
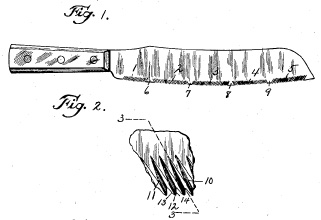
Burns patent bread knife, 1921

One such knife was exhibited at the World's Columbian Exposition in 1893 in Chicago by the Friedrich Dick company (Esslingen, Germany). One design was patented in the United States by Joseph E. Burns of Syracuse, New York, in 1919, predating the invention of automatically sliced bread by about ten years. His knife had sections of grooves or serrations, inclined with respect to the axis of the blade, that form individual small cutting edges which were perpendicular to the blade and thus cut without the excessive normal pressure required of a scalloped blade and without the horizontal force required by positive-raked teeth that would dig into the bread like a wood saw. There were also sections of grooves with the opposite direction of inclination, separated by a section of smooth blade, and the knife thus cut cleanly in both directions in both hard and soft bread.

== Measurement ==
Bread knives are usually between 15 and 35 cm (6 and 14 in). An offset serrated knife uses an offset handle to ensure the cook's knuckles will not touch the cutting surface when the blade has cut all of the way through the food.

== See also ==
- Bread fork, a now-forgotten Victorian utensil
