= Plate (dishware) =

Flat vessel on which food can be served

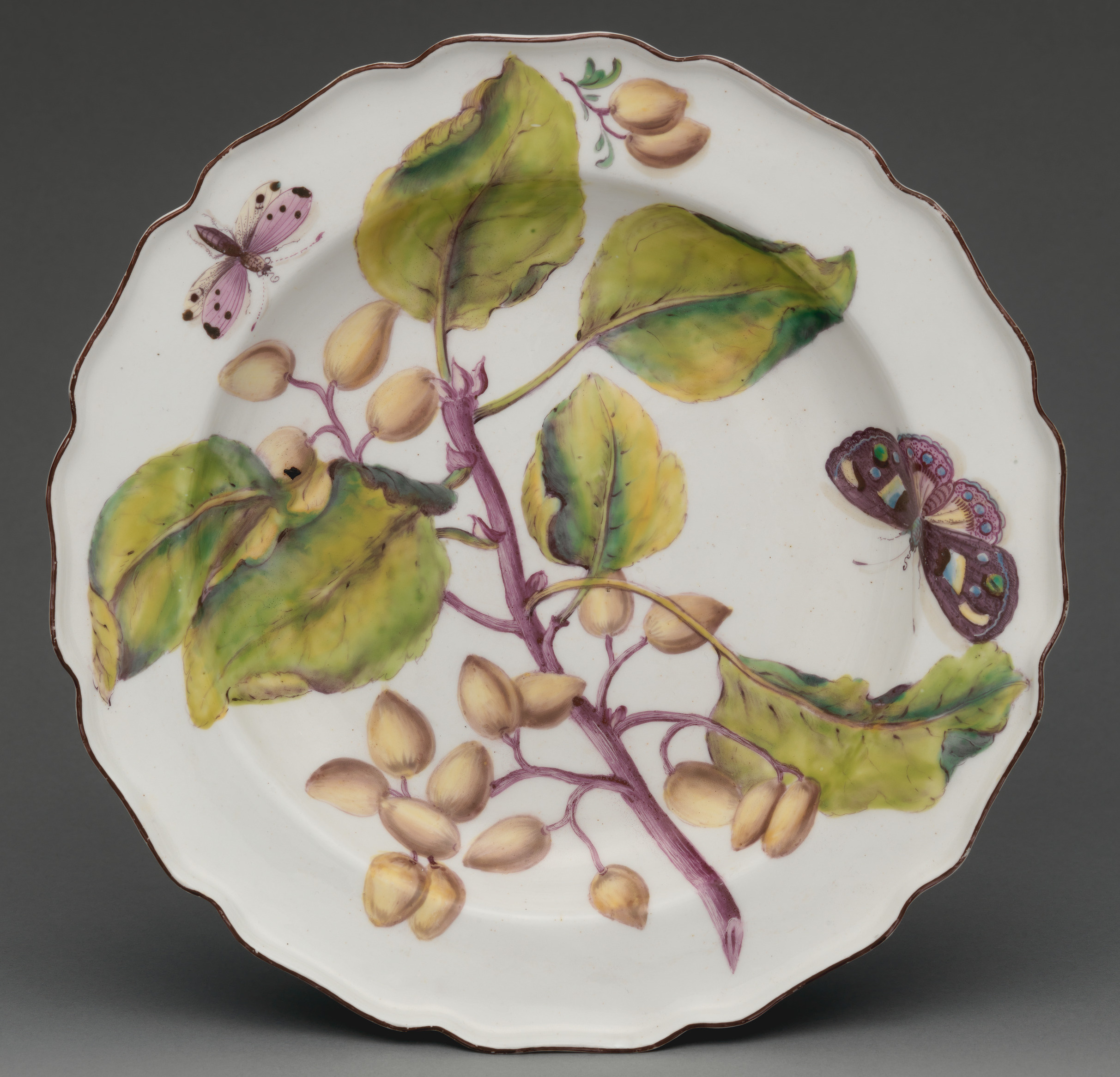
Chelsea porcelain botanical plate with spray of fruiting Indian bean tree; circa 1755; overall: 4 × 23.2 × 23.2 cm; Metropolitan Museum of Art

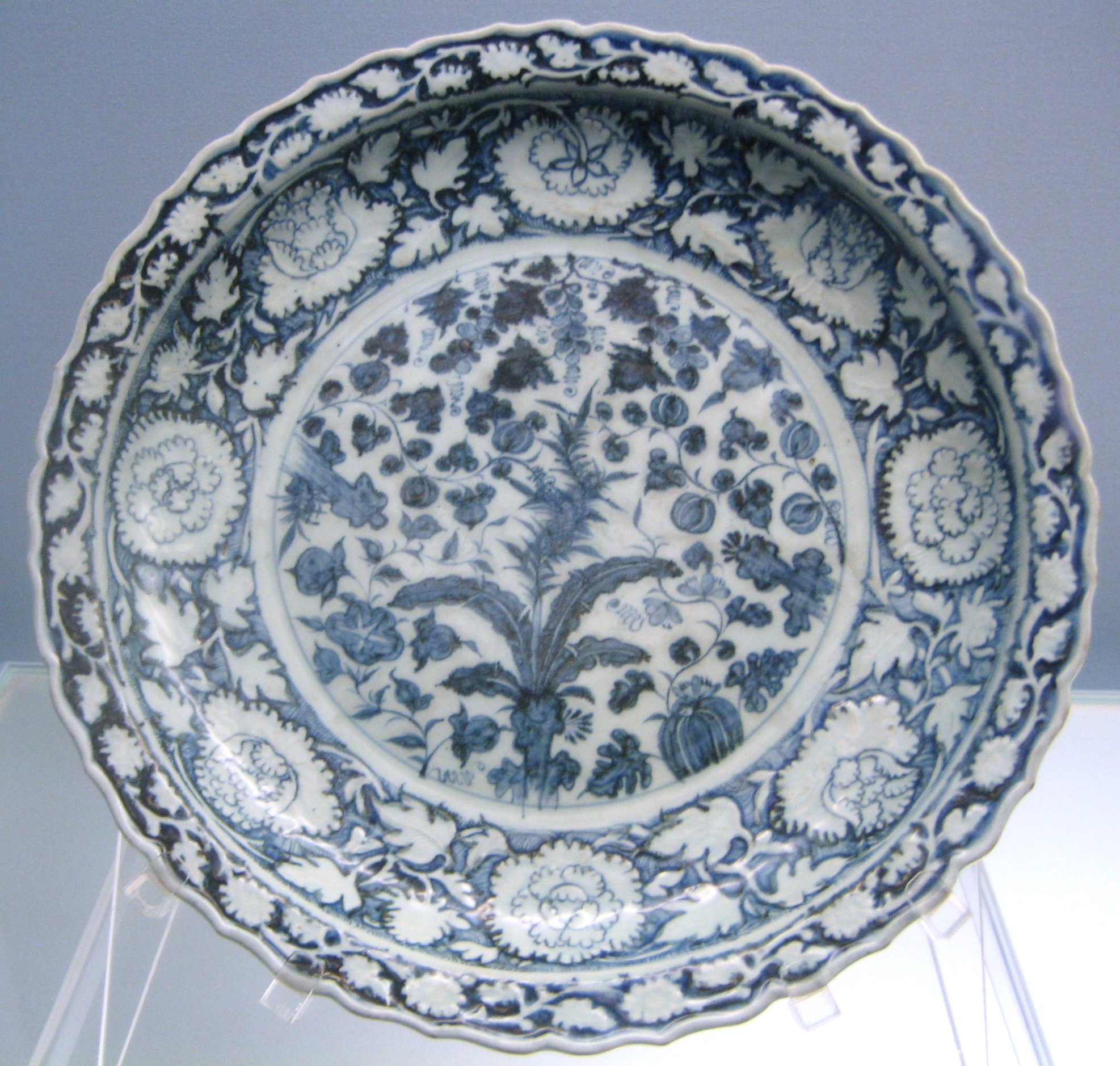
Typical Chinese plate or dish shape, with narrow lip. Jingdezhen ware, Yuan dynasty, 1271–1368

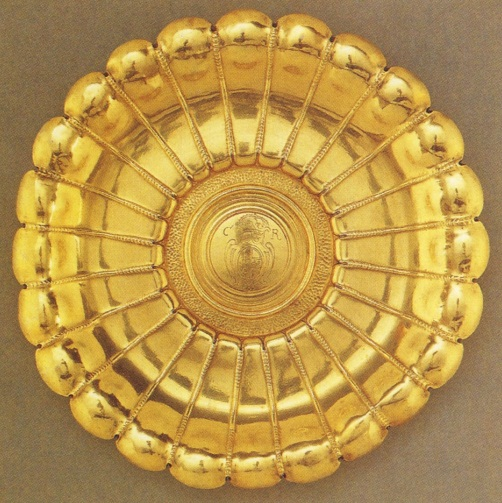
Silver-gilt plate, 1605, from the dinner service of Constance of Austria. Probably used as a charger to place other tableware on

A plate is a broad, mainly flat vessel on which food can be served. A plate can also be used for ceremonial or decorative purposes. Most plates are circular, but they may be any shape, or made of any water, or shatter resistant material. Generally plates are raised round the edges, either by a curving up, or a wider lip or raised portion. Vessels with no lip, especially if they have a more rounded profile, are likely to be considered as bowls or dishes, as are very large vessels with a plate shape. Plates are dishware, and tableware. Plates in wood, pottery and metal go back into antiquity in many cultures.

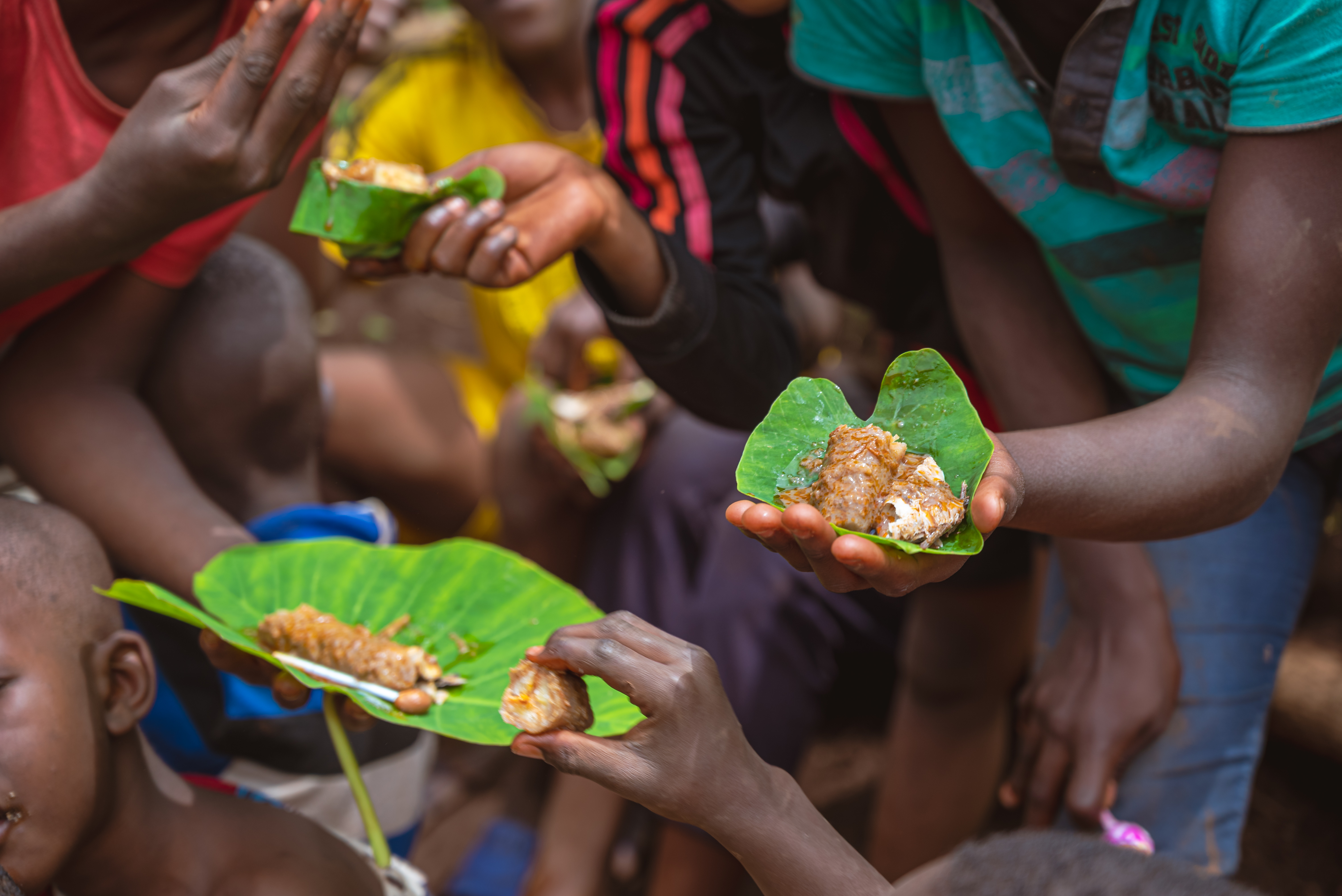
Leaf plates in Cameroon.

In Western culture and many other cultures, the plate is the typical vessel from which food is eaten and on which it is served, provided the food is not too high in liquid content, its primary alternative is the bowl. Some South Asian and Southeast Asian cultures use leaf plates made from the leaves of a variety of plants, including the banana leaf, pandan leaf, sometimes using underlying paper. Parts of the bamboo plant, like sections of bamboo tubes, bambuseae leaves, bamboo shoot skin, and the paper (cf. Kaishi and Washi) are also used as plates in East Asian cultures.

== Design ==
=== Shape ===
A plate is typically composed of:

- The well, the bottom of the plate, where food is placed.
- The lip, the flattish raised outer part of the plate (sometimes wrongly called the rim). Its width in proportion to the well can vary greatly. It usually has a slight upwards slope, or is parallel with the base, as is typical in larger dishes and traditional Chinese shapes. Not all plates have a distinct lip.
- The rim, the outer edge of the piece; often decorated, for example with gilding.
- The base, the underside.

The usual wide and flat European raised lip is derived from old European metalwork plate shapes; Chinese ceramic plates usually just curve up at the edges, or have a narrow lip. A completely flat serving plate, only practical for dry foods, may be called a trencher, especially if in wood.

=== Materials ===
Plates are commonly made from ceramic materials such as bone china, porcelain, earthenware, and stoneware, as well as other traditional materials like glass, wood, or metal; occasionally, stone has been used. Despite a range of plastics and other modern materials, ceramics and other traditional materials remain the most common, except for specialized uses such as plates for young children. Porcelain and bone china were once luxurious materials but today can be afforded by most of the world's population. Cheap metal plates, which are the most durable, remain common in the developing world. Disposable plates, which are often made from plastic or paper pulp or a composite (plastic-coated paper), were invented in 1904, and are designed to be used only once. Also melamine resin or tempered glass such as Corelle can be used.

=== Size and type ===
As food availability increased, so did plate sizes. The increase in the diameter of a typical dinner plate is estimated as 65% since 1000 AD.

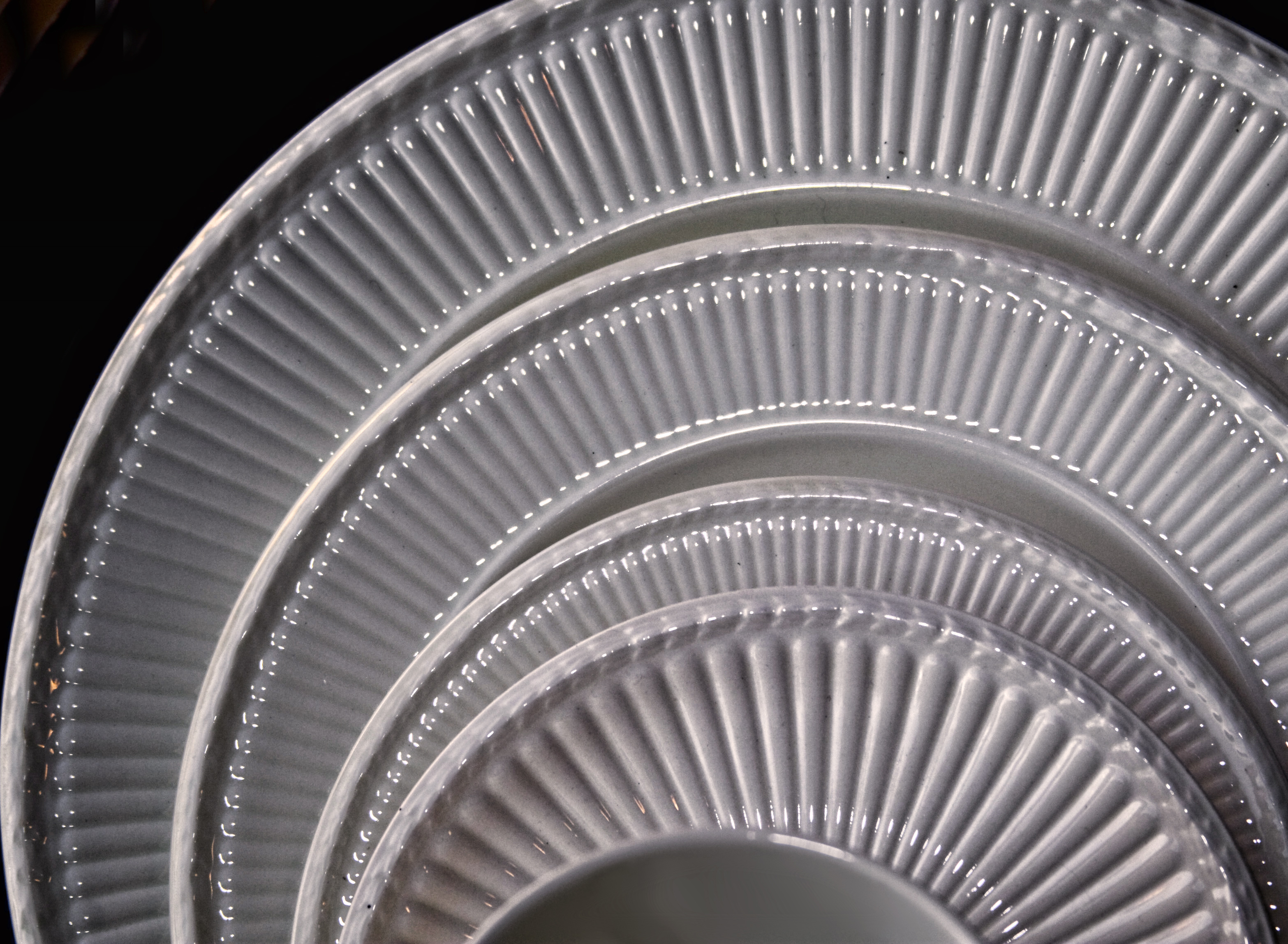
Sizes from dinner plate (bottom of stack) to saucer (top of stack)

Modern plates for serving food come in a variety of sizes and types, such as:

- Dinner plate (also full plate, meat plate, joint plate): large, 9–13 inches (23–33 cm) in diameter; only buffet/serving plates are larger. This is the main (at times only) individual plate. During its disappearance in Europe that happened with the fall of the Roman Empire, trencher plates made of bread (or wood) were used. Regular plates returned to fashion at the French court under Francis I of France around 1536.
- Entrée plate (also half plate, dessert plate, fish plate) has a diameter of 8.5 inches (22 cm) and is used for hors d'oeuvre, fish, entrée, or a dessert.
- Dessert plate (also sweet plate, half plate, fruit plate) has a diameter of 8 inches (20 cm), usually is substituted by an entrée plate
- Side plate (also bread and butter plate, B&B plate, quarter plate, cheese plate) has a diameter of 6 to 7 inches (15 to 18 cm), also used as an underplate for soup bowl
- Salad plate can be either round, 7 to 8.5 inches (18 to 22 cm) in diameter, or intended to be positioned snugly to the right of a full plate, the latter usually has a crescent shape (hence another name, a crescent plate).
- Tea saucer is a small plate with an indentation for a cup and a diameter of 6 inches (15 cm). A demi-tasse saucer, or coffee saucer is 4.5 inches (11 cm) in diameter.
- Soup plate has a diameter of 9 inches (23 cm), a much deeper well and wide rim ("lip"). If the lip is lacking, as often seen in contemporary tableware, it is a "soup bowl". May also be used for desserts.
- Cereal bowl (also oatmeal bowl, cereal plate), at 7.5 inches (19 cm) in diameter, used for porridge and breakfast cereal, as well as milk pudding, compote, apple pie with custard sauce
- Luncheon plate, typically 9–9.5 inches (23–24 cm) in diameter, fell out of popularity at the end of 19th century, together with the luncheons for ladies.
- Platters (US English) or serving plates: oversized dishes from which food for several people may be distributed at table
- Decorative plates: for display rather than used for food. Commemorative plates have designs reflecting a particular theme.
- Charger (also a buffet plate, cover plate, lay plate, place plate, all names are due to the various uses of this large plate in the past and in the present): a plate typically placed under a separate plate used to hold food, largest and therefore most expensive plate in the set at 11–14 inches (28–36 cm) in diameter with an 8–9 inches (20–23 cm) well. The antique service plates were smaller, with 9 inches (23 cm) size and a 6–6.5 inches (15–17 cm) well, due to different use: modern etiquette allows the use of the service plates for the main course in an informal dining arrangement (thus the larger well), while in the old times (and the modern formal dining) the service plate is only used as a base for the appetizer and soup.

Plates can be any shape, but almost all have a rim to prevent food from falling off the edge. They are often white or off-white, but can be any color, including patterns and artistic designs. Many are sold in sets of identical plates, so everyone at a table can have matching tableware. Styles include:

- Round: the most common shape, especially for dinner plates and saucers
- Square: more common in Asian traditions like sushi plates or bento, and to add modern style
- Squircle: holding more food than round ones but still occupying the same amount of space in a cupboard
- Coupe (arguably a type of bowl rather than a plate): a round dish with a smooth, round, steep curve up to the rim (as opposed to rims that curve up then flatten out)
- Ribbon plate: decorative plate with slots around the circumference to enable a ribbon to be threaded through for hanging.

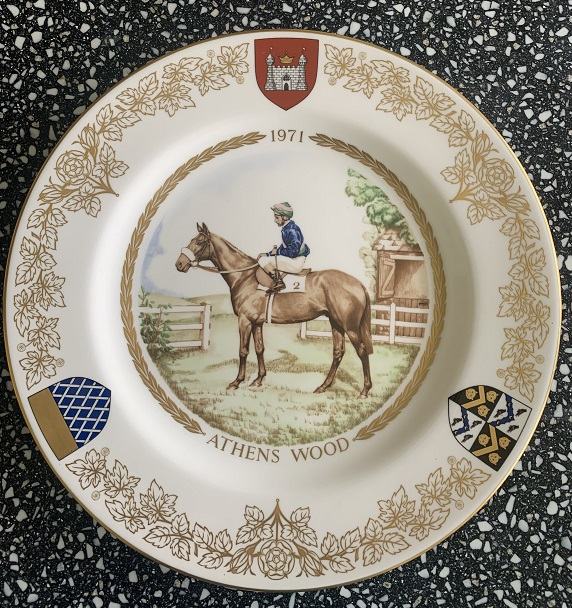
Commemorative plate by Spode (1971) depicting winner of the St Leger Stakes, Athens Wood

== Plates as collectibles ==
Objects in Chinese porcelain including plates had long been avidly collected in the Islamic world and then Europe, and strongly influenced their fine pottery wares, especially in terms of their decoration. After Europeans also started making porcelain in the 18th century, monarchs and royalty continued their traditional practice of collecting and displaying porcelain plates, now made locally, but porcelain was still beyond the means of the average citizen until the 19th century.

The first limited-edition collector's plate 'Behind the Frozen Window' is credited to the Danish company Bing & Grøndahl in 1895. Christmas plates became very popular with many European companies producing them most notably Royal Copenhagen in 1910, and a Rosenthal series which began in 1910.

Souvenir plates
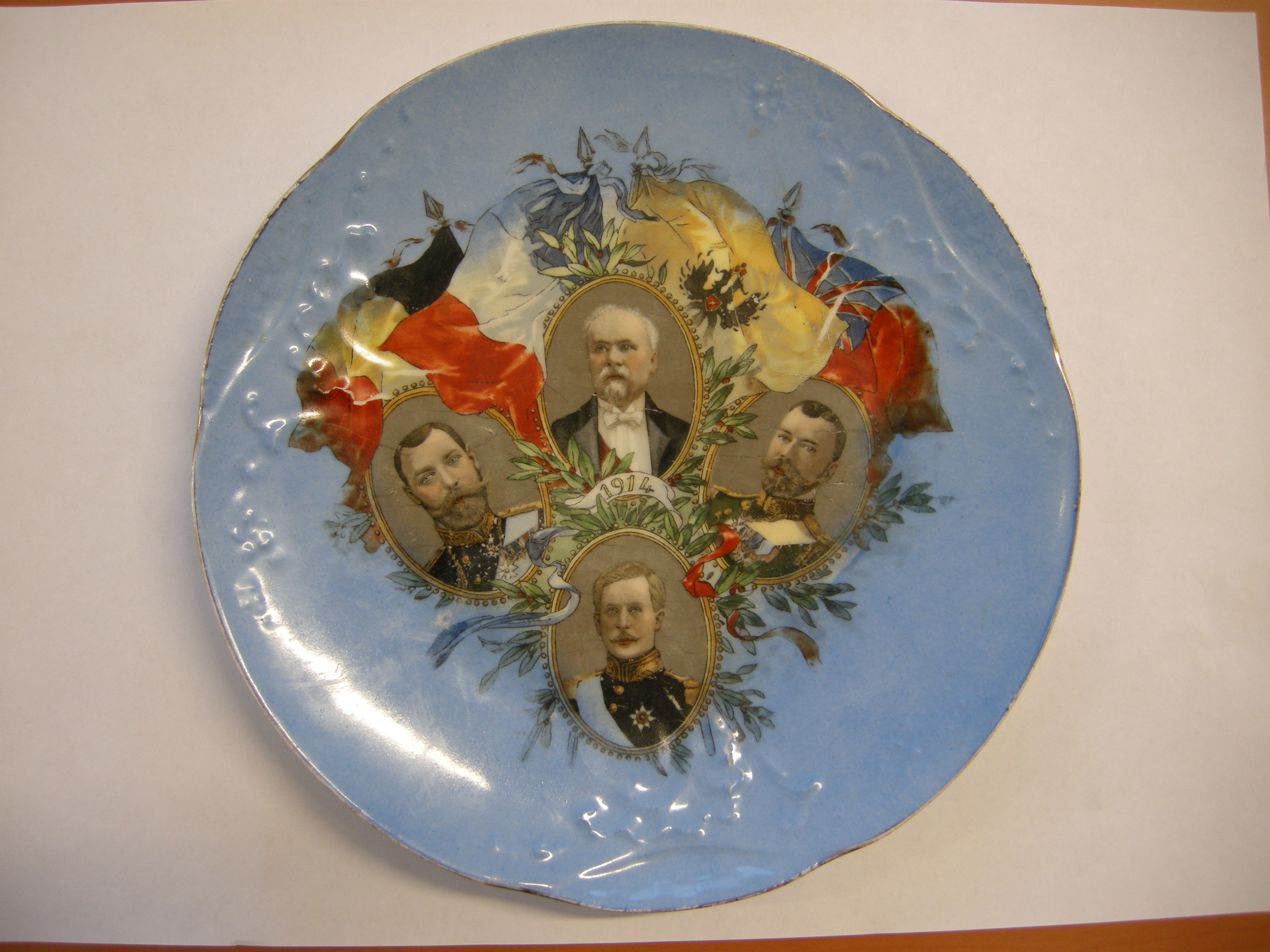
Collectable plate from World War I-era France, featuring portraits of Poincaré, George V, Nicholas II and Albert I.

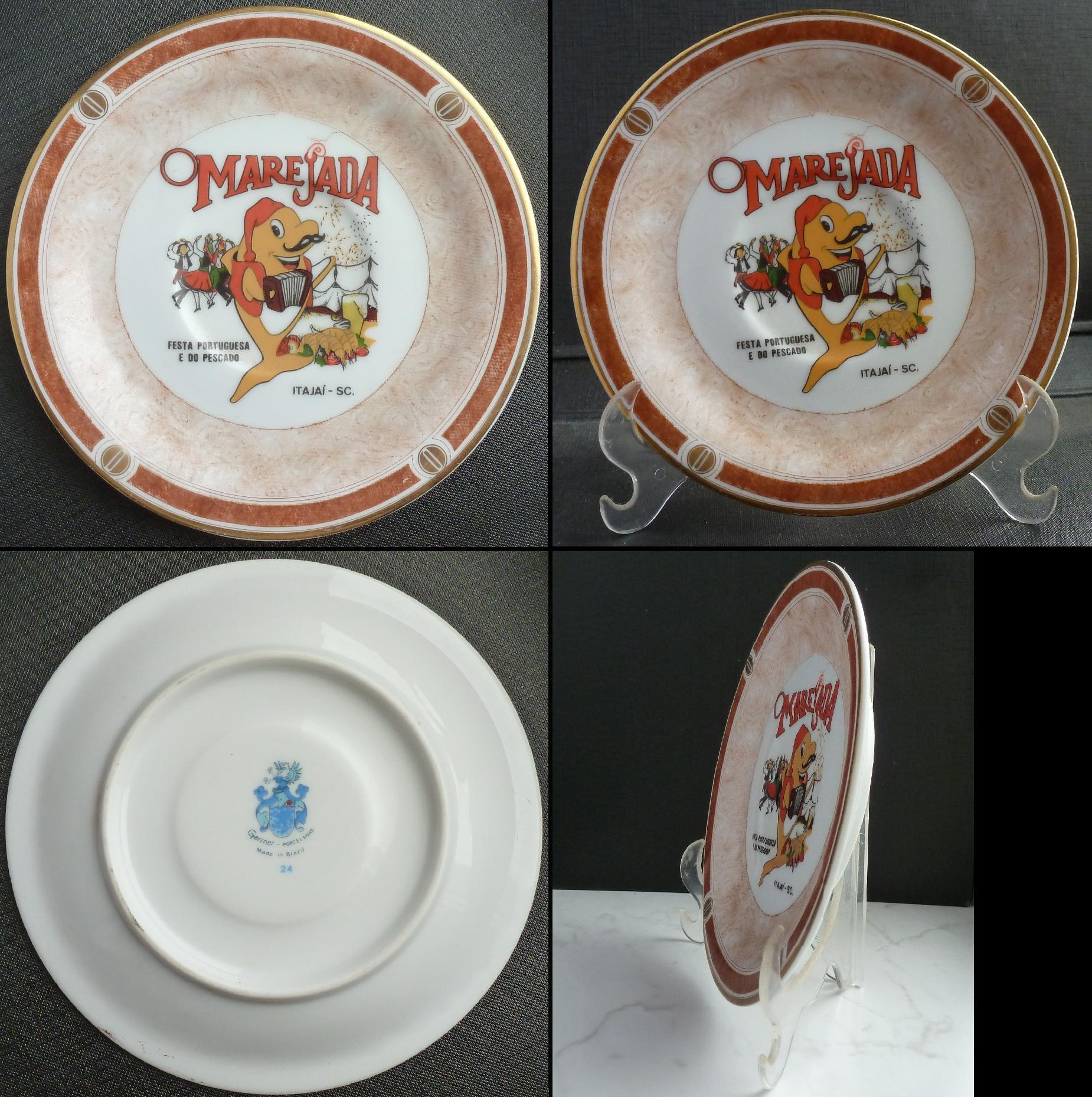
Souvenir plate of Marejada fiesta was made in Itajaí, Brazil, by Germer Porcelanas Finas SA

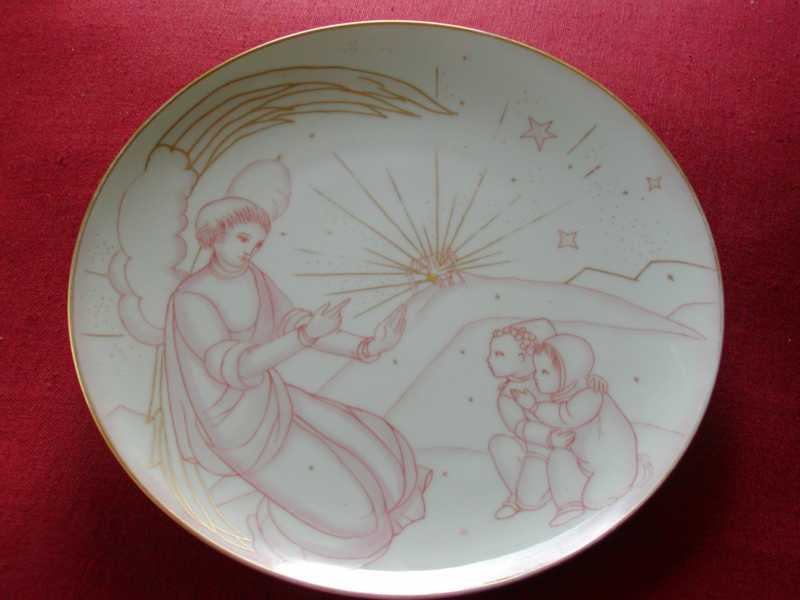
Christmas 1937 plate by Königliche Porzellan Manufaktur, Berlin

== Gallery ==
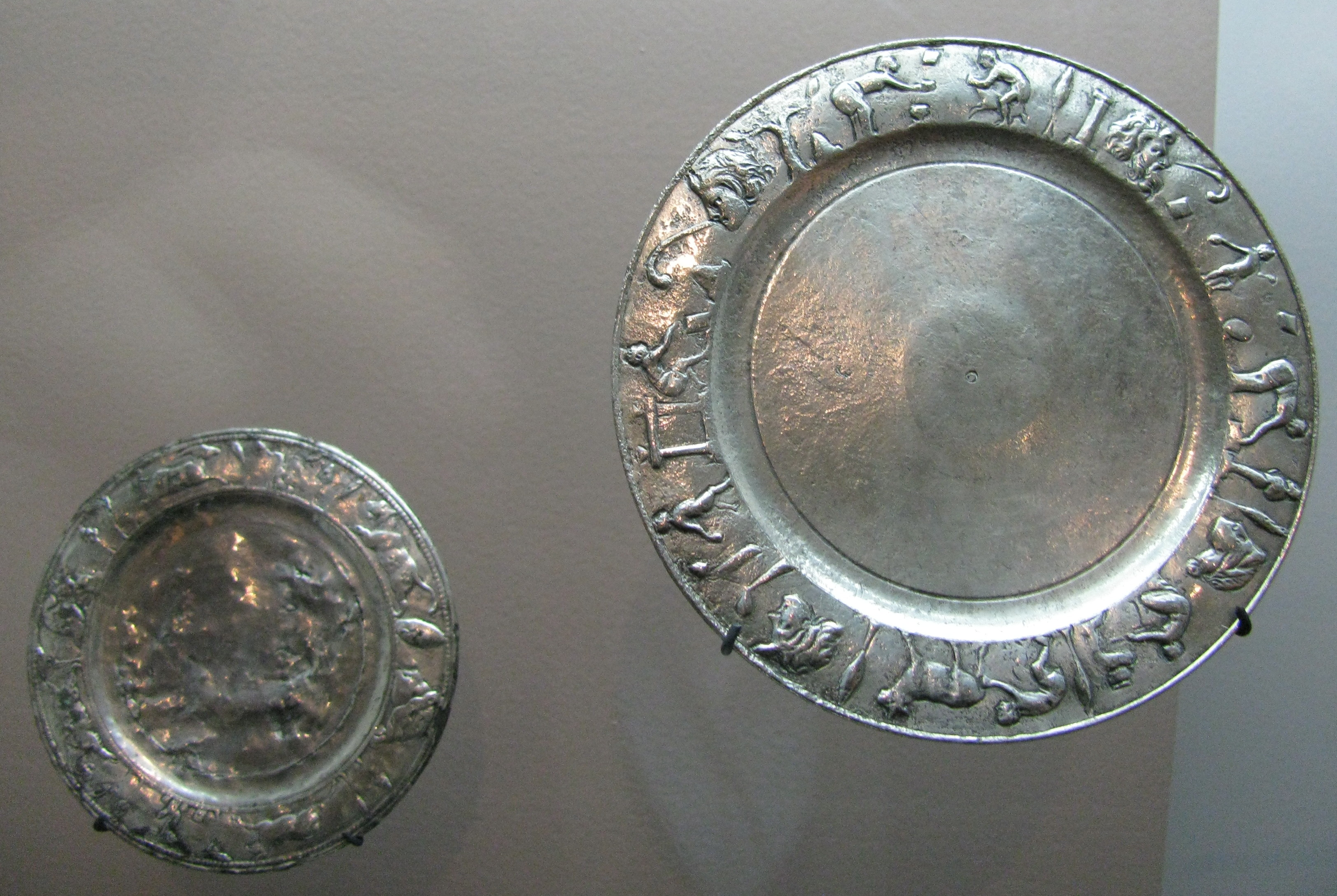
Gallo-Roman silver plates in the Gallo-Roman Museum of Lyon-Fourvière (Lyon, France)

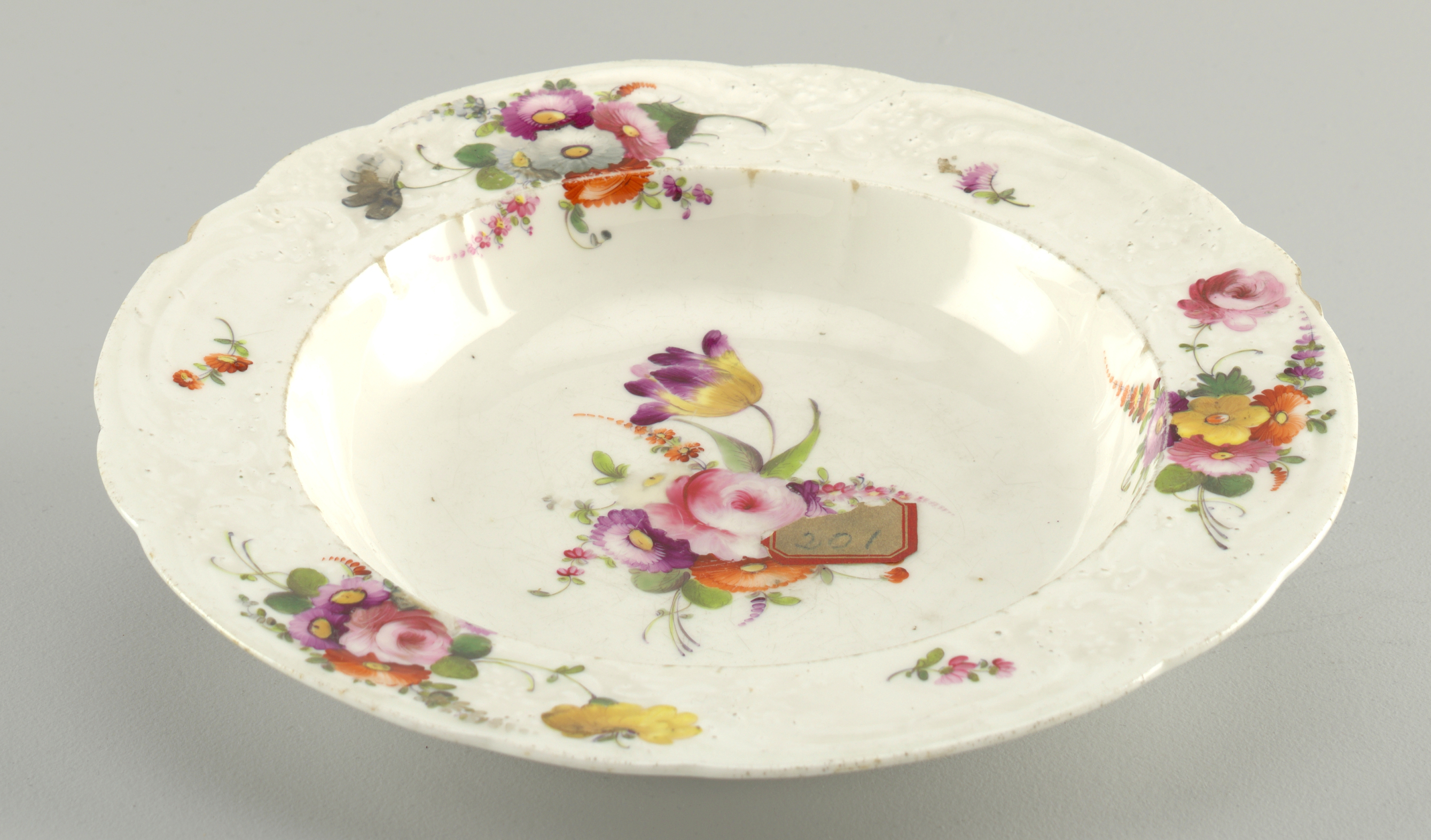
Soup plate, 19th-century Meissen porcelain

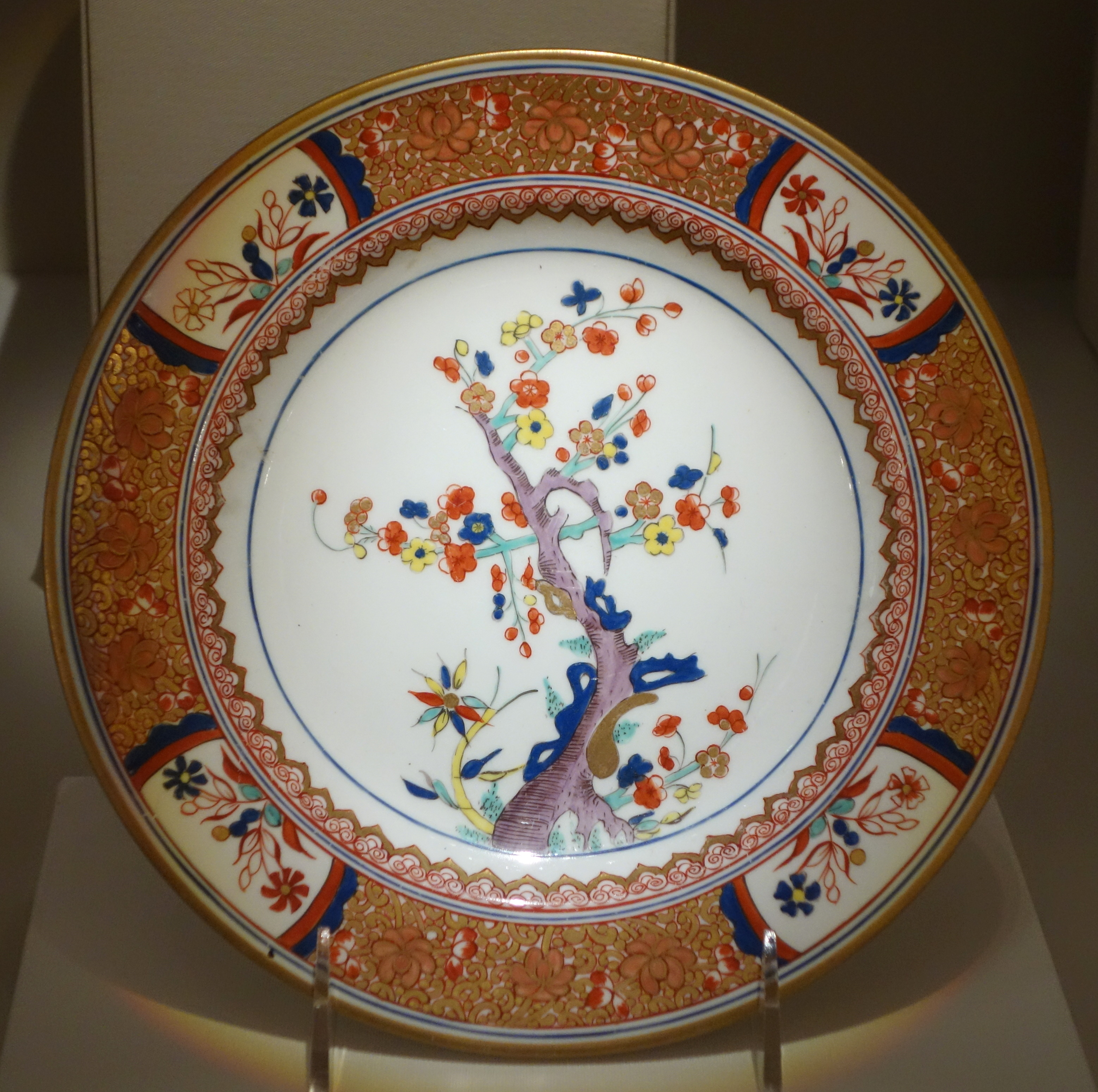
Spode plate, Stoke-on-Trent, England c.1792-94

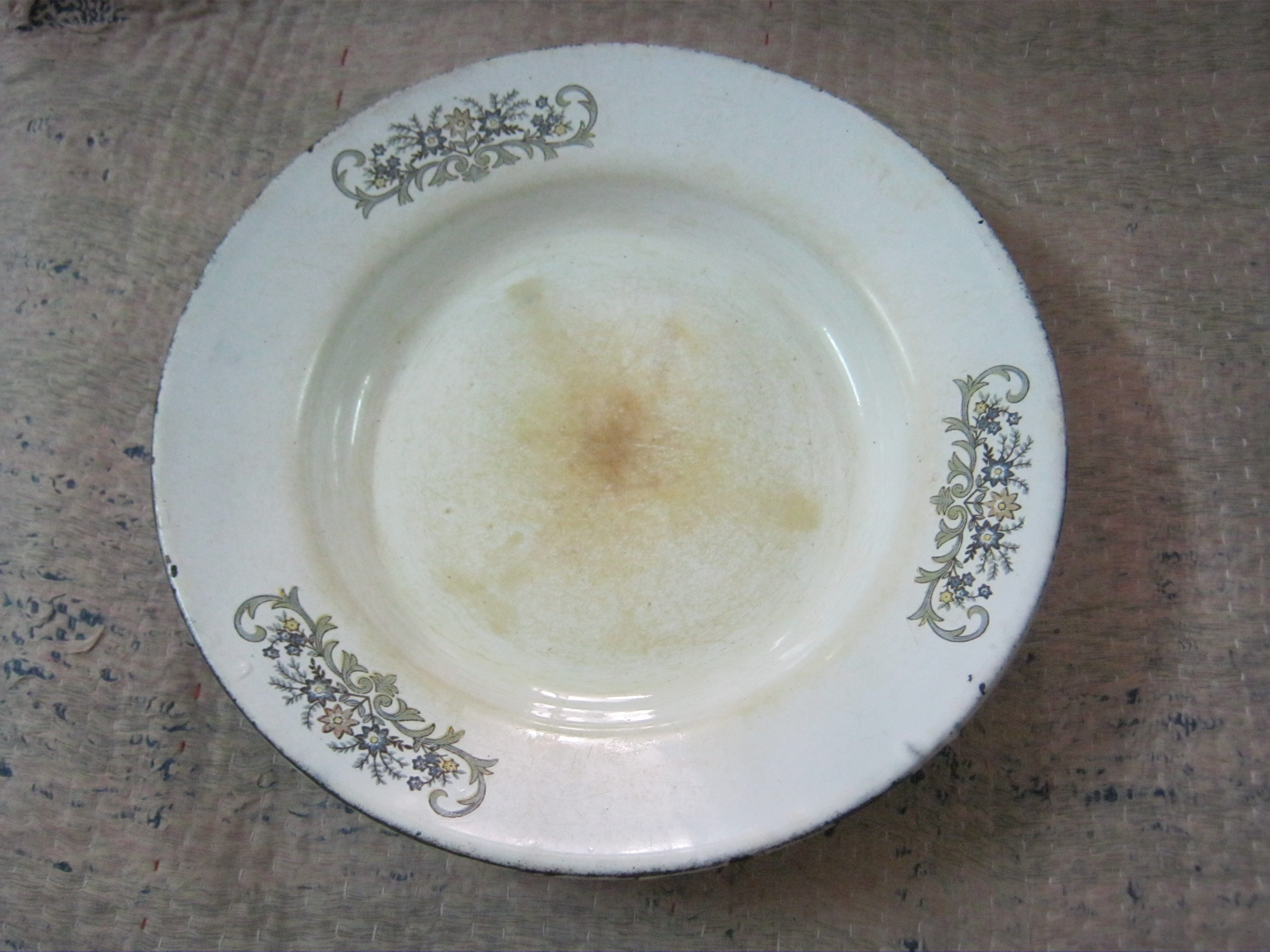
Vitreous enamel on metal

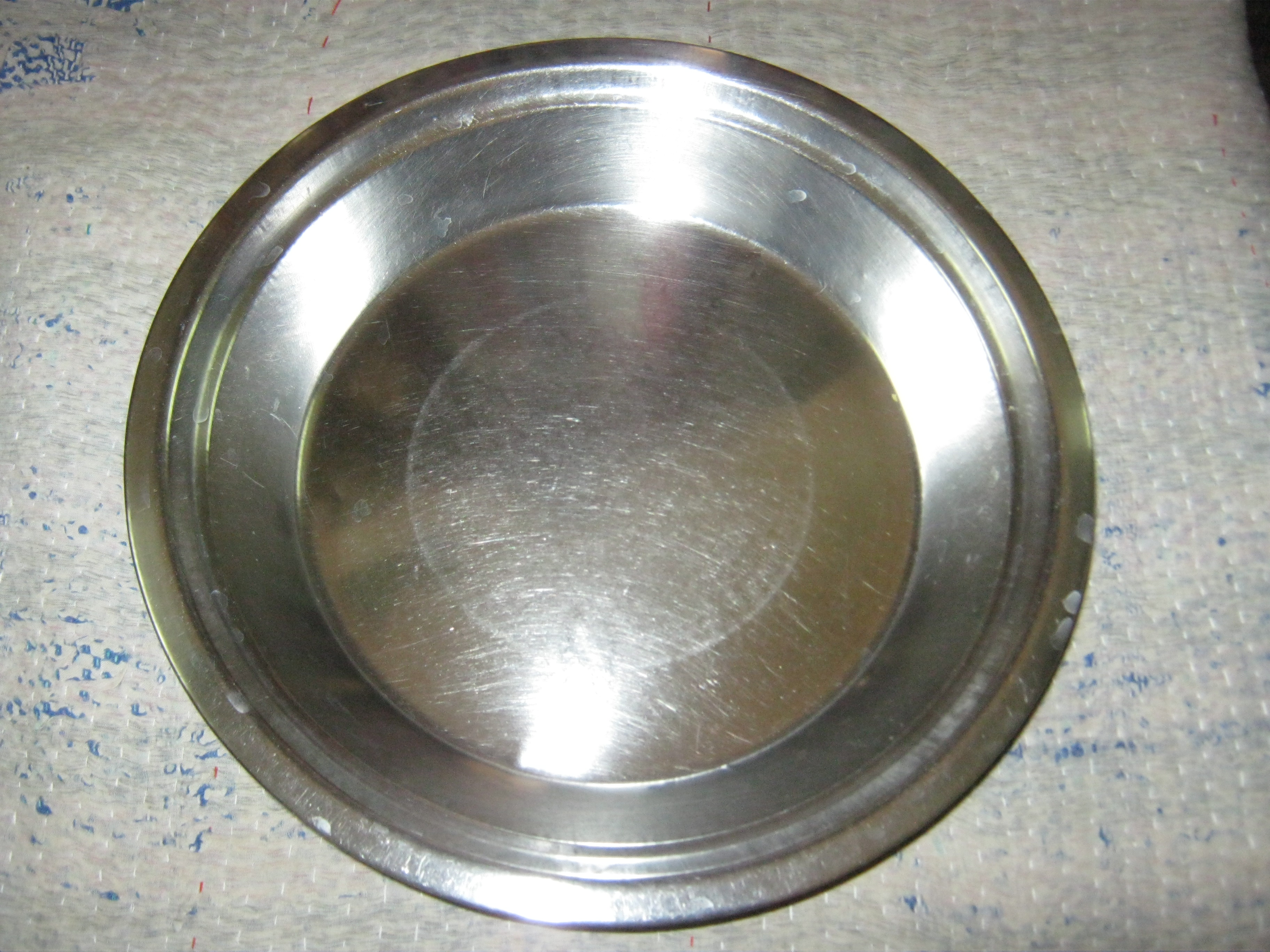
Steel Plate

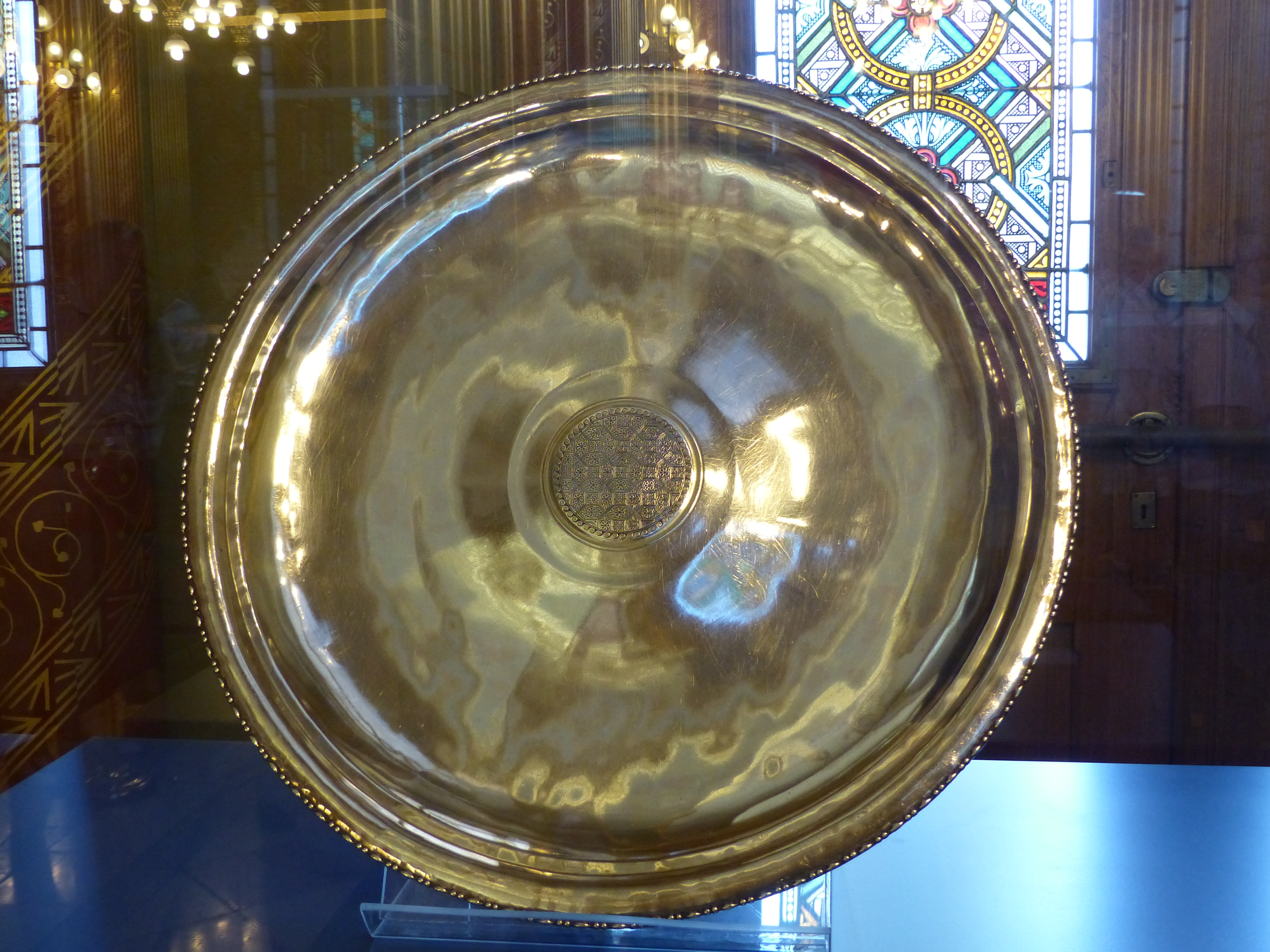
Geometric plate Seuso Treasure

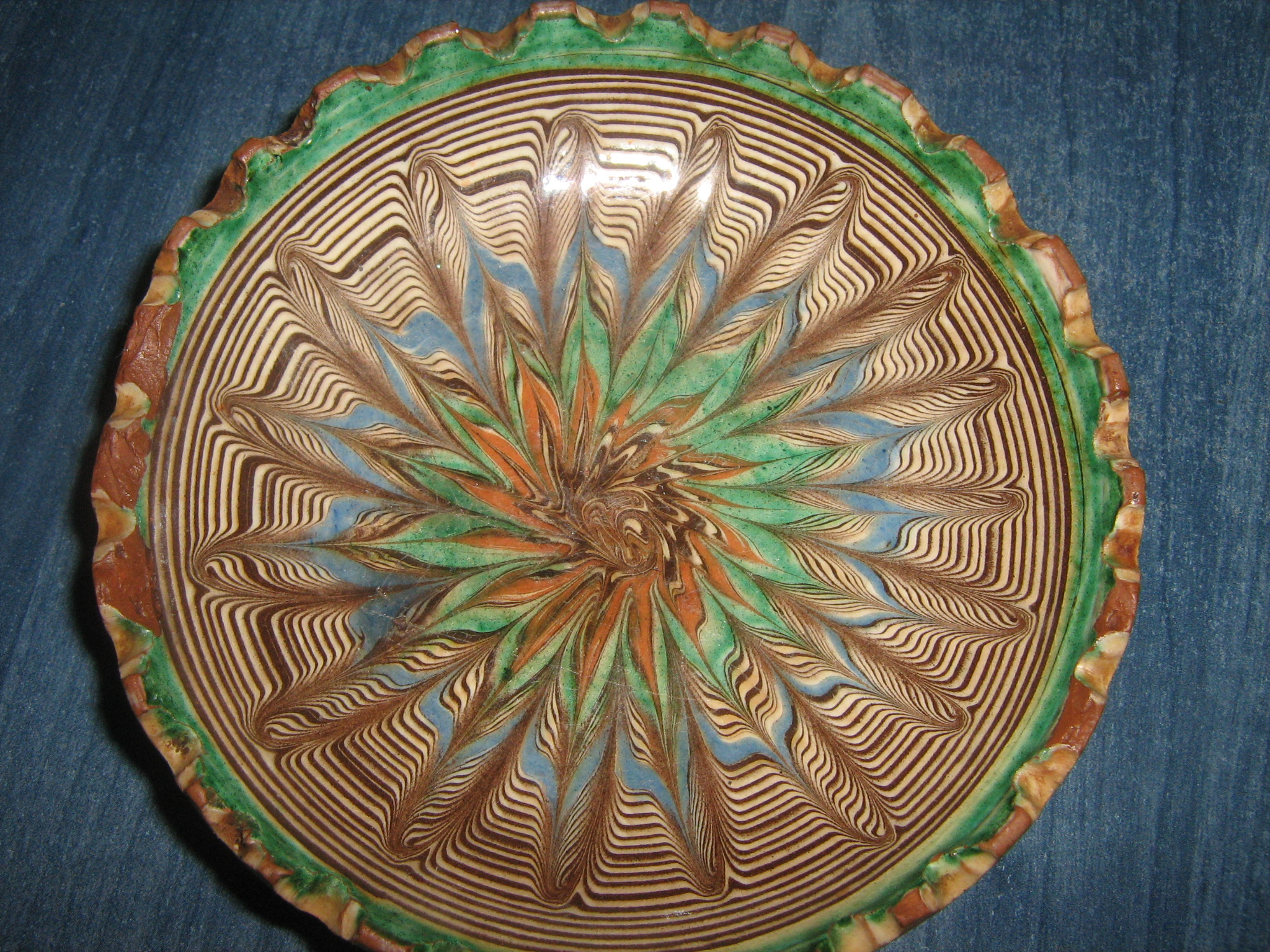
Romanian decorative plate featuring a traditional model

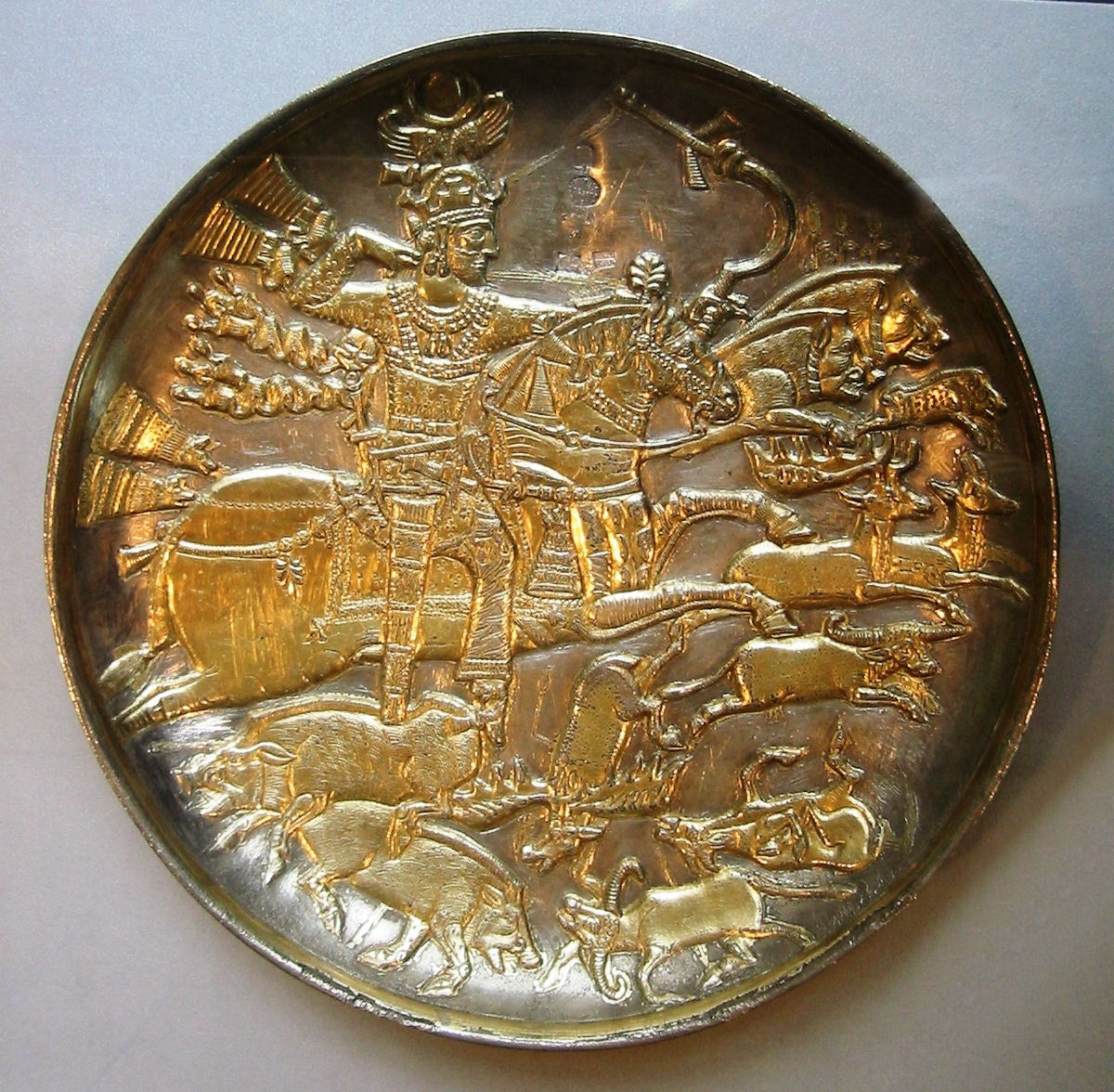
Persian plate or dish featuring a king hunting

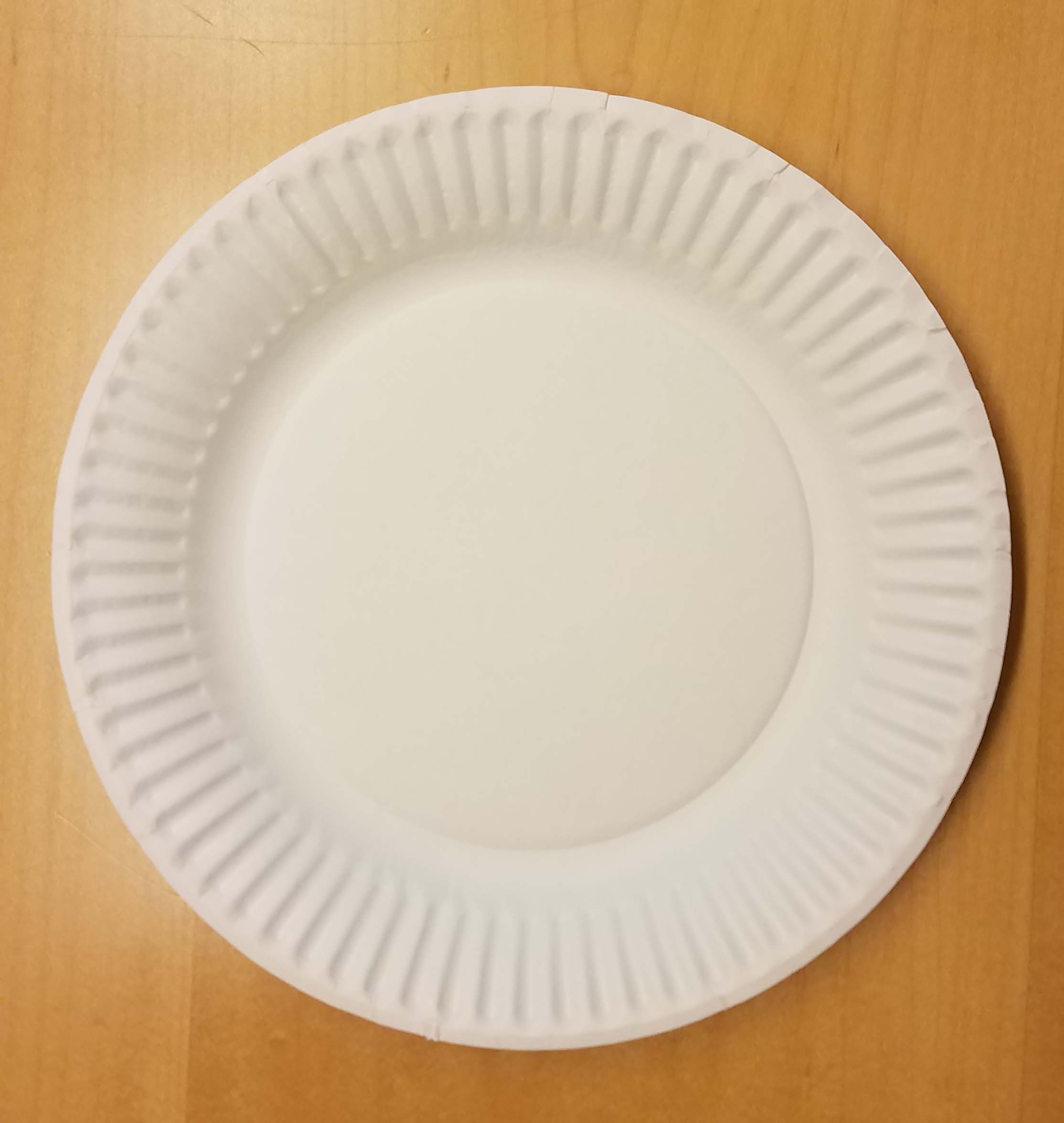
A typical paper plate

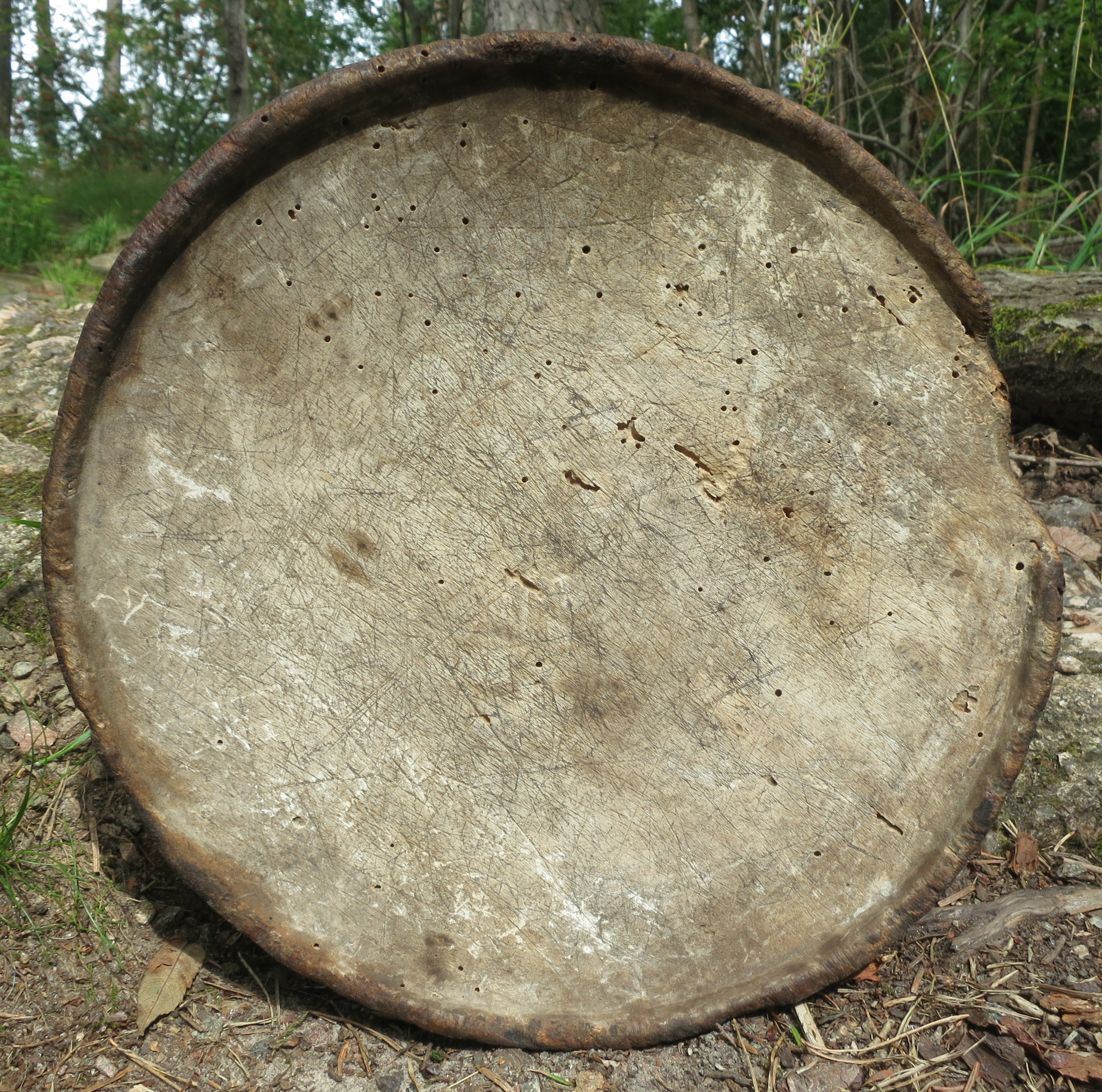
Late 19th century wooden plate from Kungälv municipality, Sweden

== Sources ==
- Wansink, B; Wansink, C S (23 March 2010). "The largest Last Supper: depictions of food portions and plate size increased over the millennium". International Journal of Obesity. 34 (5): 943–944. doi:10.1038/ijo.2010.37. eISSN 1476-5497. ISSN 0307-0565. PMID 20308996. S2CID 25106530. SSRN 2474274.
- Condrasky, Marge; Ledikwe, Jenny H.; Flood, Julie E.; Rolls, Barbara J. (August 2007). "Chefs' Opinions of Restaurant Portion Sizes". Obesity. 15 (8): 2086–2094. doi:10.1038/oby.2007.248. eISSN 1930-739X. ISSN 1930-7381. PMID 17712127. S2CID 37977315.
- Dias, Peter (1996). The Steward. Orient Blackswan. pp. 63–. ISBN 9788125003250.
- Von Drachenfels, Suzanne (8 November 2000). "Plates: Piece by piece". The Art of the Table: A Complete Guide to Table Setting, Table Manners, and Tableware. Simon and Schuster. pp. 81–95. ISBN 978-0-684-84732-0.
- The Bradford Book of Collector's Plates 1987, Brian J. Taylor, Chicago, IL
- Kora, Aruna Jyothi (2019). "Leaves as dining plates, food wraps and food packing material: Importance of renewable resources in Indian culture". Bulletin of the National Research Centre. 43 (1) 205. doi:10.1186/s42269-019-0231-6. ISSN 2522-8307.

SN:18949/700002376186
