= Bread fork =

Victorian-era utensil for serving bread

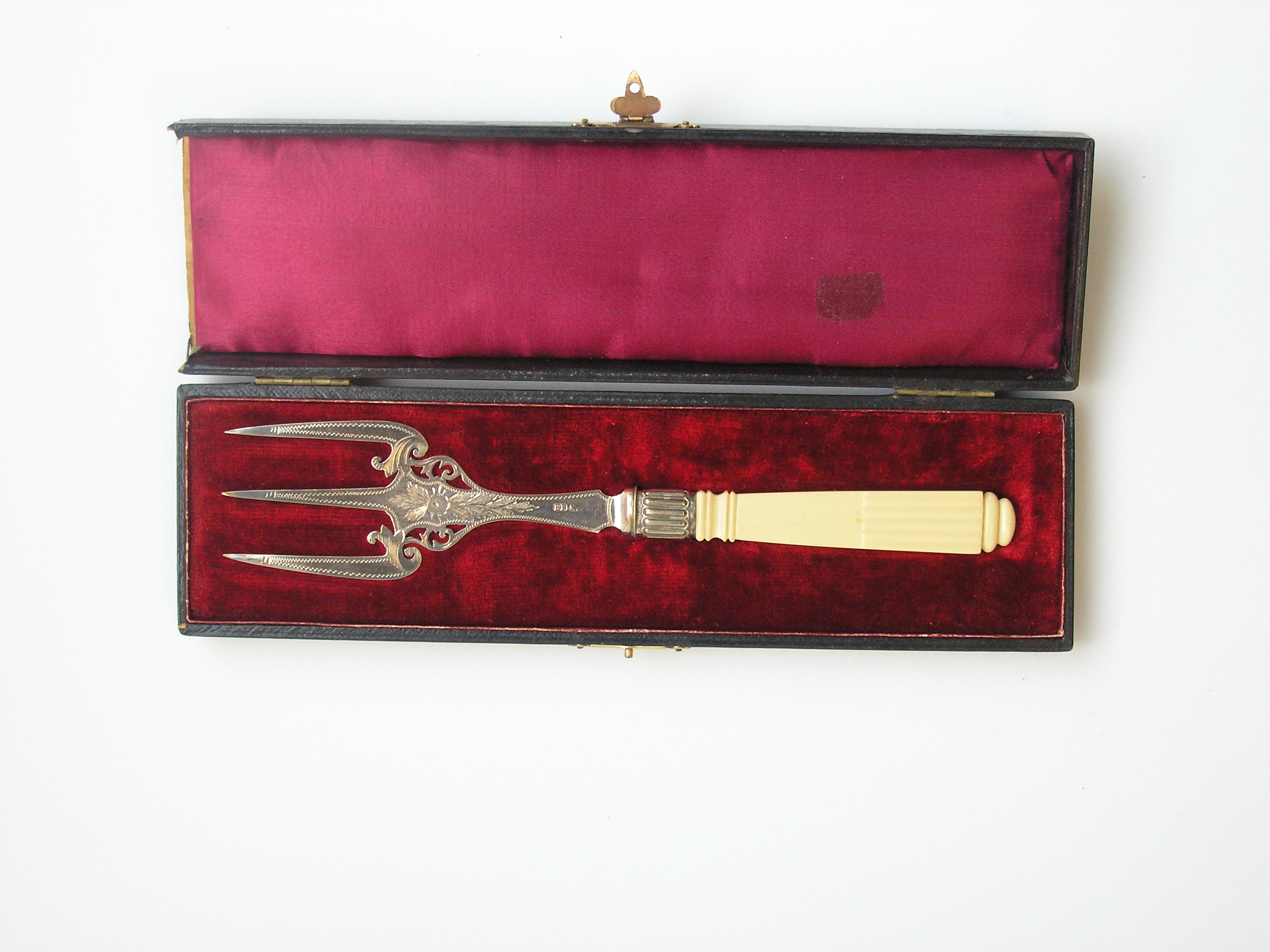
Bread fork

The bread fork was one of the highly specialized table serving utensils of the Victorian era. This three-tined piece of silverware was shaped like a trident with a great variety of handles, some being very elaborate. The sole purpose of the utensil was to carry a slice of bread or a bread roll from the service plate to the personal bread and butter plate. Serving food with fingers was a taboo at the time, with few exceptions, like eating a bread roll. It was considered impolite to take a piece of bread from the bread basket or pass it without the use of bread fork.

The fork, with its long (up to three-inch) tines, was invented in England and had some practical use there due to the tradition of serving a whole loaf to the table and cutting it as needed. The person in charge of cutting had to pass the slices somehow, and the fork was a safer replacement for a knife. In the US bread was usually served pre-sliced, making the fork unnecessary.

The forks were marketed separately or in a set with the bread knife. The utensil proved to be little-used and was only popular for a very short time at the end of the 19th century (an 1893 fashion review considered it a novelty). As a result, there is a large variety of bread forks in excellent condition available in the antique stores. Due to their fancy shapes, these forks are frequently repurposed for serving meat.

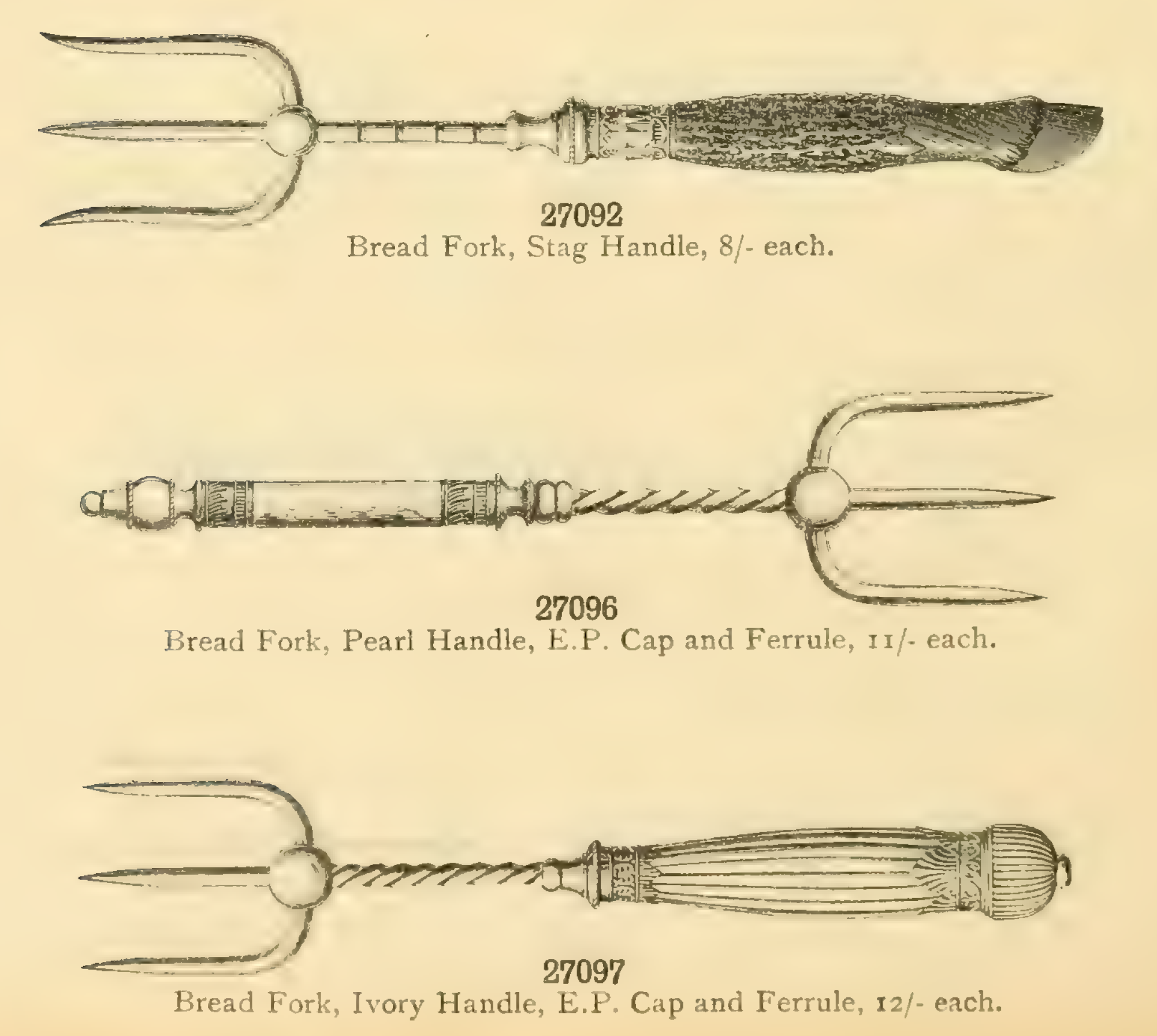

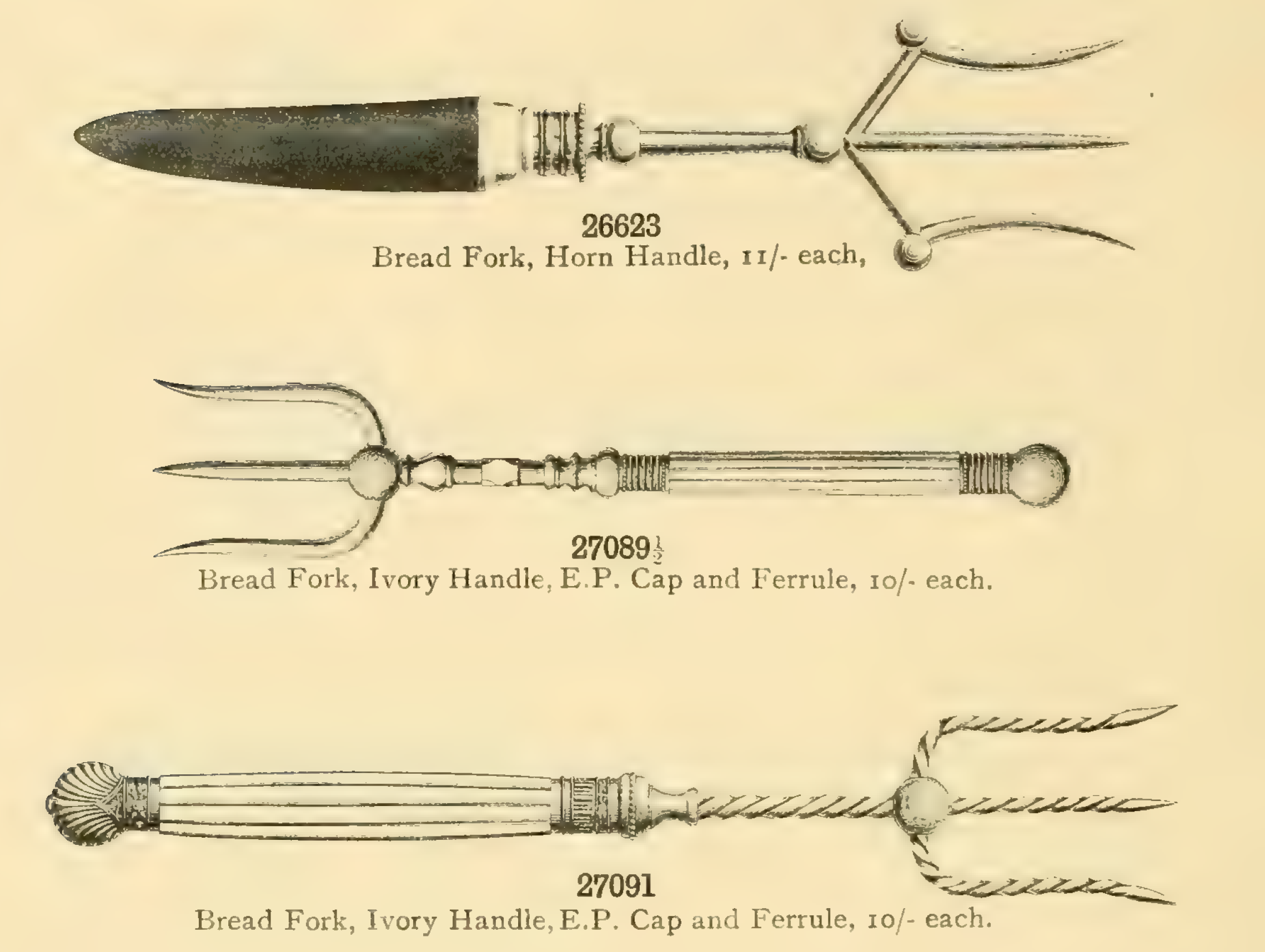

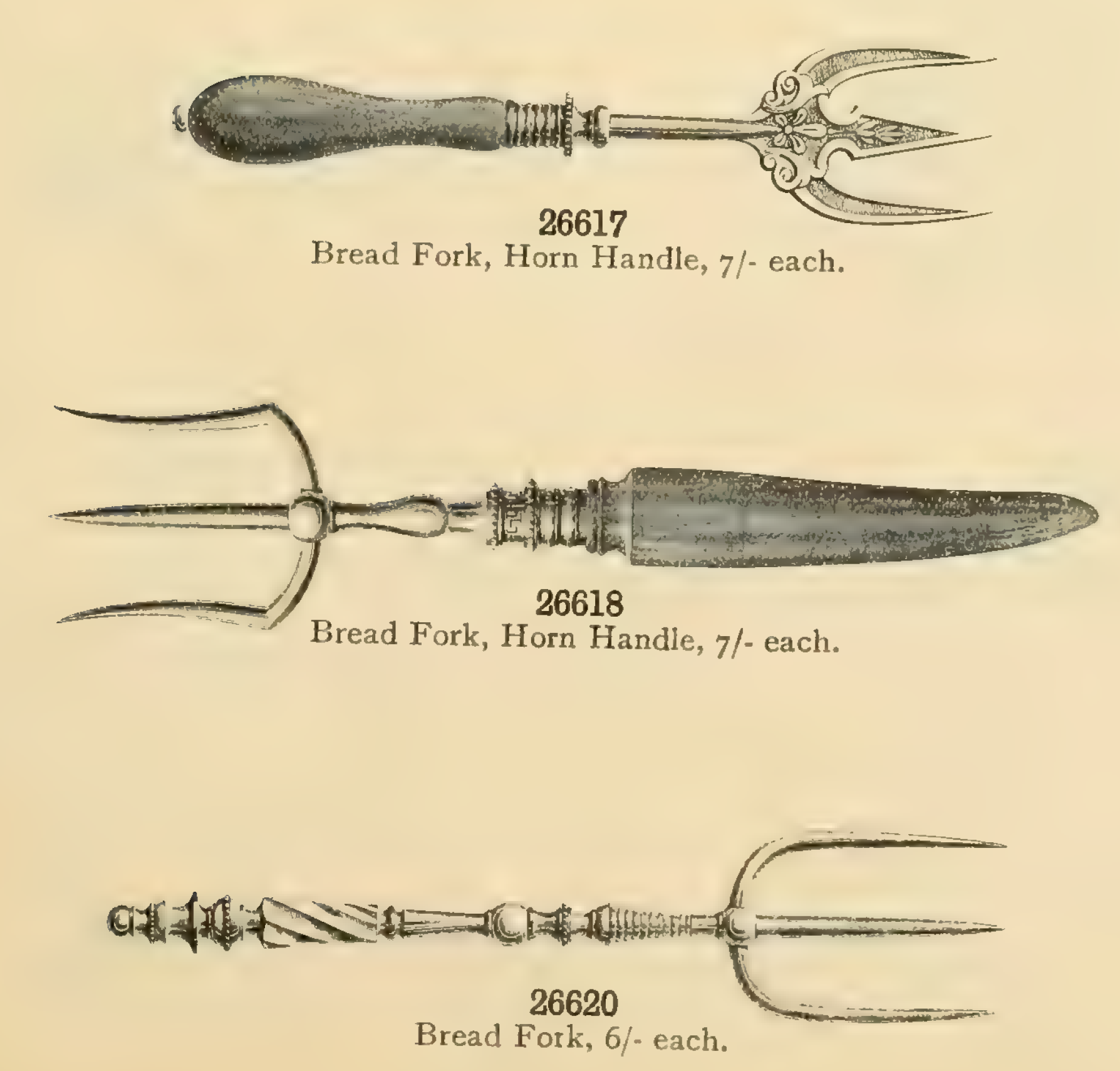

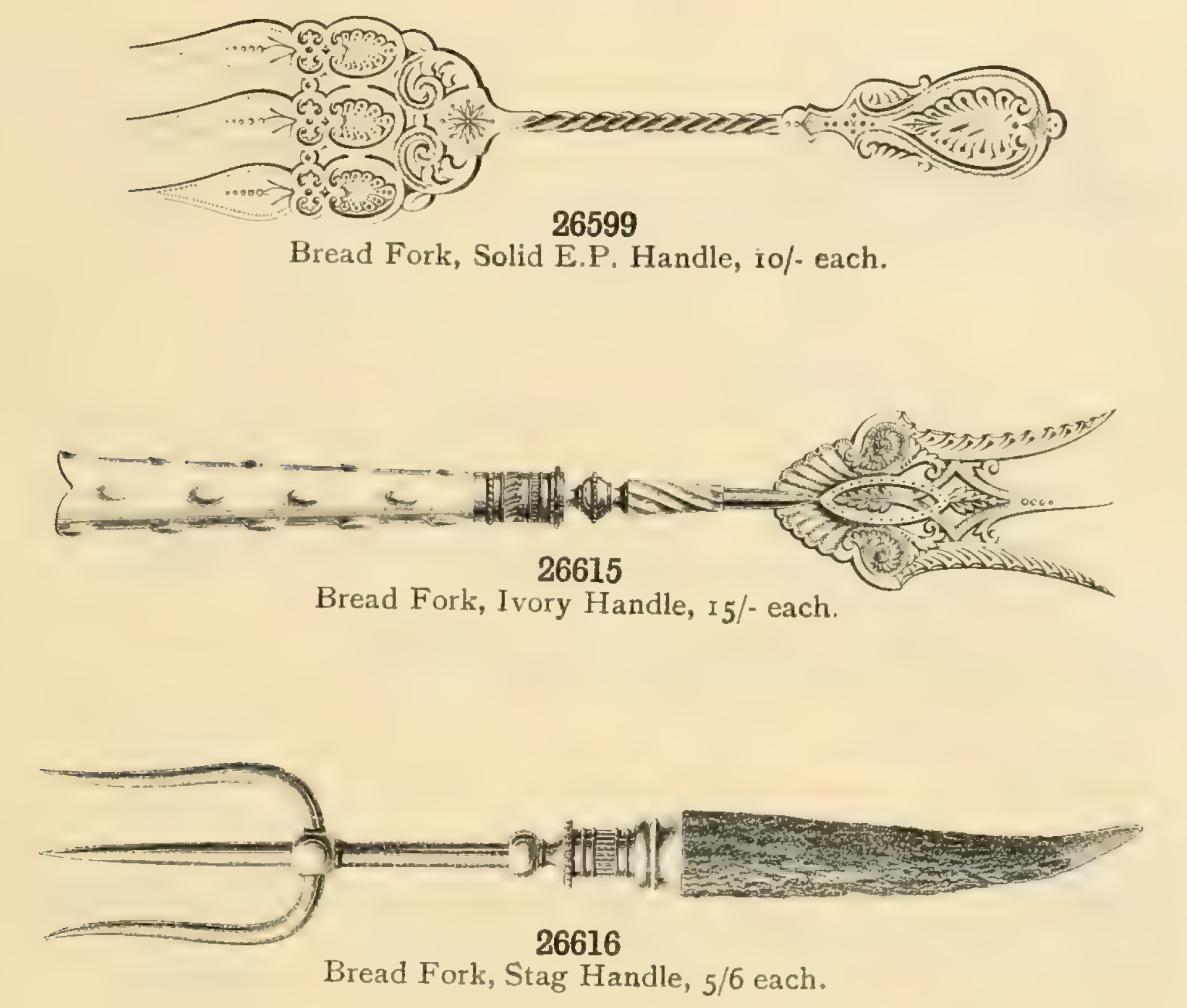

== Sources ==
- "Latest fashions in silverware". Current Opinion. Current Literature Publishing Company. 1893. pp. 552–555.
- Fox, Killian (2017-09-05). "Bread fork". The Gannet's Gastronomic Miscellany. Octopus Books. p. 13. ISBN 978-1-78472-433-7.
- Victoria and Albert Museum (June 1, 2001). "Bread fork". Victoria and Albert Museum.
- Wolfman, Peri; Gold, Charles (1994). Forks, Knives & Spoons. Clarkson Potter. ISBN 978-0-517-58828-4.
