= Butter dish =

Tableware for holding butter

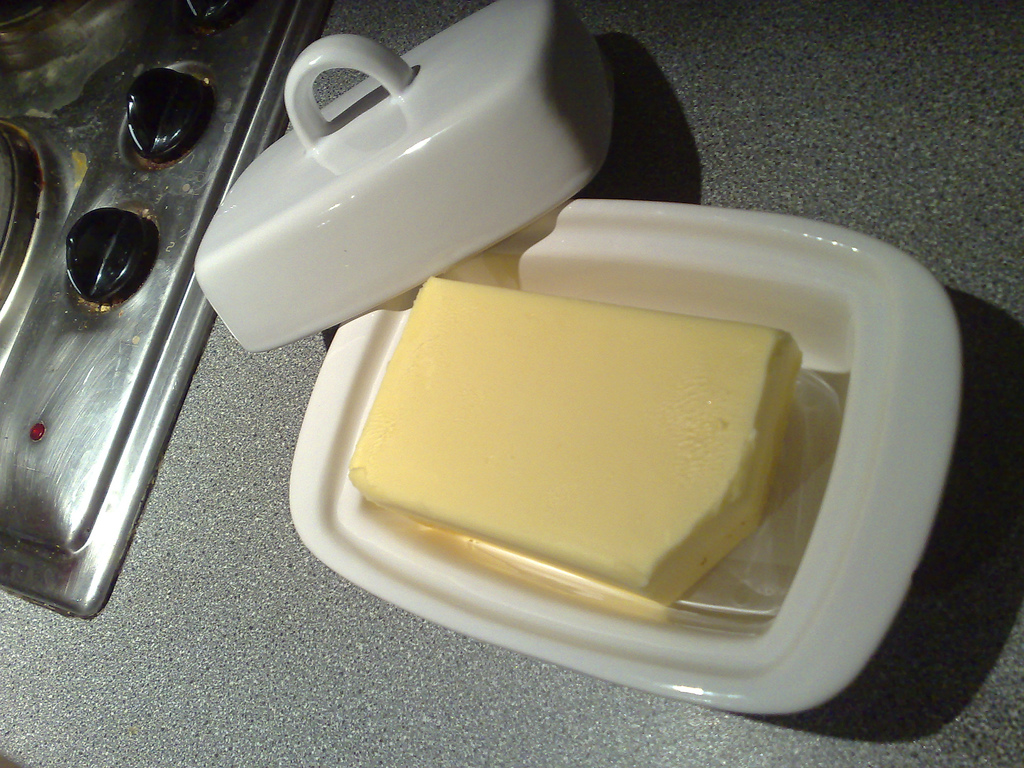
A ceramic butter dish.

A butter dish is defined as "a usually round or rectangular dish often with a drainer and a cover for holding butter at table". Before refrigerators existed, a covered dish made of crystal, silver, or china housed the butter. These butter dishes were made to hold the traditional round shape of butter at the time and came with an "ice chamber" to keep the butter cold. Another type of butter dish, a French butter dish, keeps butter fresh by using water to keep the butter away from the air, thereby keeping it fresh. The water is placed into the base of the dish and the butter is put into a bell-shaped lid, creating an air seal.

== See also ==
- Bread-and-butter plate, and individual plate for butter and bread

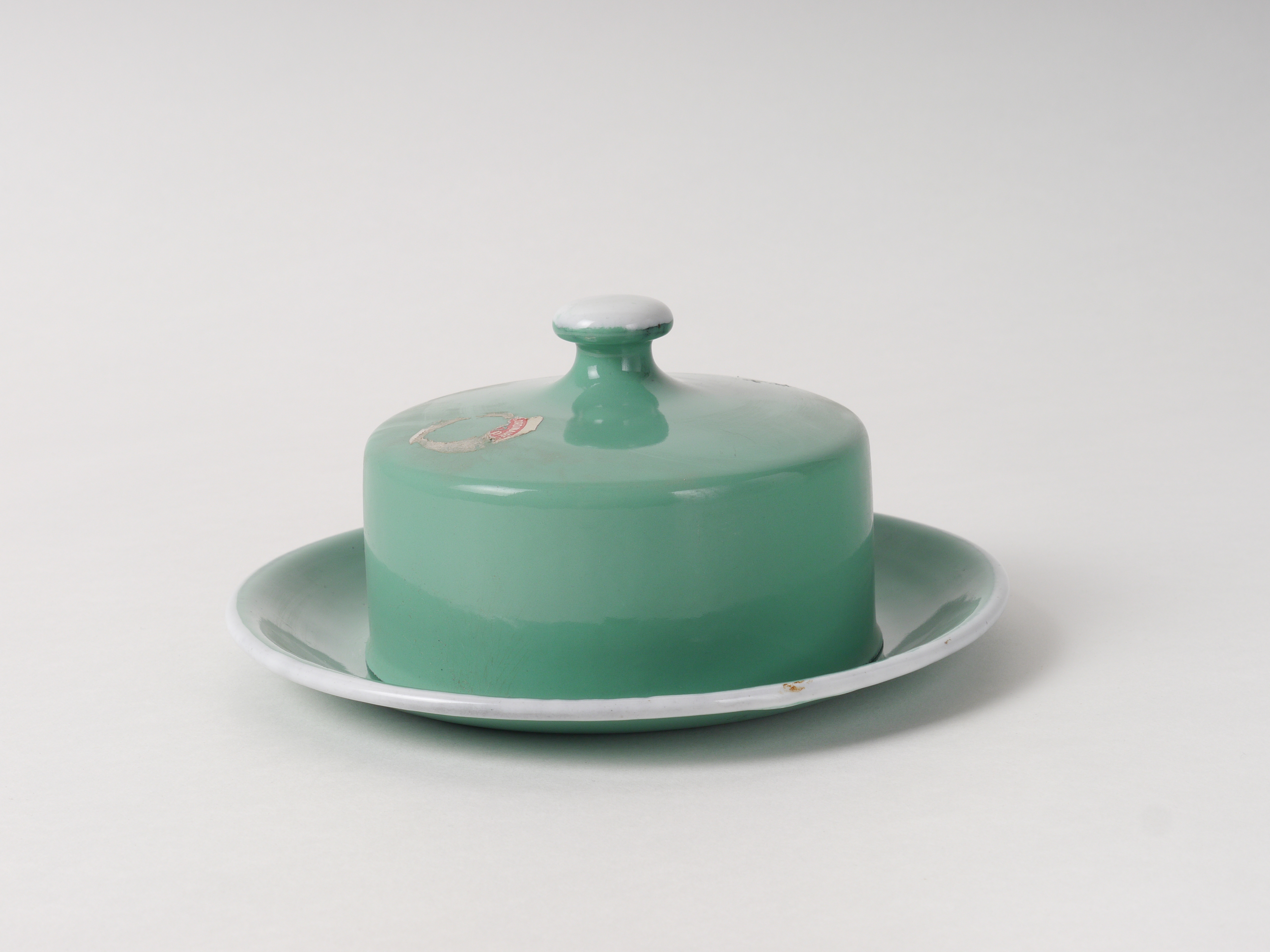
Enamelled butter dish | Collection Museum of Industry Ghent
