= French butter dish =

Container for freshness of butter

A French butter dish, is a cylindrical container used to maintain the freshness and spreadable consistency of butter without refrigeration. Butter is kept in what appears to be the lid, inverted, and submerged in water held in the base.

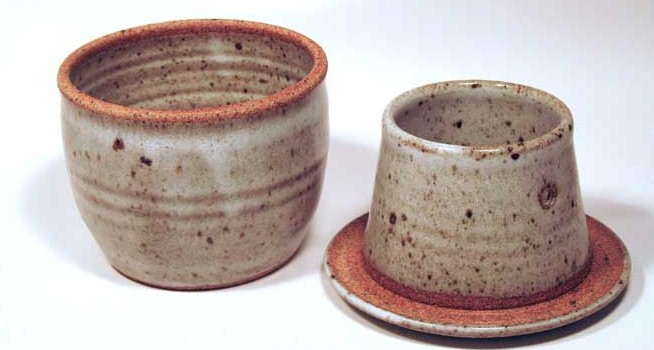
Photograph of an open French Butter Dish, lid and base. The lid on the right is filled with butter, then inverted and placed in the water-containing base on the left. This French butter dish made on potters wheel.

This late 19th-century French-designed pottery crock has two parts: a base that holds water, and a cup to hold the packed butter which also serves as a lid. The cup containing butter is placed into the base, where water creates an airtight seal that keeps the air (and thus oxygen) away from the butter so that refrigeration is not needed, and the butter can be used in its soft form. This method will keep butter for around a month provided it is kept at temperatures below 80 °F (27 °C) and the water is changed regularly. Other names for this item are: "French butter keeper", "French butter crock", "Butter Crock", "Beurrier à l'eau", "Beurrier Breton", "Beurrier Normand", "Cloche de beurre", "Pot à beurre Breton" (French), "Butterdose" (German). Two manufactured versions are the Norpro Butter Keeper and the Butter Bell.

== History ==
In the 1970s and 1980s, craft potters began producing and marketing the French butter dish throughout the United States at craft fairs and in art boutiques. "French butter dish" became the preferred name in the US around that time, and was later adopted by potters in Europe. By the end of the 20th century, French butter dishes became popular enough for manufactured versions to appear.
