= Trencher (tableware) =

Type of tableware used in medieval cuisine

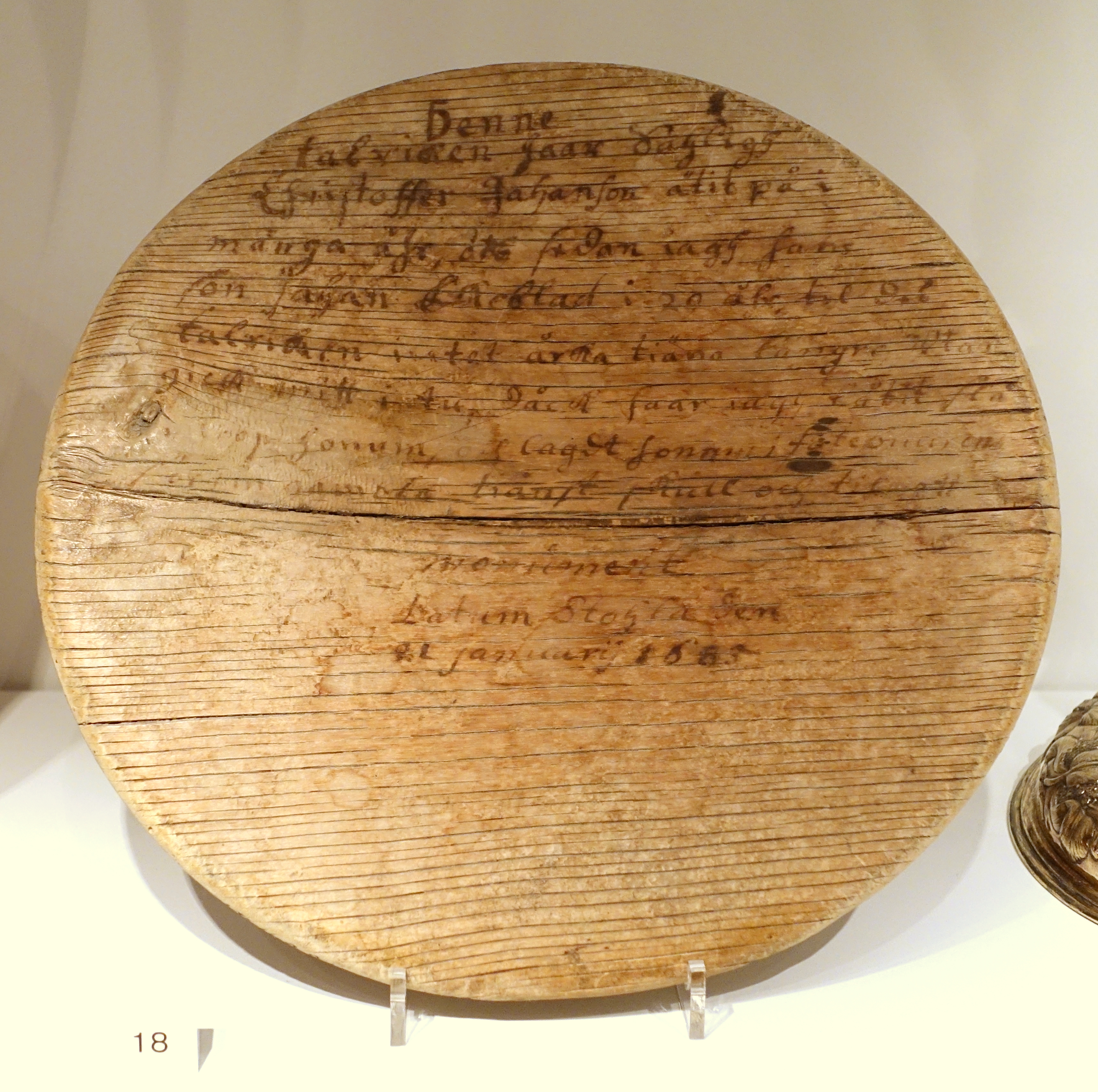
Wooden trencher from Västergötland, Sweden, mid-17th century

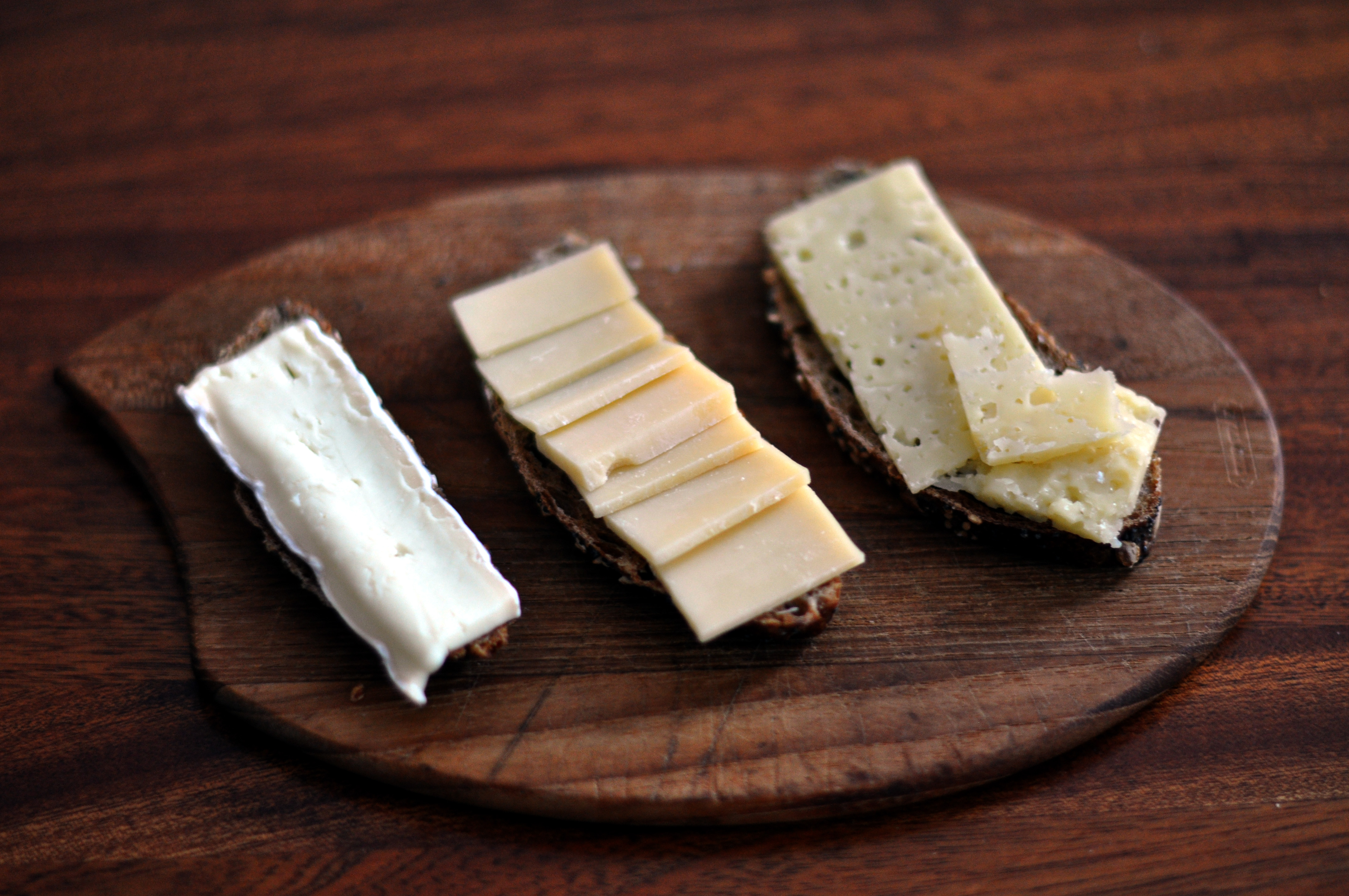
A modern cheeseboard

A trencher (from Old French trancher 'to cut') is a type of tableware, commonly used in medieval cuisine. A trencher was originally a flat round of (usually stale) bread used as a plate, upon which the food could be placed to eat. At the end of the meal, the trencher could be eaten with sauce, or could be given as alms to the poor. Later the trencher evolved into a small plate of metal or wood, typically circular and completely flat, without the lip or raised edge of a plate. Trenchers of this type are still used, typically for serving food that does not involve liquid; for example, the cheeseboard.

== In language ==
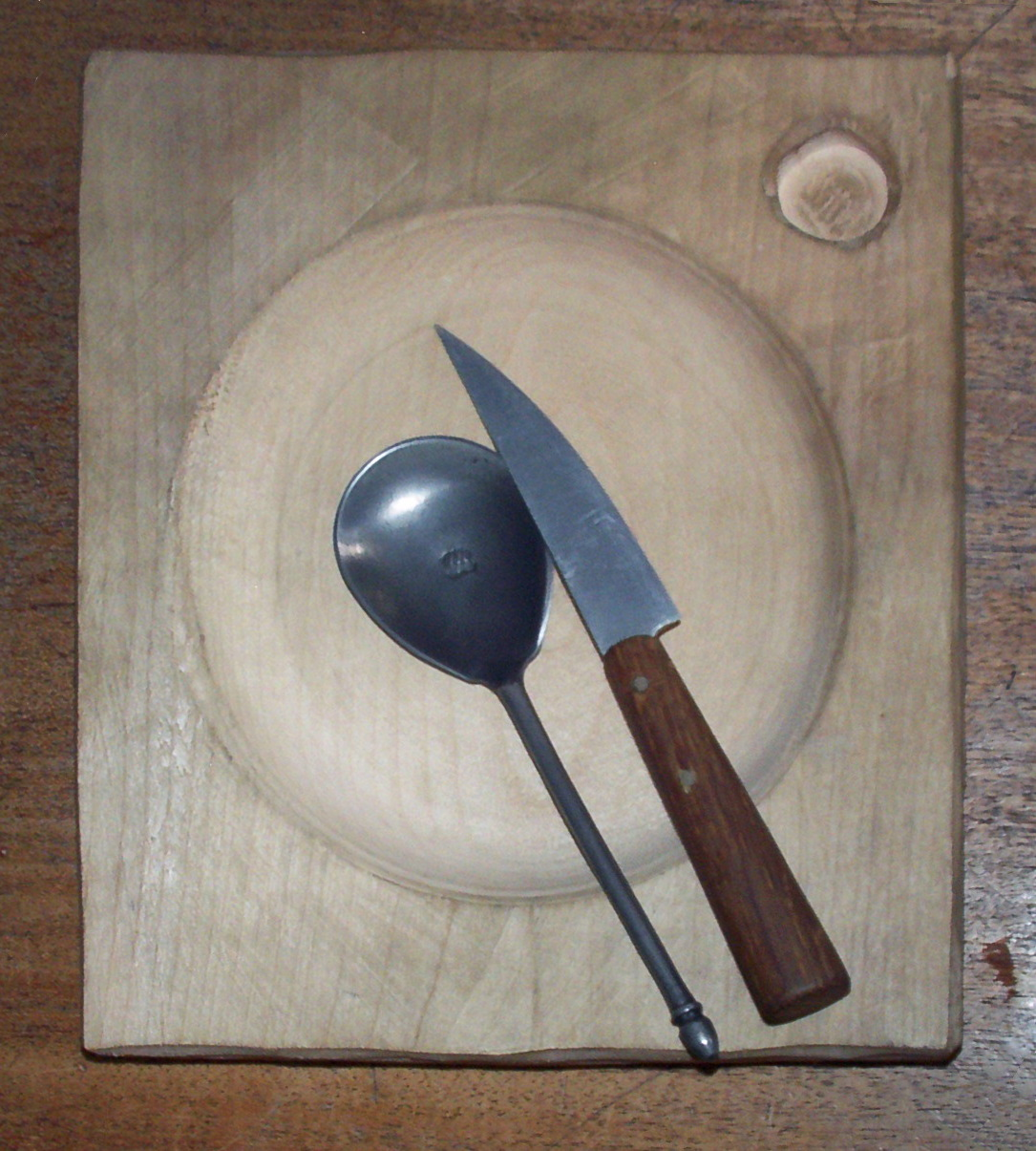
Trencher table setting

An individual salt dish or squat open salt cellar placed near a trencher was called a "trencher salt".

A "trencherman" is a person devoted to eating and drinking, often to excess; one with a hearty appetite, a gourmand. A secondary use, generally archaic, is one who frequents another's table, in essence a pilferer of another's food.

A "trencher-fed pack" is a pack of foxhounds or harriers in which the hounds are kept individually by hunt members and only assembled as a pack to hunt. Usually, a pack of hounds are maintained together as a pack in kennels.

== Literature ==
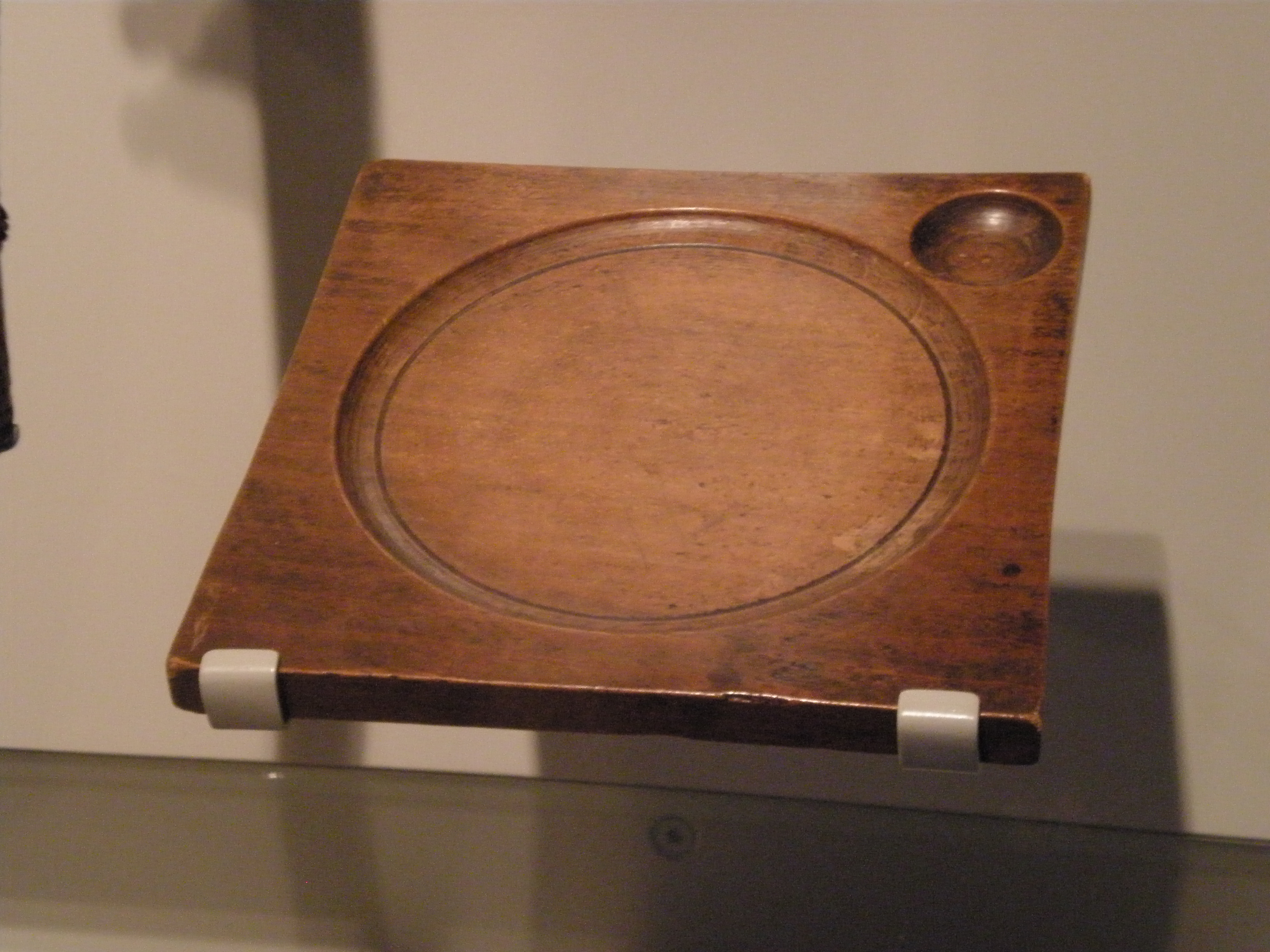
Wooden trencher

The Middle Ages, Everyday Life in Medieval Europe by Jeffrey L. Singman (Sterling publishers) offers the following observation: "The place setting also included a trencher, a round slice of bread from the bottom or the top of an old loaf, having a hard crust and serving as a plate. After the meal, the sauce-soaked trenchers were probably distributed to servants or the poor. Food was served on platters, commonly one platter to two diners, from which they transferred it to their trenchers."

Shakespeare used the term at least eleven times in his plays.

The term appears frequently throughout George R.R. Martin's A Song of Ice and Fire series, such as this excerpt from A Dance with Dragons: "The beer was brown, the bread black, the stew a creamy white. She served it in a trencher hollowed out of a stale loaf."

== See also ==
- Bread bowl
- Injera
- Edible tableware
- Frumenty
- Great hall
- Medieval cuisine
- Sop
