= Marquina =

Marquina may refer to:

- Marquina (surname)
- Villaviciosa de Marquina, another name for the Spanish town Markina-Xemein
- Marquina non-drip oil bottle, transparent and conical cruet designed to contain oil or vinegar
- Nero Marquina marble, high quality, black bituminous limestone from Markina, Spain
