= Tableware =

Items used for setting a table and serving food

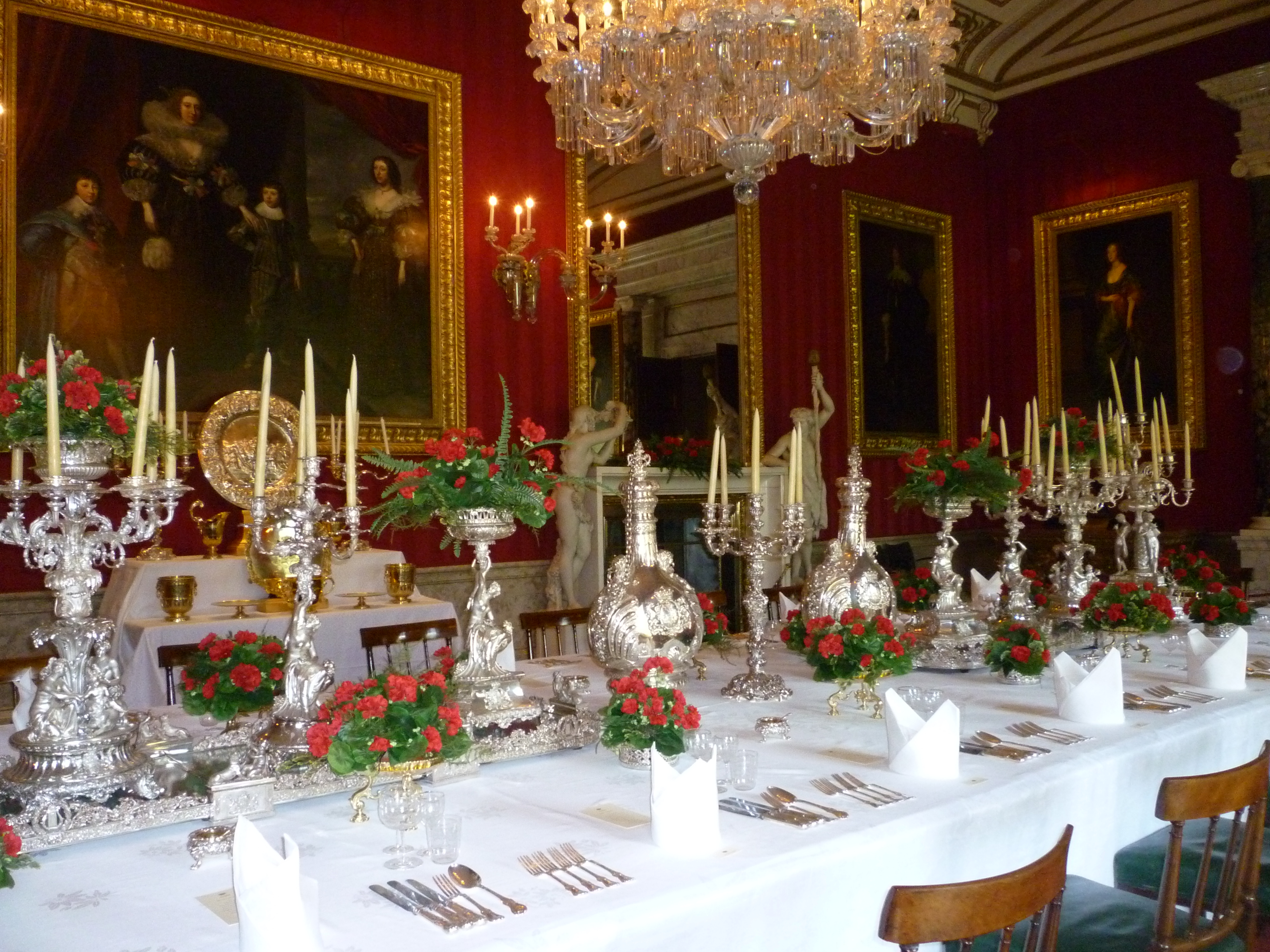
Formal dining table laid for a large private dinner party at Chatsworth House

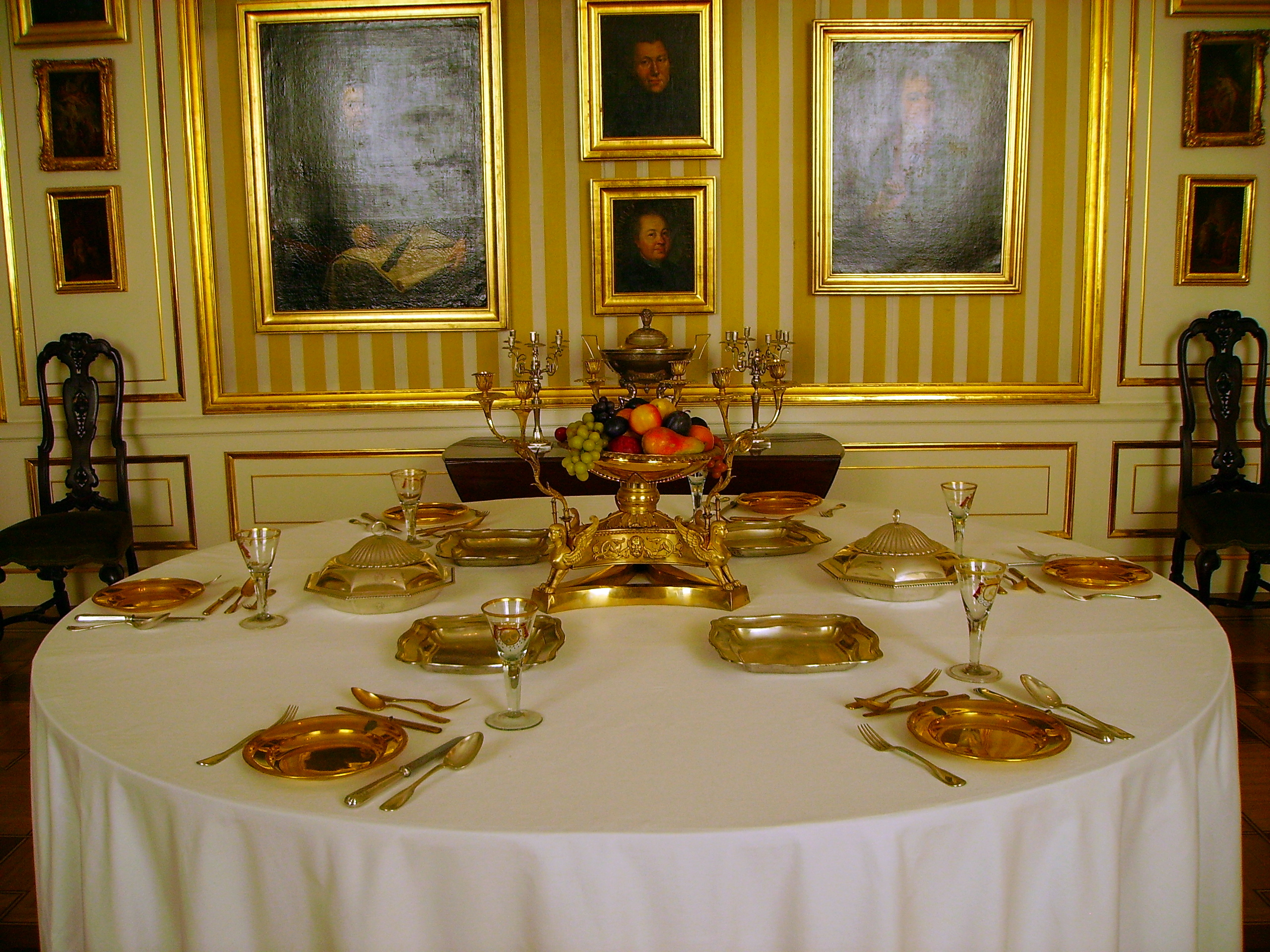
Table laid for six at the Royal Castle, Warsaw, (18th–19th century fashion)

Tableware items are the dishware and utensils used for setting a table, serving food, and dining. The term includes cutlery, glassware, serving dishes, serving utensils, and other items used for practical as well as decorative purposes. The quality, nature, variety and number of objects varies according to culture, religion, number of diners, cuisine and occasion. For example, Middle Eastern, Indian or Polynesian food culture and cuisine sometimes limits tableware to serving dishes, using bread or leaves as individual plates, and not infrequently without use of cutlery. Special occasions are usually reflected in higher quality tableware.

Cutlery is more usually known as silverware or flatware in the United States, where cutlery usually means knives and related cutting instruments; elsewhere cutlery includes all the forks, spoons and other silverware items. Outside the US, flatware is a term for "open-shaped" dishware items such as plates, dishes and bowls (as opposed to "closed" shapes like jugs and vases). Dinnerware is another term used to refer to tableware, and crockery refers to ceramic tableware, today often porcelain or bone china. Sets of dishes are referred to as a table service, dinner service or service set. Table settings or place settings are the dishes, cutlery and glassware used for formal and informal dining. In Ireland, tableware is often referred to as delph, the word being an English language phonetic spelling of the word Delft, the town from which so much delftware came. Silver service or butler service are methods for a butler or waiter to serve a meal.

Setting the table refers to arranging the tableware, including individual place settings for each diner at the table as well as decorating the table itself in a manner suitable for the occasion. Tableware and table decoration are typically more elaborate for special occasions. Unusual dining locations demand tableware be adapted.

== Materials ==
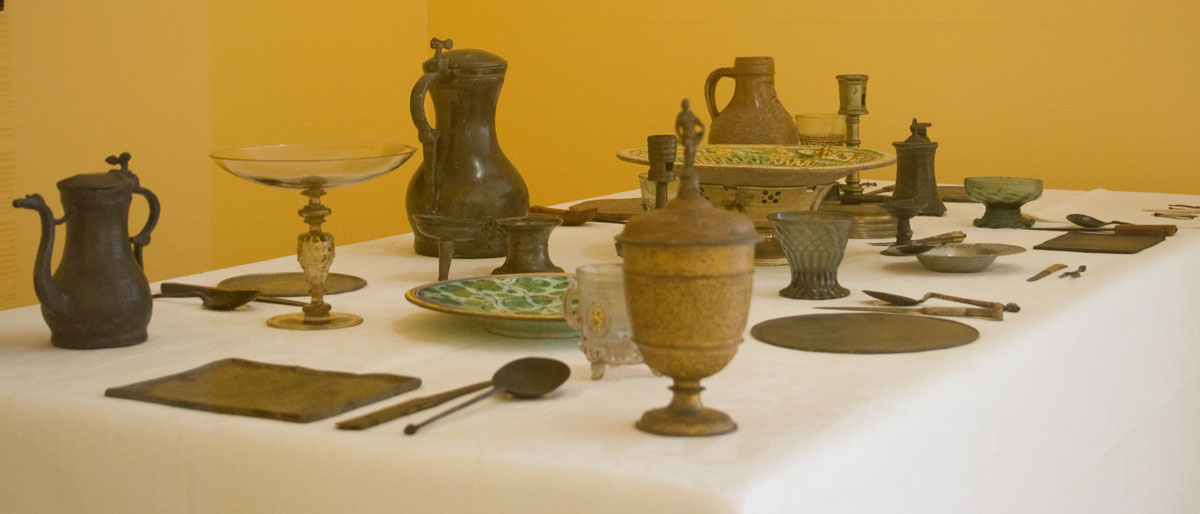
Historic pewter, faience and glass tableware

In recent centuries, flatware is commonly made of ceramic materials such as earthenware, stoneware, bone china or porcelain. The popularity of ceramics is at least partially due to the use of glazes as these ensure the ware is impermeable, reduce the adherence of pollutants and ease washing. In 2020, the global market for ceramic tableware was estimated to be worth $US2.22 billion, with the top five exporting countries being China ($US834 million), Portugal ($US215 million), Germany ($US113 million), Thailand ($US110 million) and United Kingdom ($US106 million).

Banana leaves are used in some South Asian and Southeast Asian cultures.

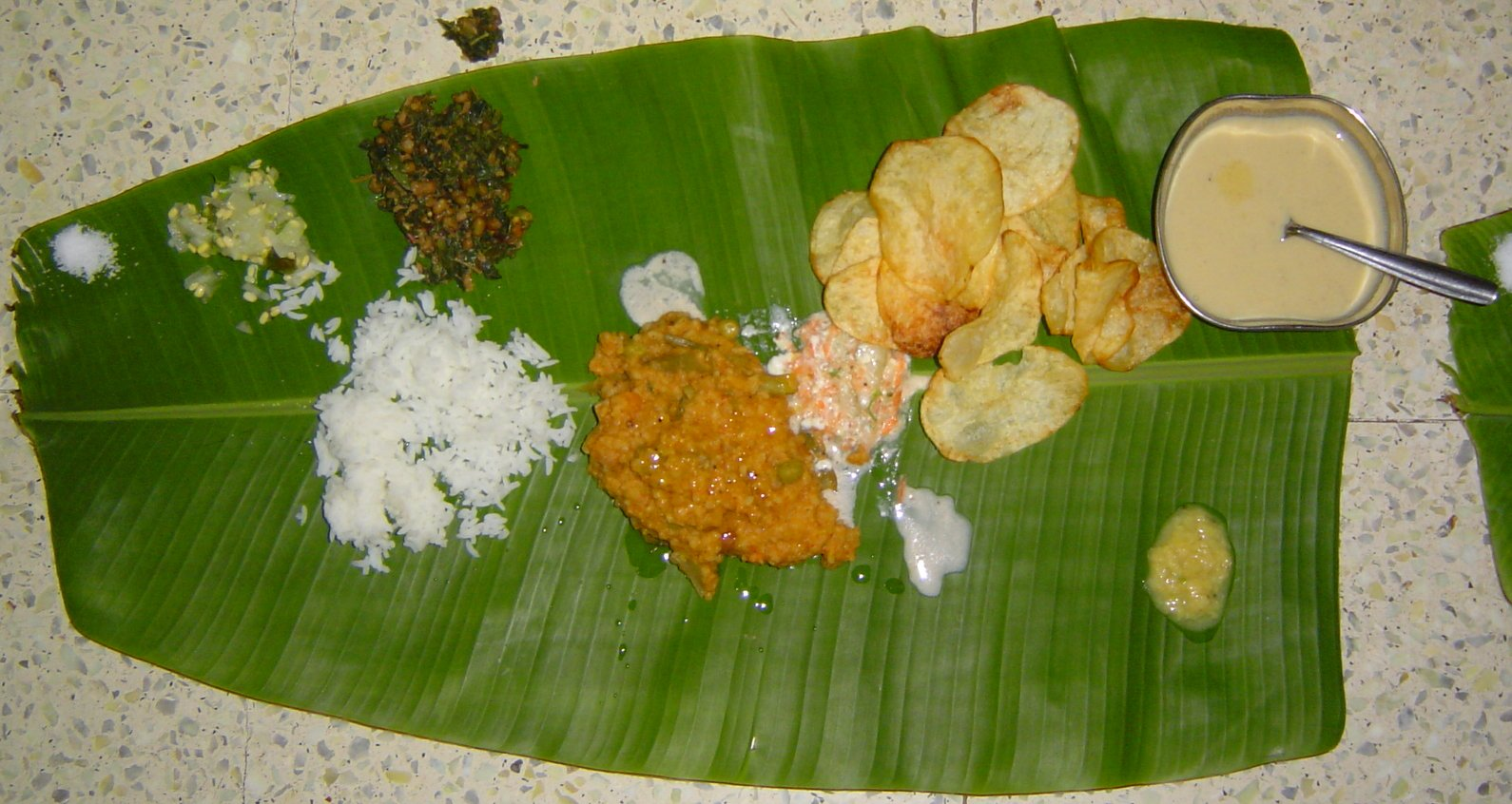
Food served on a banana leaf in Karnataka, India

Tableware can also made of other materials, such as wood (including lacquer), metals (such as pewter), tempered glass, or plastics (such as acrylics, melamine or polypropylene). Before mass-produced tableware, it was fashioned from available materials, such as wood. Industrialisation and developments in ceramic manufacture made inexpensive tableware available. It is sold either by the piece or as a matched set for a number of diners, normally four, six, eight or twelve place settings.

Cutlery is normally made of metal, especially stainless steel, though large pieces such as ladles for serving may be of wood. The use of porcelain for spoons is popular in some Asian countries. Chopsticks are made of wood, bamboo, metal, ivory and plastic.

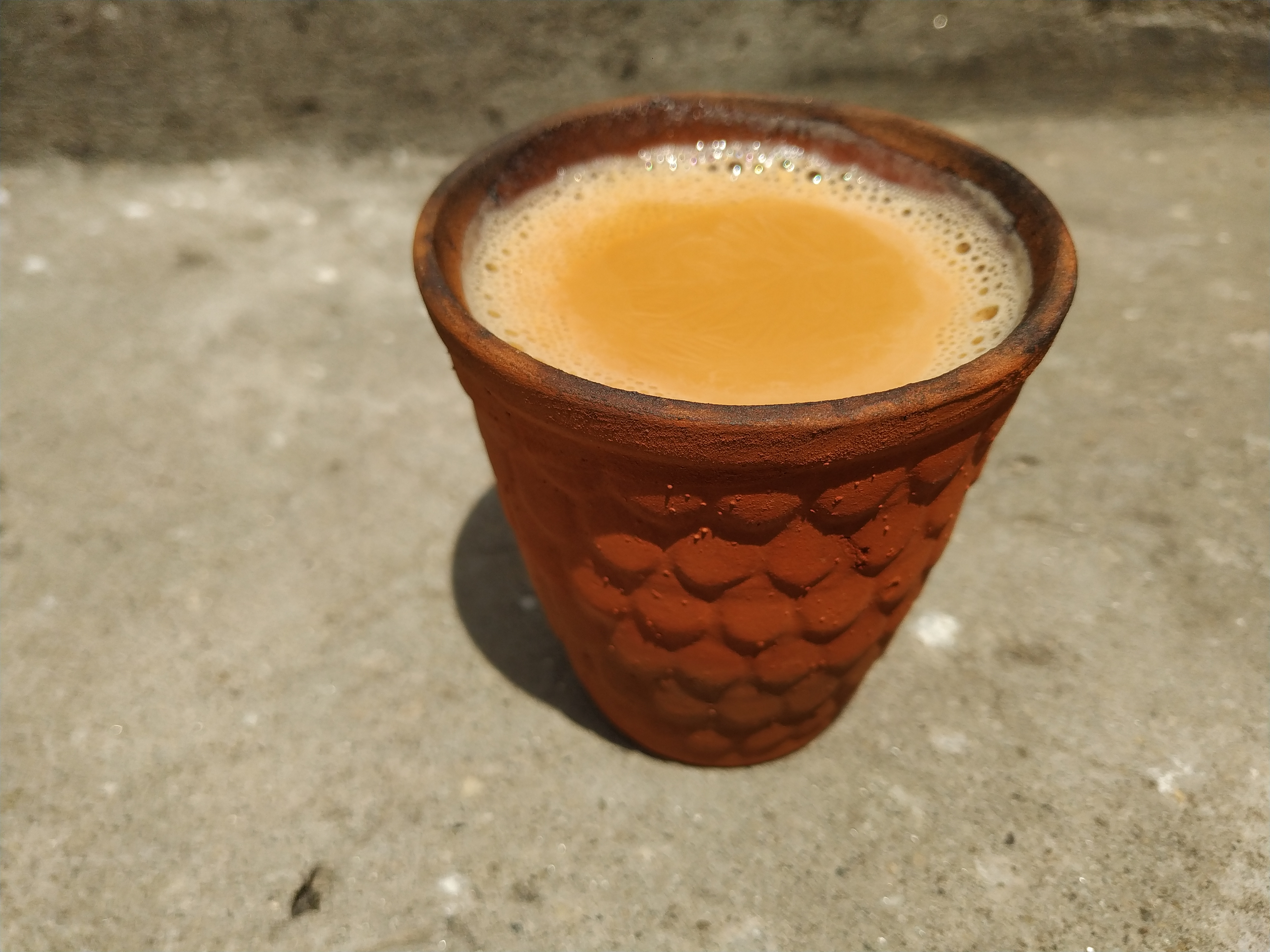
Tea served in a kulhar

Disposable tableware includes all disposable (single-use) tableware. These are often made from paper, plastic, wood or bagasse. Due to environment concerns, single-use plastic plates and cutlery will be banned in England from October 2023. A similar ban has been place in the EU since July 2021. Canada is also planning such legislation. A kulhar is a traditional handle-less pottery cup from South Asia that is typically undecorated and unglazed, and is meant to be disposable.

== History ==
=== Plates and other vessels ===
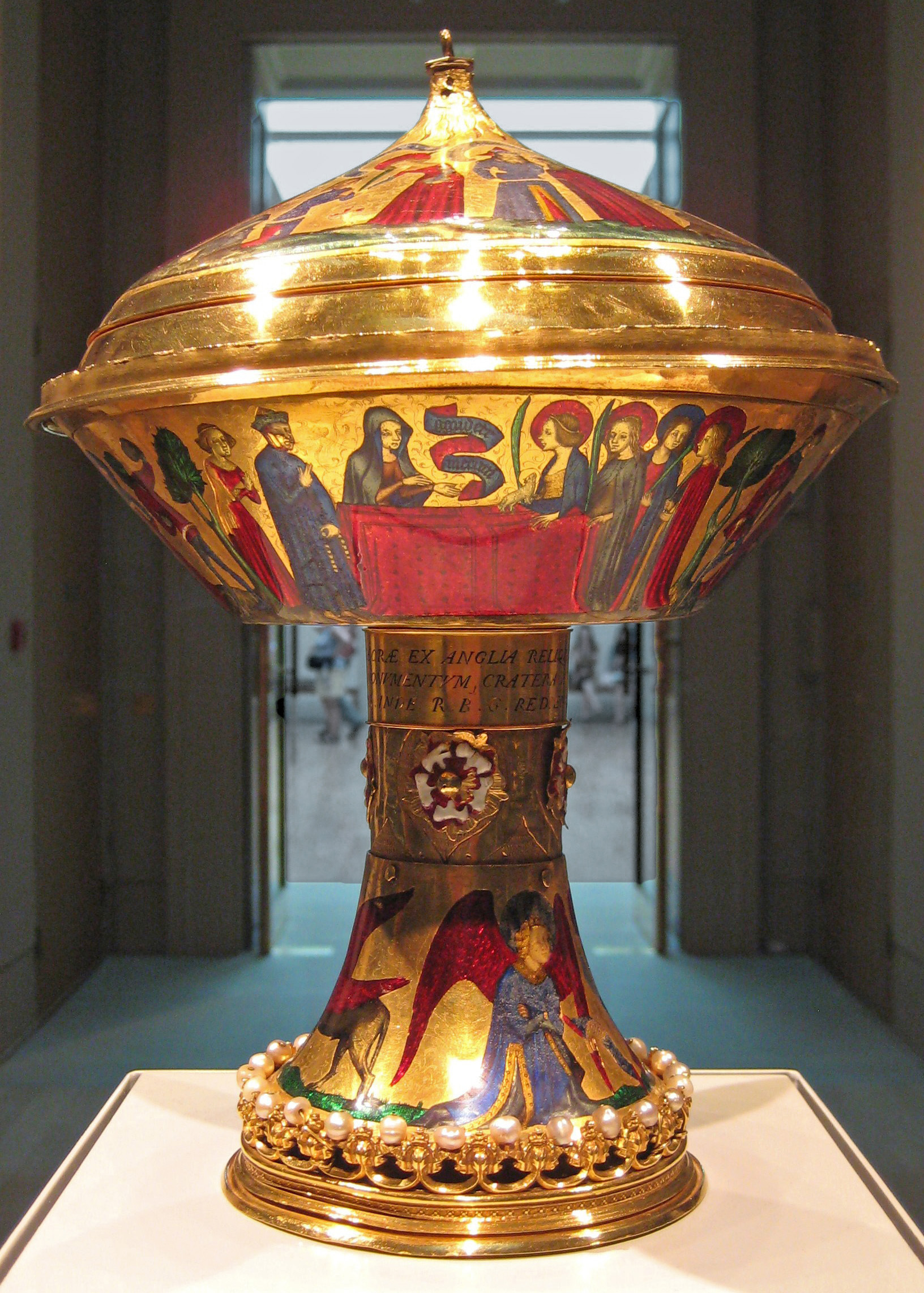
The Royal Gold Cup, 23.6 cm high, 17.8 cm across; weight 1.935 kg, British Museum. Saint Agnes appears to her friends in a vision. Before 1391, when it was owned by the King of France. One of a handful of medieval survivals, solid gold with enamels.

The earliest pottery in cultures around the world does not seem to have included flatware, concentrating on pots and jars for storage and cooking. Wood does not survive well in most places, and though archaeology has found few wooden plates and dishes from prehistory, they may have been common, once the tools to fashion them were available.

Ancient elites in most cultures preferred flatware in precious metals ("plate") at the table; China and Japan were two major exceptions, using lacquerware and later fine pottery, especially porcelain. In China, bowls have always been preferred to plates. In Europe, pewter was often used by the less-well-off (and eventually, the poor), and silver or gold was preferred by wealthier individuals. Religious considerations influenced the choice of materials, as well: Muhammad spoke against using gold at table, as the contemporary elites of Persia and the Byzantine Empire did, and this greatly encouraged the growth of Islamic pottery.

In Europe, the elites dined off metal, usually silver for the rich and pewter for the middling classes, from the ancient Greeks and Romans until the 18th century.

A trencher (from Old French tranchier 'to cut') was commonly used in medieval cuisine. A trencher was originally a flat round of (usually stale) bread used as a plate, upon which the food could be placed to eat. At the end of the meal, the trencher could be eaten with sauce, but could also be given as alms to the poor. Similar use of bread is still found with the bread bowl.

The trencher was not fully replaced in France until the 1650s, although in Italy maiolica was used from the 15th century. Orders survive for large services. At an Este family wedding feast in Ferrara in 1565, 12,000 plates painted with the Este arms were used, though the "top table" probably ate off precious metal.

Possession of tableware has to a large extent been determined by individual wealth; the greater the means, the higher was the quality of tableware that was owned and the more numerous its pieces. The materials used were often controlled by sumptuary laws. In the late Middle Ages and for much of the Early Modern period much of a great person's disposable assets were often in "plate", vessels and tableware in precious metal, and what was not in use for a given meal was often displayed on a dressoir de parement or buffet (similar to a large Welsh dresser) against the wall in the dining hall. At the wedding of Philip the Good, Duke of Burgundy, and Isabella of Portugal in 1429, there was a dresser 20 feet long on either side of the room, each with five rows of plate; A comparable display on three dressoirs could be seen at the State Banquet in Buckingham Palace for the US President, Donald Trump in 2019. Inventories of King Charles V of France (r. 1364–1380) record that he had 2,500 pieces of plate.

Plate was often melted down to finance wars or building, or until the 19th century just for remaking in a more fashionable style, and hardly any of the enormous quantities recorded in the later Middle Ages survives. The French Royal Gold Cup now in the British Museum, in solid gold and decorated with enamel and pearls, is one of few secular exceptions. Weighing more than two kilos, it was perhaps passed around for ceremonial toasts. Another is the much plainer English silver Lacock Cup, which has survived as it was bequeathed to a church early on, for use as a chalice.

The same is true for French silver from the 150 years before the French Revolution, when French styles, either originals or local copies, were used by all the courts of Europe. London silversmiths came a long way behind, but were the other main exporters. French silver now survives almost entirely in the form of exported pieces, like the Germain Service for the King of Portugal.

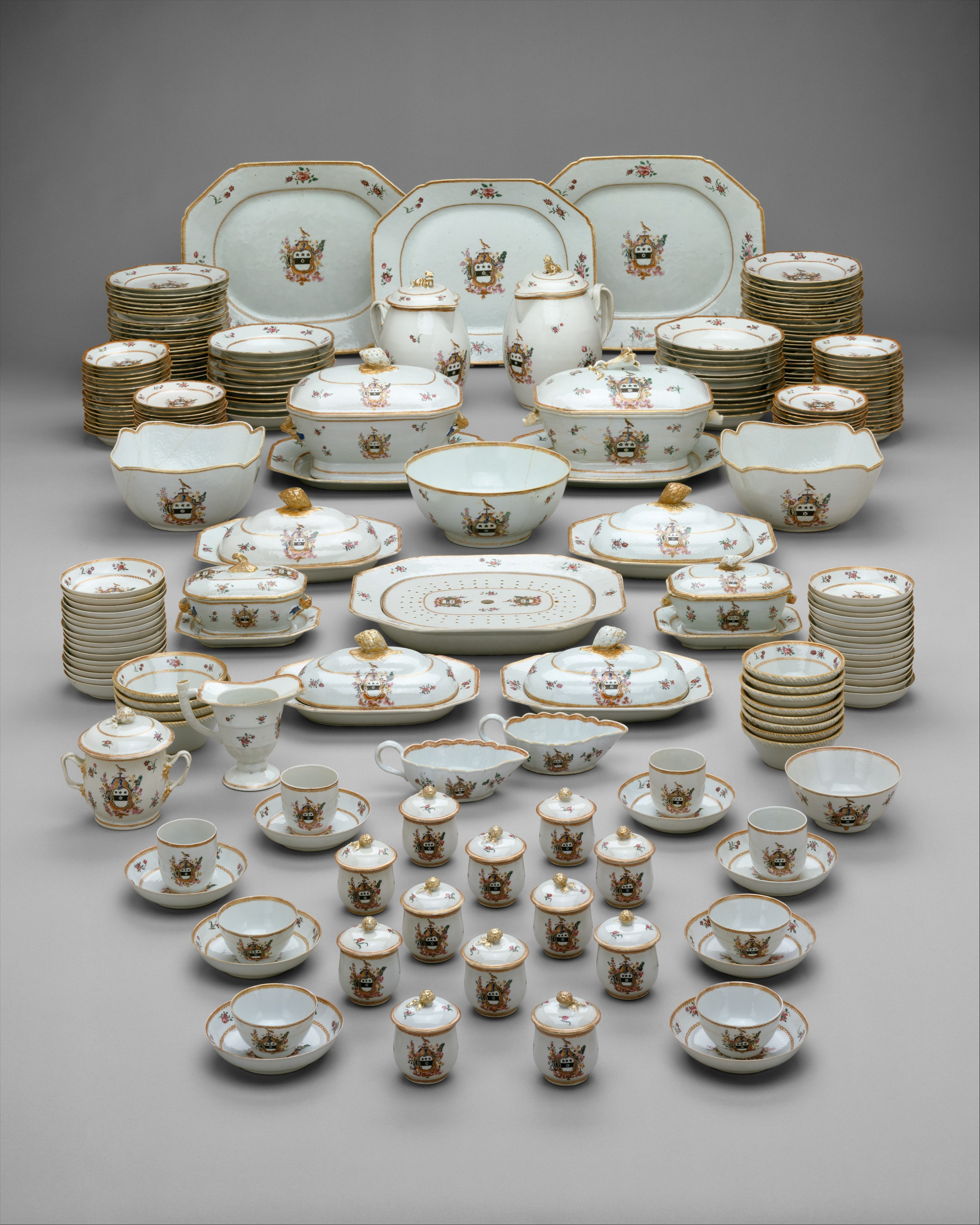
A c. 1785–90 Chinese export porcelain dinner service for the American market

In London in the 13th century, the more affluent citizens owned fine furniture and silver, "while those of straiter means possessed only the simplest pottery and kitchen utensils." By the later 16th century, "even the poorer citizens dined off pewter rather than wood" and had plate, jars and pots made from "green glazed earthenware". The nobility often used their arms on heraldic china.

The final replacement of silver tableware with porcelain as the norm in French aristocratic dining had taken place by the 1770s. After this the enormous development of European porcelain and cheaper fine earthenwares like faience and creamware, as well as the resumption of large imports of Chinese export porcelain, often armorial porcelain decorated to order, led to matching "china" services becoming affordable by an ever-wider public. By 1800 cheap versions of these were often brightly decorated with transfer printing in blue, and were beginning to be affordable by the better-off working-class household. Until the mid-19th century the American market was largely served by imports from Britain, with some from China and the European continent.

The introduction to Europe of hot drinks, mostly but not only tea and coffee, as a regular feature of eating and entertaining, led to a new class of tableware. In its most common material, various types of ceramics, this is often called teaware. It developed in the late 17th century, and for some time the serving pots, milk jugs and sugar bowls were often in silver, while the cups and saucers were ceramic, often in Chinese export porcelain or its Japanese equivalent. By the mid 18th century matching sets of European "china" were usual for all the vessels, although these often did not include plates for cake etc. until the next century. This move to local china was rather delayed by the tendency of some early types of European soft-paste porcelain to break if too hot liquid was poured into it.

=== Cutlery ===
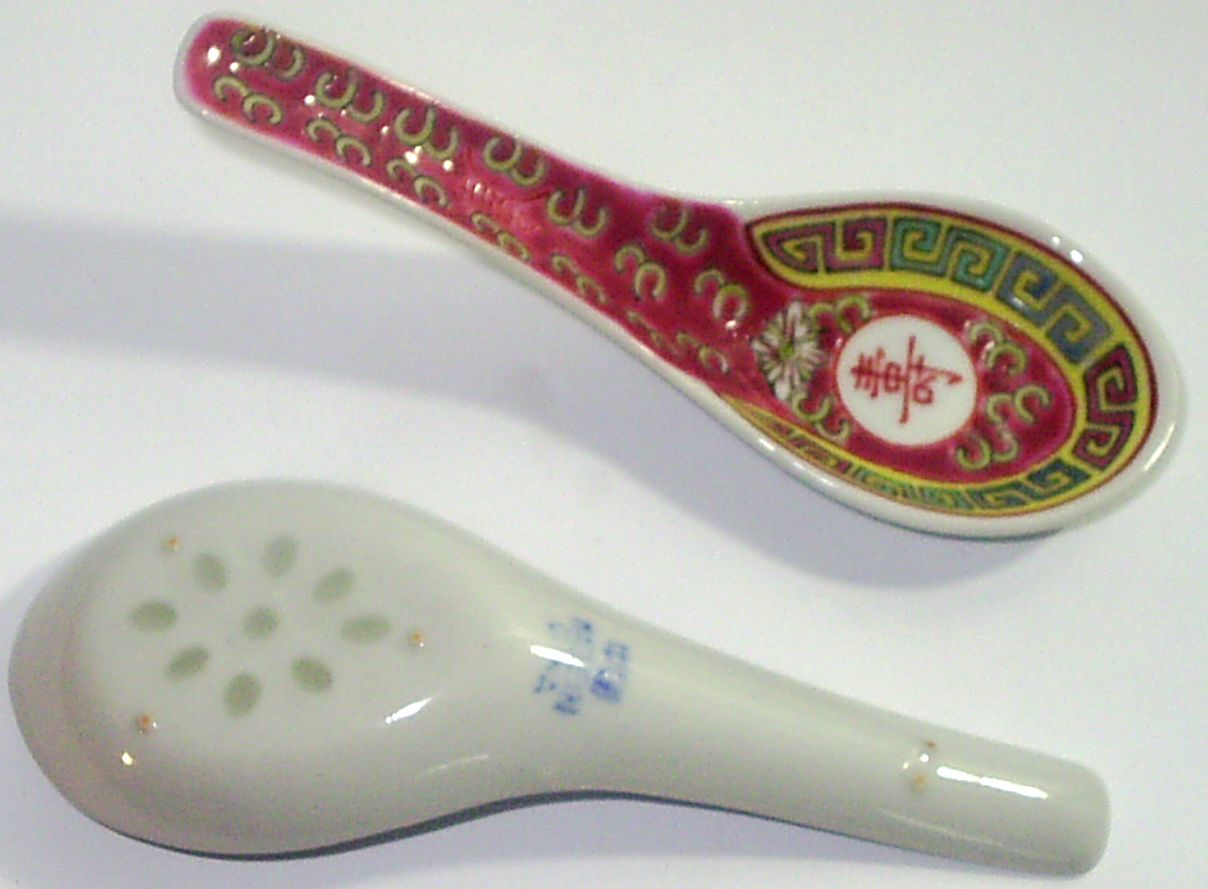
A pair of Chinese porcelain spoons

The knife is the oldest type of cutlery; early ones were normally carried by the individual at all times. Forks and spoons came later, and are initially only for the wealthy, who typically carried their own personal set. After the Romans, who made great use of spoons, joined by forks later, there were only knives and perhaps wooden spoons for most of the Middle Ages. It was only in the 17th century that hosts among the elite again began to lay out cutlery at the table, although at an Italian banquet in 1536 for Charles V, Holy Roman Emperor, it is recorded that each guest was provided with knife, spoon and fork, evidently a rarity. The table fork was revived in Italy in the 16th century, and was described for his English readers by Thomas Coryat in the 1590s as "not used in any other country that I saw in my travels". In England and France, it only became common after the 1660s, even in the court of Louis XIV, and for a while seems to have mostly been used by ladies, and for especially messy food, like fruits in syrup.

=== Chopsticks ===
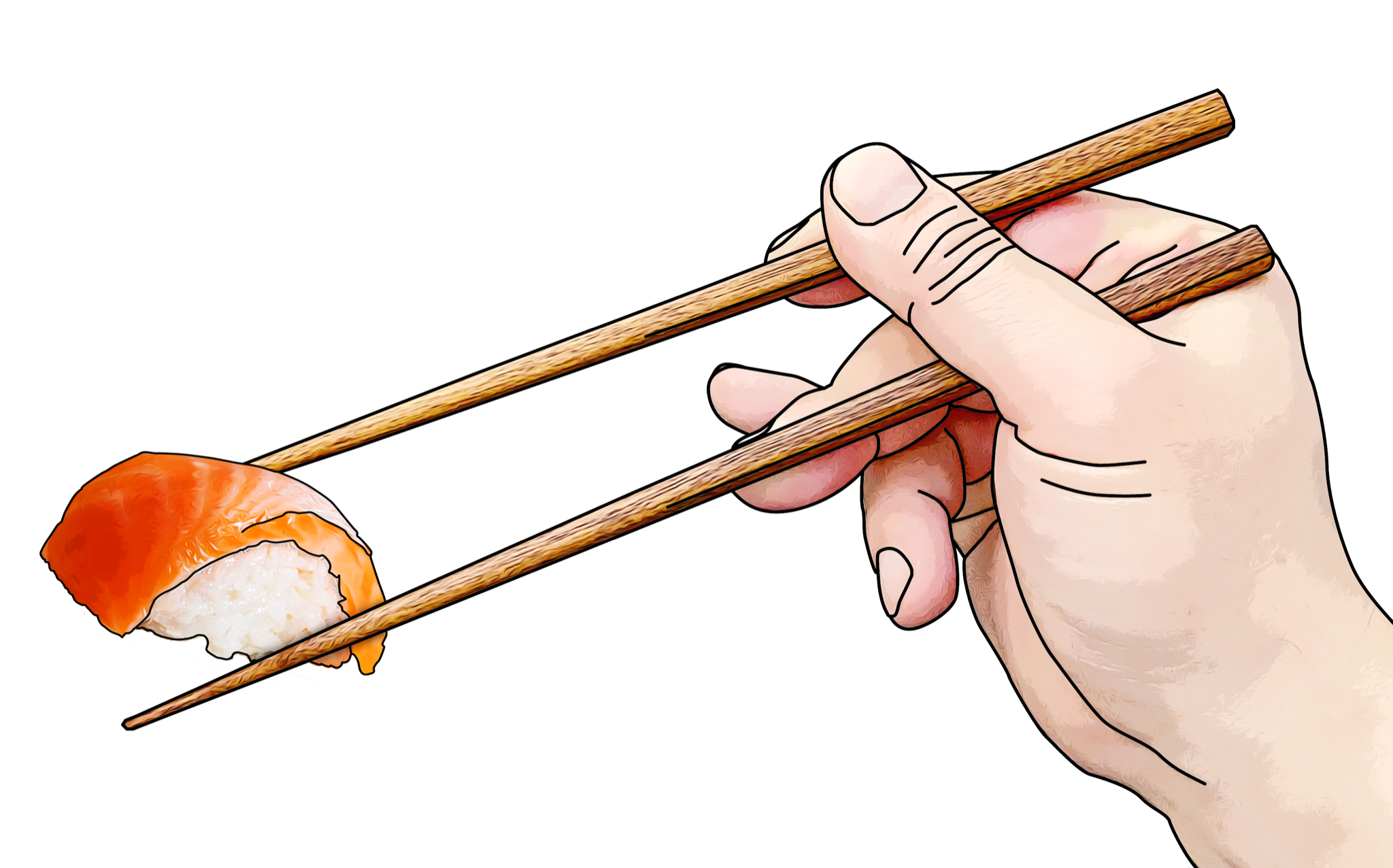
A pair of chopsticks holding a piece of sushi

Chopsticks (Chinese: 筷子 or 箸; Pinyin: kuàizi or zhù) are shaped pairs of equal-length sticks that have been used as both kitchen and eating utensils in much of East and Southeast Asia for over three millennia. Traditionally wood, especially bamboo, although other materials such as plastic or metal are also used. Usually, they have a square profile at the slightly thicker end held in the hand, but are round at the other end, that touches the food.

Chopsticks have been used since at least the Shang dynasty (1766–1122 BCE). However, the Han dynasty historian Sima Qian wrote that it is likely that chopsticks were also used in the preceding Xia dynasty and even the earlier Erlitou culture, although finding archeological evidence from this era is incredibly difficult.

Though originating in China, chopsticks later spread to Japan, Korea, Tibet, Vietnam and other parts of Asia. Chopsticks have become more accepted in connection with Asian food in the West, especially in cities with significant Asian diaspora communities.

=== Table decoration ===
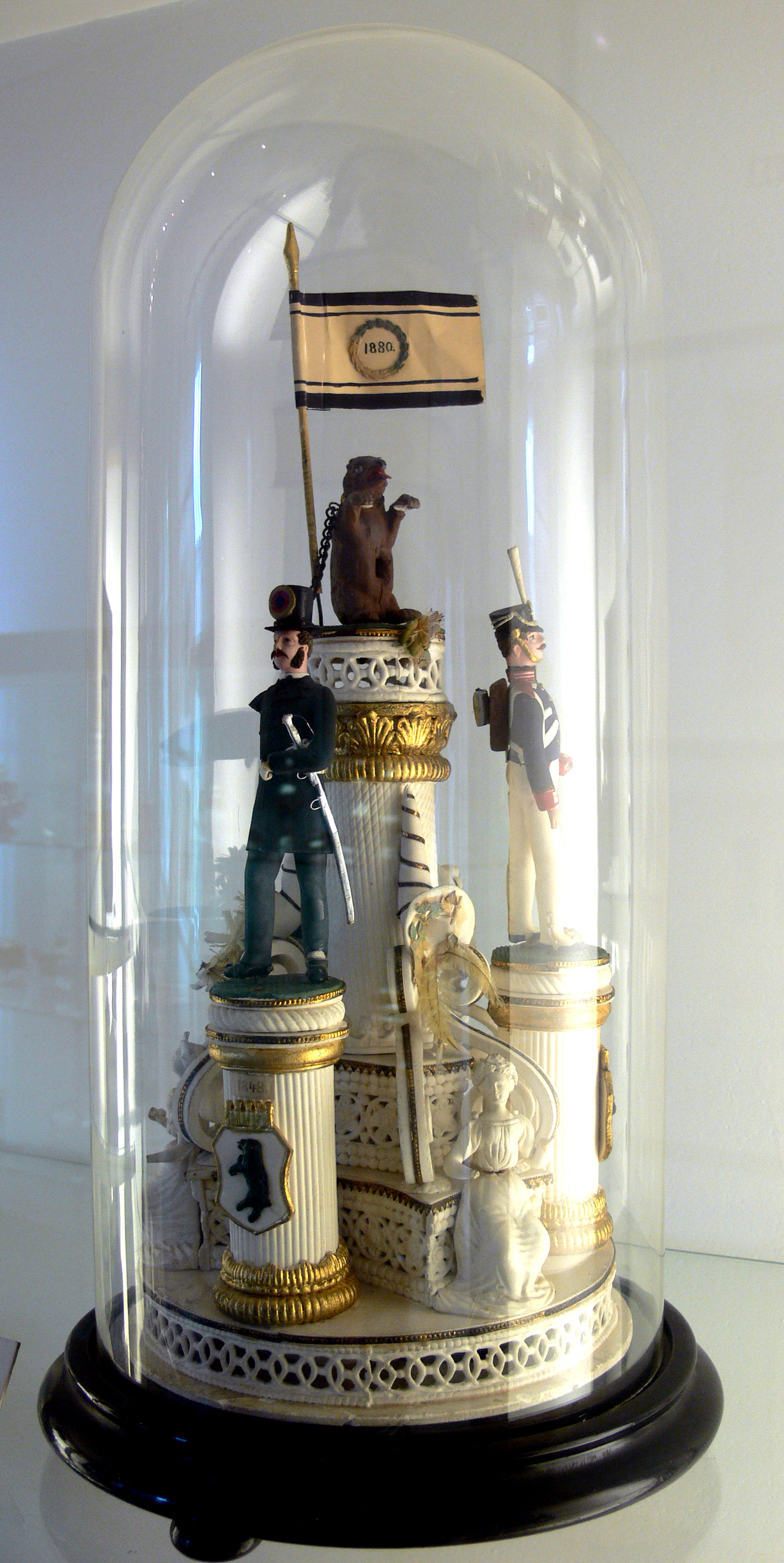
Sugar sculpture (1880)

Tableware is generally the functional part of the settings on dining tables but great attention has been paid to the purely decorative aspects, especially when dining is regarded as part of entertainment such as in banquets given by important people or special events, such as State occasions. Table decoration may be ephemeral and consist of items made from confectionery or wax; substances commonly employed in Roman banqueting tables of the 17th century. During the reign of George III of the United Kingdom, ephemeral table decoration was done by men known as "table-deckers" who used sand and similar substances to create marmotinto works (sand painting) for single-use decoration. In modern times, ephemeral table decorations continue to be made from sugar or carved from ice.

The porcelain figurine began in early 18th-century Germany as a permanent replacement for sugar sculptures on the dining table.

In wealthy countries, table decorations for the aristocracy were often made of precious metals such as silver-gilt. The model ship or nef was popular throughout the Renaissance. One of the most famous table decorations is the Cellini Salt Cellar. Ephemeral and silver table decorations were sometimes replaced with porcelain after it was made in Europe from the 18th century onwards.

== Western style ==
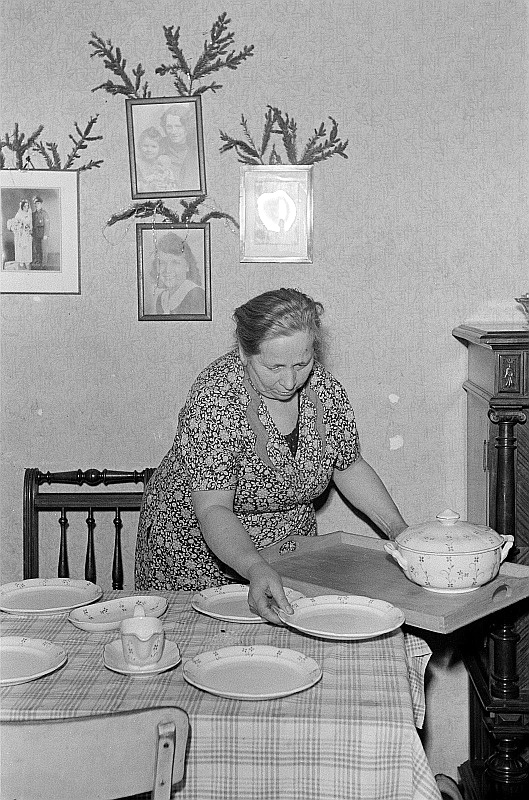
Setting the table for a family meal, Leipzig (1952)

=== Table settings ===
A table setting in Western countries is mainly in one of two styles: service à la russe (French for "in the Russian style"), where each course of the meal is brought out in specific order; and service à la française (French for "in the French style"), where all the courses for the meal are arranged on the table and presented at the same time that guests are seated. Service à la russe has become the custom in most restaurants, whereas service à la française is the norm in family settings.

Place settings for service à la russe dining are arranged according to the number of courses in the meal. The tableware is arranged in a particular order. With the first course, each guest at the table begins by using the tableware placed on the outside of place setting. As each course is finished the guest leaves the used cutlery on the used plate or bowl, which are removed from the table by the server. In some cases, the original set is kept for the next course. To begin the next course, the diner uses the next item on the outside of the place setting, and so on. Forks are placed on the left of a dinner plate, knives to the right of the plate, and spoons to the outer right side of the place setting.

=== Flatware, plates and bowls ===
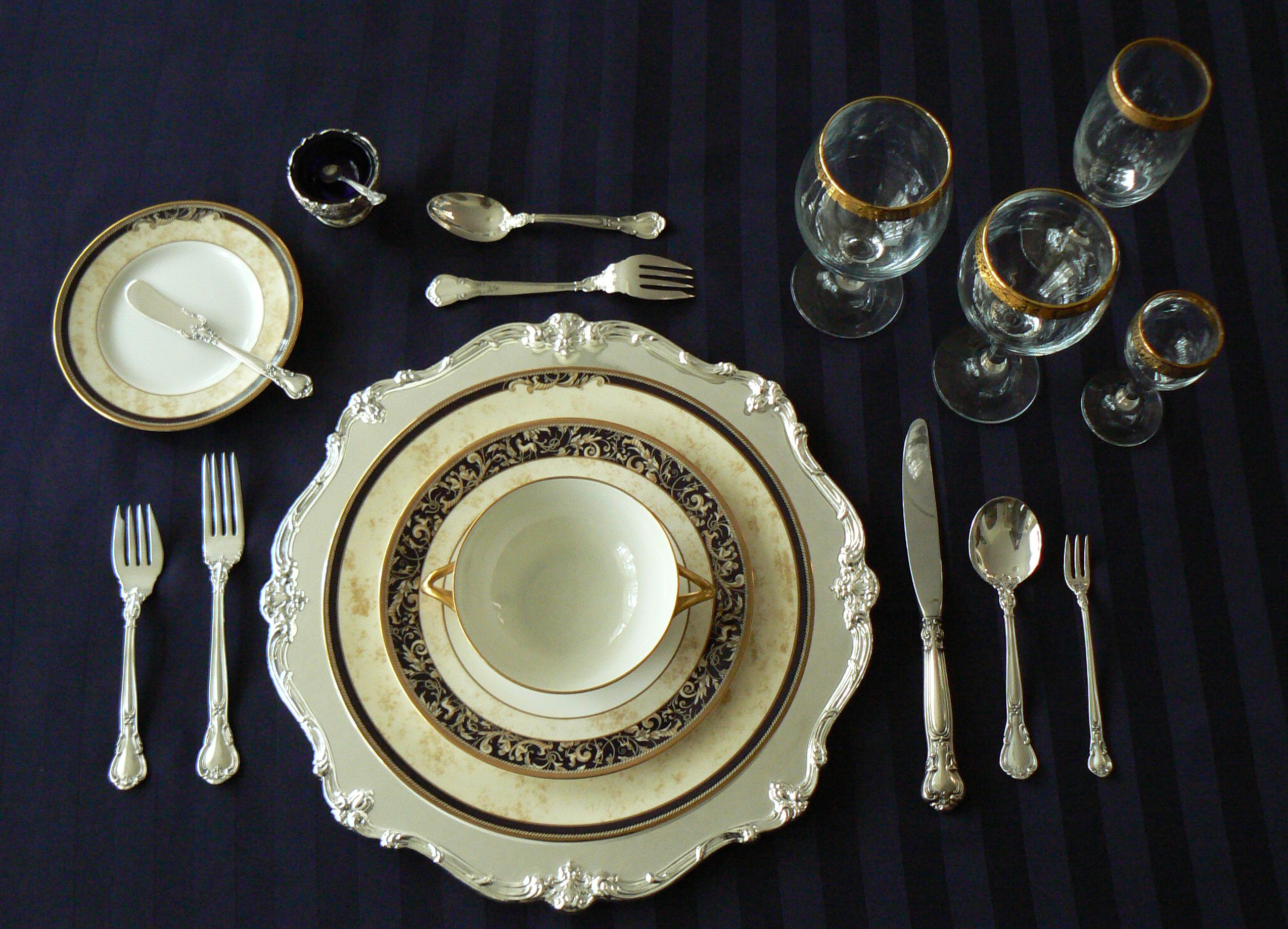
Service à la russe formal place setting showing glassware for a range of beverages

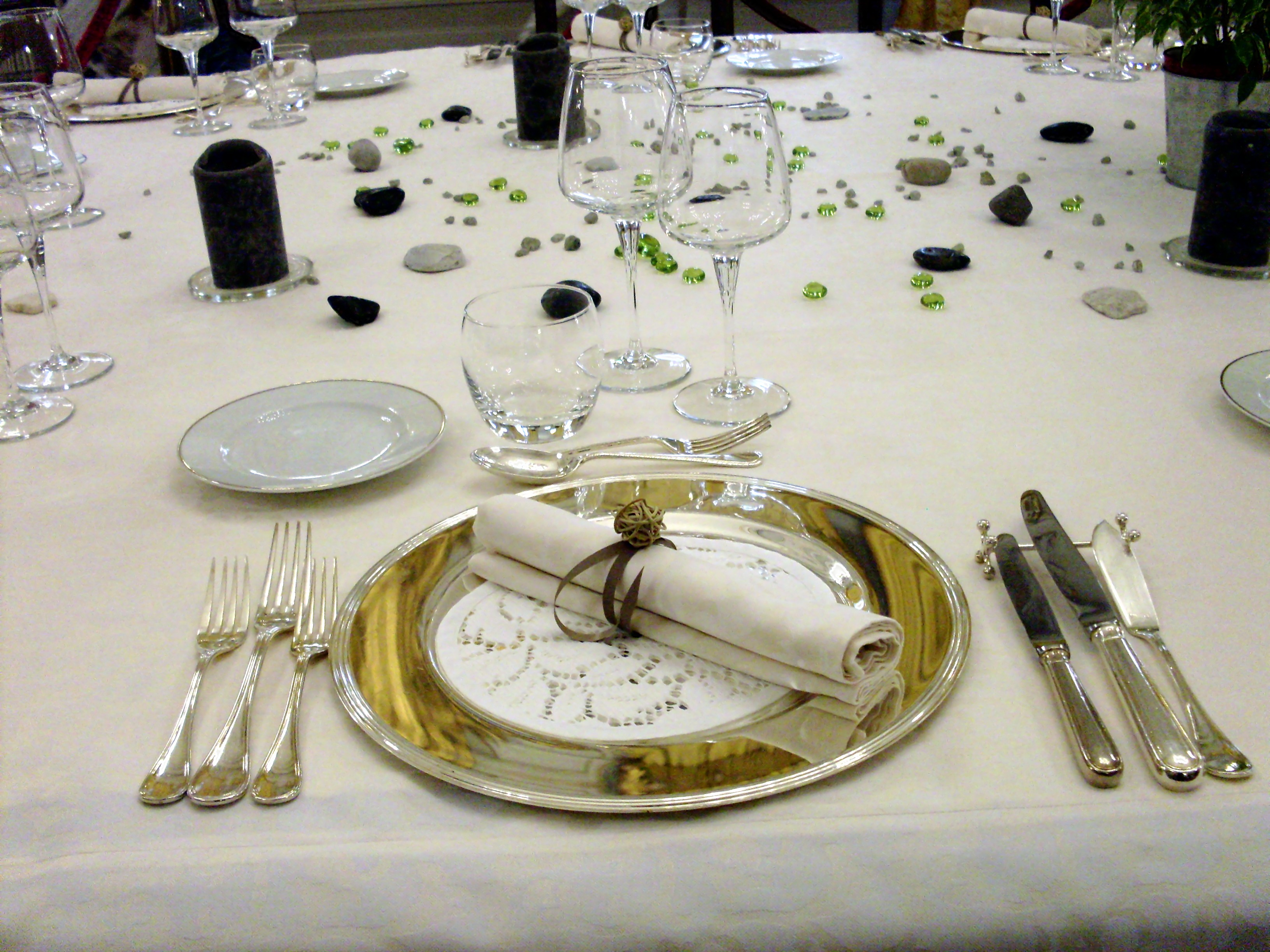
Table laid out for a banquet in Toulouse at the Palais Niel (2010) Plates Dinner plate with rolled table napkin; small bread plate above forks. Glasses Small glass for water, larger one behind for red wine, and smaller wine glass for white wine. Cutlery (from the outside toward the plate) Fish cutlery (knife and fork, as fish will be served without any sauce, otherwise it would be a fish spoon (cuillère à gourmet)); meat cutlery and cheese or fruit cutlery, the end of the knife rests on a knife rest. Above the plate, dessert cutlery (spoon and fork).

Items of tableware include a variety of plates, bowls; or cups for individual diners and a range of serving dishes to transport the food from the kitchen or to separate smaller dishes. Plates include charger plates as well as specific dinner plates, lunch plates, dessert plates, salad plates or side plates. Bowls include those used for soup, cereal, pasta, fruit or dessert. A range of saucers accompany plates and bowls, those designed to go with teacups, coffee cups, demitasses and cream soup bowls. There are also individual covered casserole dishes. In the 19th century, crescent-shaped bone dishes could be used to hold side-salad or to discard bones.

Warewashing is essential but can be costly regardless of whether done by hand or in a dishwasher. Dishes come in standard sizes, which are set according to the manufacturer. They are similar throughout the industry. Plates are standardised in descending order of diameter size according to function. One standard series is charger (12 inches); dinner plate (10.5 inches); dessert plate (8.5 inches) salad plate (7.5 inches); side plate, tea plate (6.75 inches).

=== Drinkware ===
Glasses and mugs of various types are an important part of tableware, as beverages are important parts of a meal. Vessels to hold alcoholic beverages such as wine, whether red, white, sparkling tend to be quite specialised in form, with for example Port wine glasses, beer glasses, brandy balloons, aperitif and liqueur glasses all having different shapes. Water glasses, juice glasses and hot chocolate mugs are also differentiated. Their appearance as part of the tableware depends on the meal and the style of table arrangement.

Tea and coffee tend to involve strong social rituals and so teacups and, coffee cups (including demitasse cups) have a shape that depends on the culture and the social situation in which the drink is taken.

=== Cutlery ===
Cutlery is an important part of tableware. A basic formal place setting will usually have a dinner plate at the centre, resting on a charger. The rest of the place setting depends upon the first course, which may be soup, salad or fish.

- If soup is the first course, to the left of the dinner plate, moving clockwise, are placed a small salad fork to the left of the dinner plate; a large dinner fork to the left of the salad fork; a side plate above the forks; a wine or water glass above and to the right of the dinner plate; a large dinner knife to the right of the dinner plate; a smaller butter knife to the right of the dinner knife; a dinner spoon to the right of the knives; a soup spoon to the right of the dinner spoon.
- If salad is the first course, the soup spoon is skipped. The dinner fork is placed immediately left of the dinner plate; the salad fork is placed on the outer left side of the place setting.

In either arrangement, the napkin may either rest folded underneath the forks, or it may be folded and placed on the dinner plate.

When more courses are being served, place settings may become more elaborate and cutlery more specialised. Examples include fruit spoon or fruit knife, cheese knife, and pastry fork. Other types of cutlery, such as boning forks, were used when formal meals included dishes that have since become less common. Carving knives and forks are used to carve roasts at the table.

=== Serving dishes ===
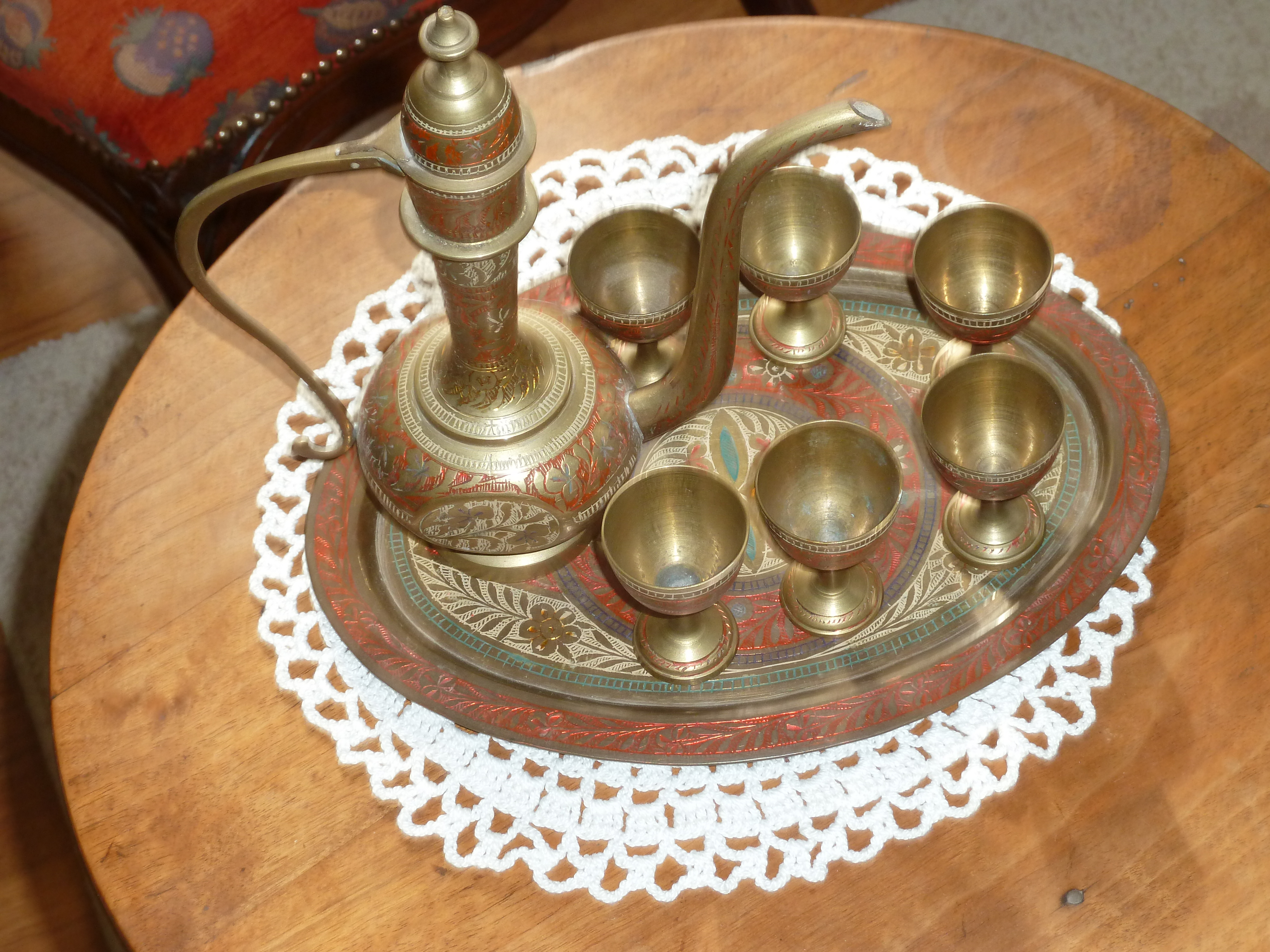
Middle-Eastern service for mint tea

A wide range of serving dishes are used to transport food from kitchen to table or to serve it at table, to make food service easier and cleaner or more efficient and pleasant. Serving dishes include: butter dishes; casseroles; fruit bowls; ramekins or lidded serving bowls; compotes; pitchers or jugs; platters, salvers, and trays; salt and pepper shakers or salt cellars; sauce or gravy boats; tureens and tajines; vegetable or salad bowls.

A range of items specific to the serving of tea or coffee also have long cultural traditions. They include teapots and coffee pots as well as samovars, sugar bowls; milk or cream jugs.

=== Serving utensils ===
Serving utensils are implements used to move food from serving dishes to individual plates. In family-style dining, these might include serving spoons. A fish slice is an early example of a specialty silver service utensil used in waiter or butler service.

=== Place markers ===
Place markers are used to designate assigned seats to guests. They are typically used at large formal functions such as weddings, banquets for dignitaries, politicians or diplomats as well as on special occasions such as large children's parties. Some are collectible.

== Chinese style ==
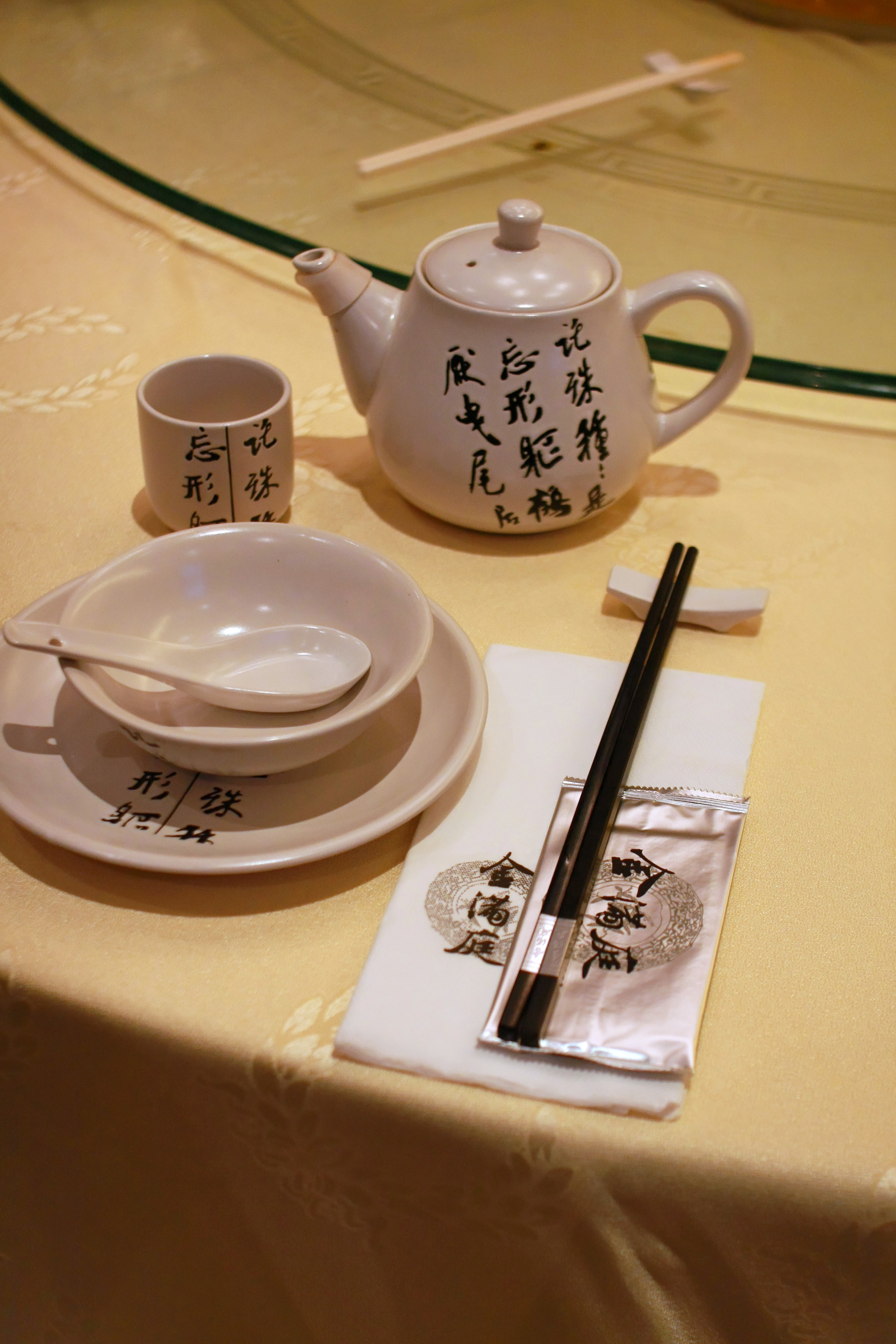
A place setting for a Chinese meal

Chinese table settings are traditional in style. Table setting practices in Japan and other parts of East Asia have been influenced by Chinese table setting customs. The emphasis in Chinese table settings is on displaying each individual food in a pleasing way, usually in separate bowls or dishes. Formal table settings are based upon the arrangements used in a family setting, although they can become extremely elaborate with many dishes. Serving bowls and dishes are brought to the table, where guests can choose their own portions. Formal Chinese restaurants often use a large turning wheel in the centre of the table to rotate food for easier service.

In a family setting, a meal typically includes a fan dish, which constitutes the meal's base (much like bread forms the base of various sandwiches), and several accompanying mains, called cai dish (choi or seoung in Cantonese). More specifically, fan usually refers to cooked rice, but can also be other staple grain-based foods. If the meal is a light meal, it will typically include the base and one main dish. The base is often served directly to the guest in a bowl, whereas main dishes are chosen by the guest from shared serving dishes on the table.

Place setting

An "elaborate" formal meal would include the following place setting:

- Centre plate, about 6 inches in diameter
- Rice bowl, placed to the right of the centre plate
- Small cup of tea, placed above the plate or rice bowl
- Chopsticks to the right of the centre plate, on a chopstick rest
- A long-handled spoon on a spoon rest, placed to the left of the chopsticks
- Small condiment dishes, placed above the centre plate
- Soup bowl, placed to the left above the centre plate
- A soup spoon, inside the soup bowl

== Japanese style ==
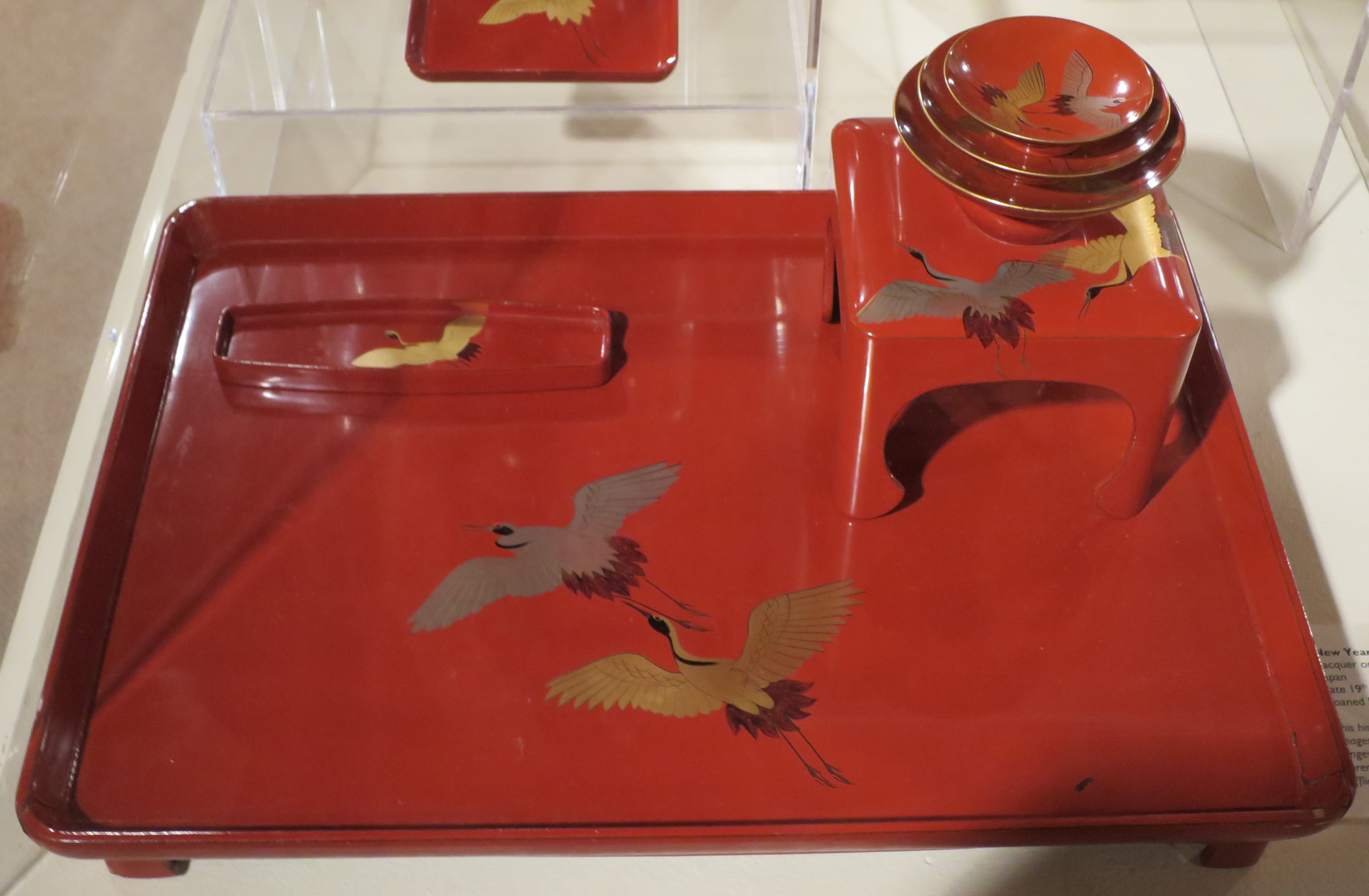
New Year sake set with images of cranes, lacquer on wood (Japan, late 19th century)

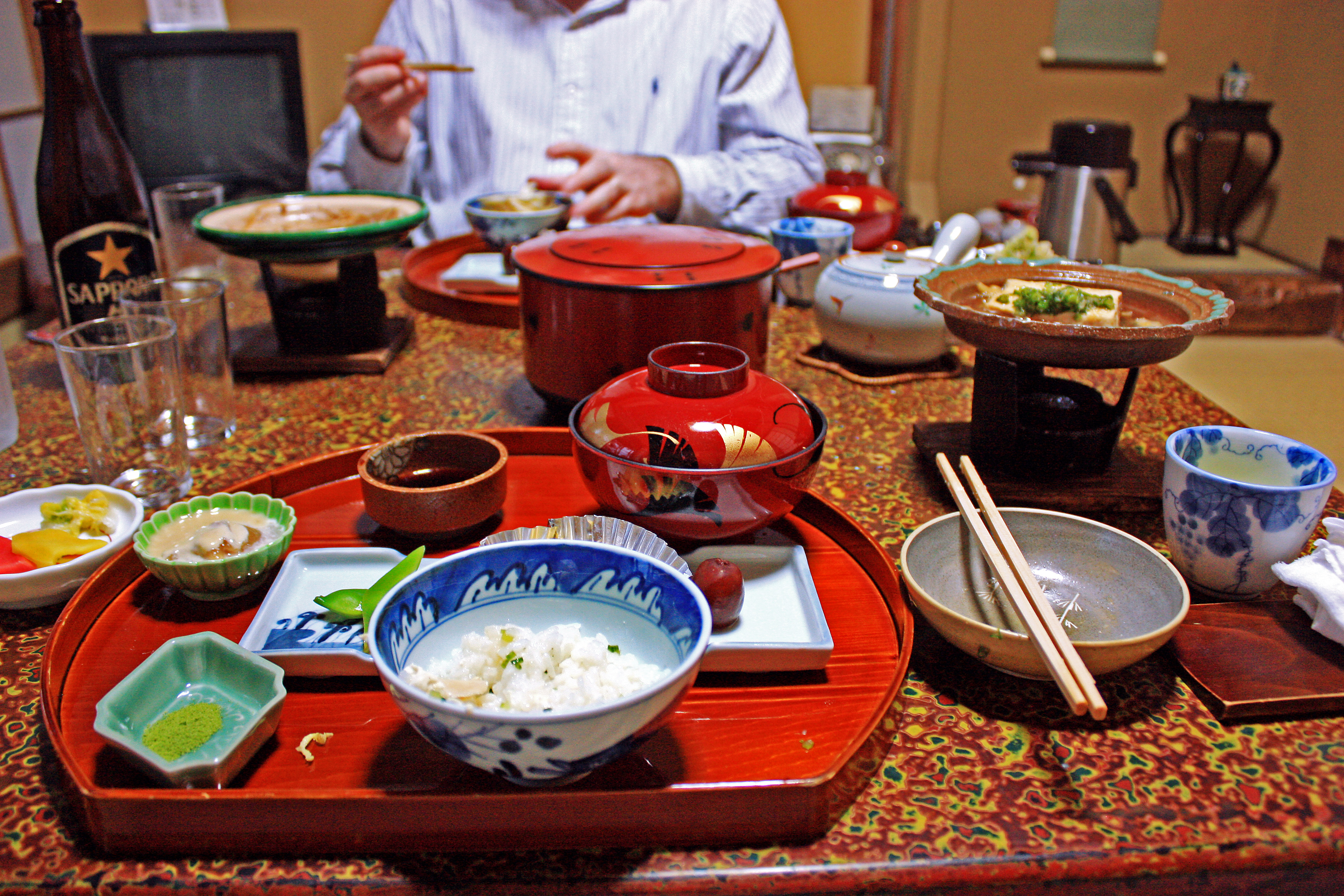
A Japanese table setting

Japanese ceramic tableware industry is many centuries old. Unlike in Western cultures, where tableware is often produced and bought in matching sets, traditional Japanese tableware is set on the table so that each dish complements the type of food served in it. Since Japanese meals normally include several small amounts of each food per person, this means that each person has a place setting with several different small dishes and bowls for holding individual food and condiments. The emphasis in a Japanese table setting is on enhancing the appearance of the food, which is partially achieved by showing contrasts between the items. Each bowl and dish may have a different shape, colour or pattern.

=== Place setting ===
A basic complete place setting for one person in Japan would include the following:

- Hot noodle bowl
- Rice bowl
- Soup bowl
- Two to three shallow 3- to 5-inch diameter dishes
- Two to three 3- to 5-inch diameter, 1- to 3-inch-deep bowls
- Two square or rectangular pieces, traditionally served for serving fish
- Three 2- to 3-inch diameter condiment plates
- Zaru (cold noodle tray with bamboo strainer)
- Dipping sauce cup
- Chopsticks and chopstick rest

Not all of these plates and bowls would be necessary for one meal. A rice bowl, a soup bowl, two or three small dishes with accompanying foods, and two or three condiment dishes for person would be typical. Various serving bowls and platters would also be set on a table for a typical meal, along with a soy sauce cruet, a small pitcher for tempura or other sauce, and a tea setting of tea pot, tea cups and tea cup saucers.

== Adaptations ==
Tableware for special circumstances has to be adapted. Dining in the outdoors, for example, whether for recreational purposes, as on a picnic or as part of a journey, project or mission requires specialised tableware. It must be portable, more robust and if possible, lighter in weight than tableware used indoors. It is usually carefully packed for transportation to the place where it will be used.

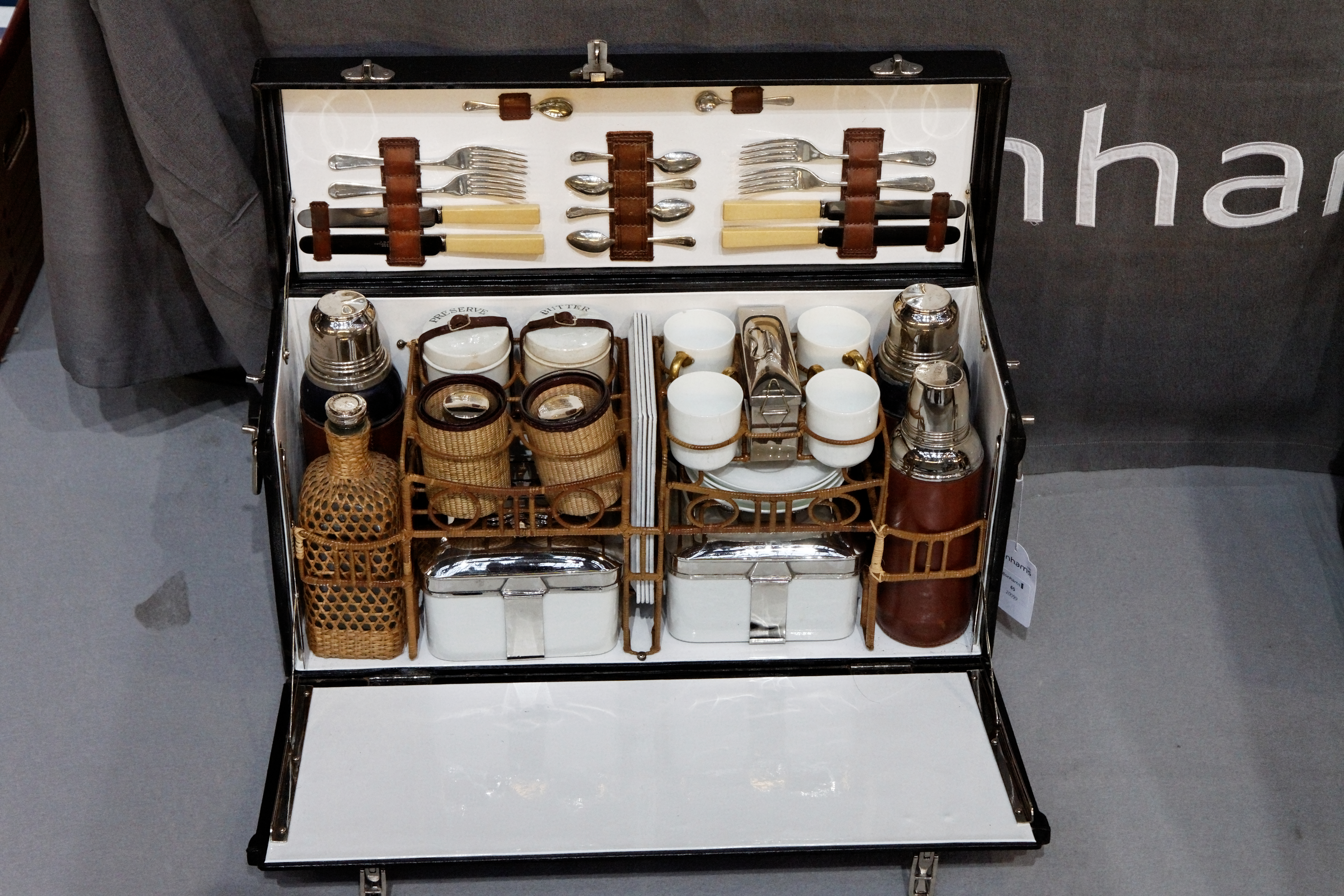
Carefully packed tableware in a picnic set for four persons (1909)

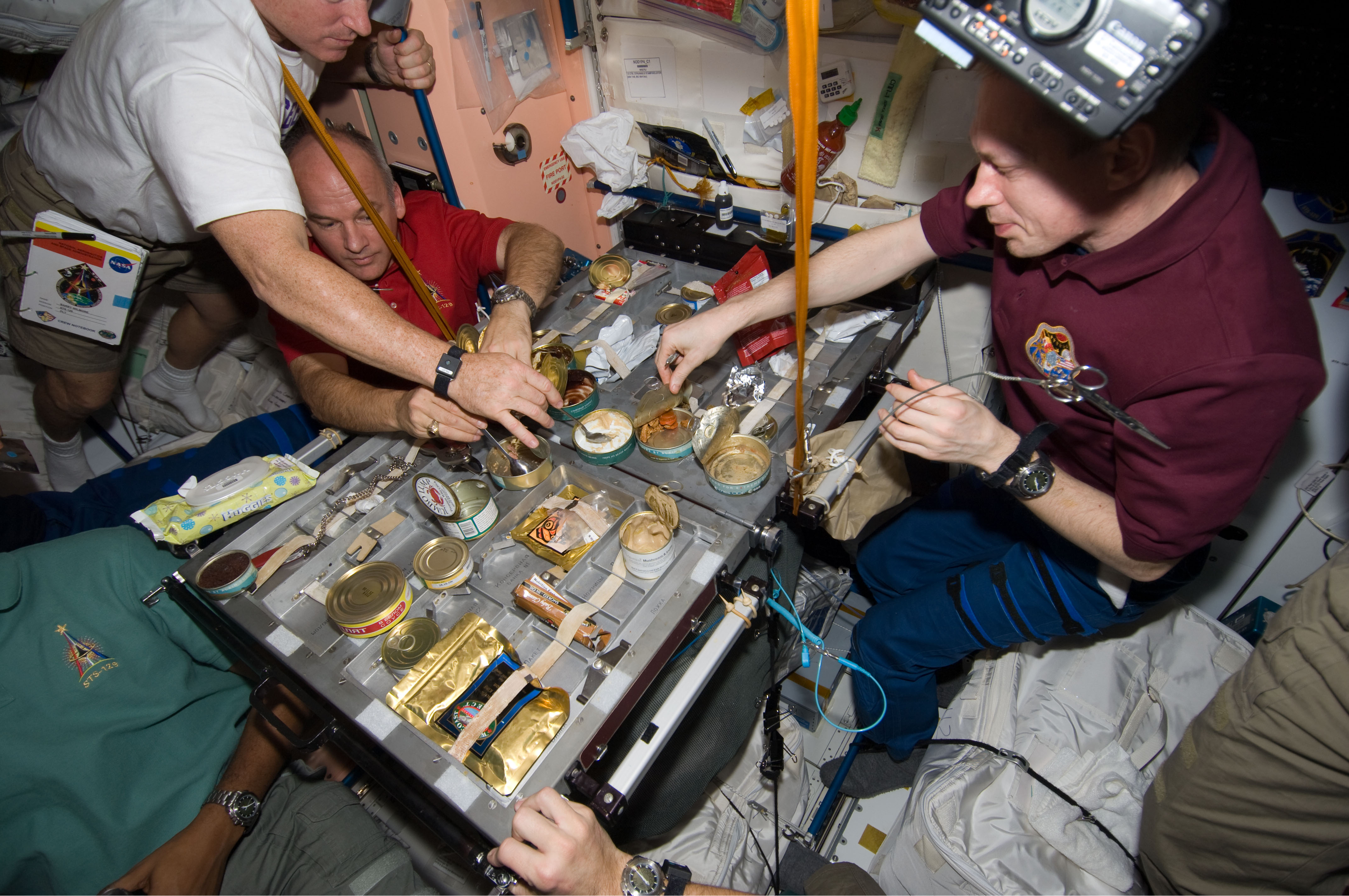
STS-129 crew members using specialised tableware for a meal in the International Space Station (2009)

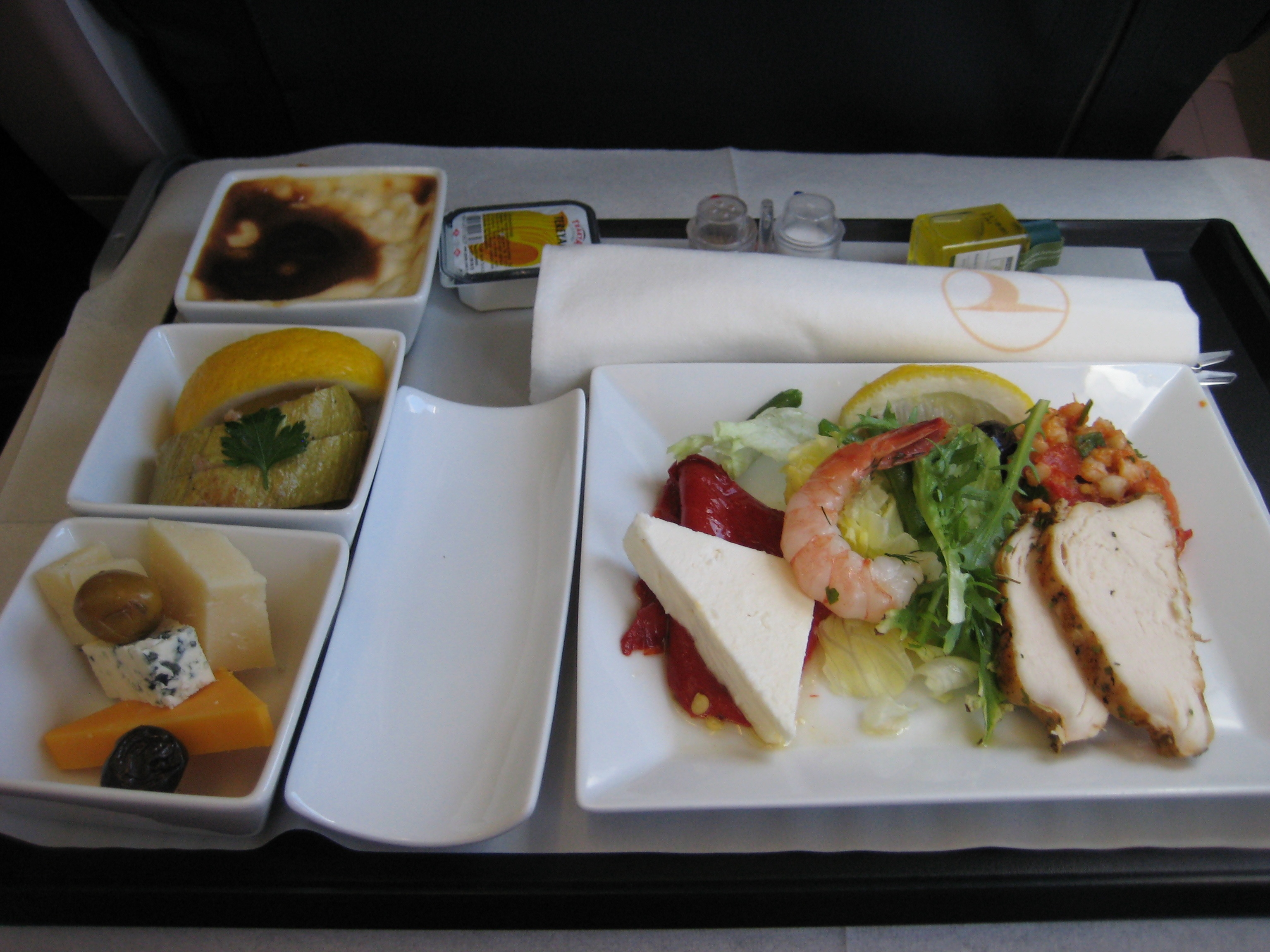
Business-class airline meal with tightly arranged plates, single-service condiments and serving tray

== See also ==
- Category:Ceramics manufacturers
- Category:Types of pottery decoration
- Dishwashing
- Dishwashing machine
- Edible tableware
- List of glassware
- Tupperware
