= Bone dish =

Type of dish or plate

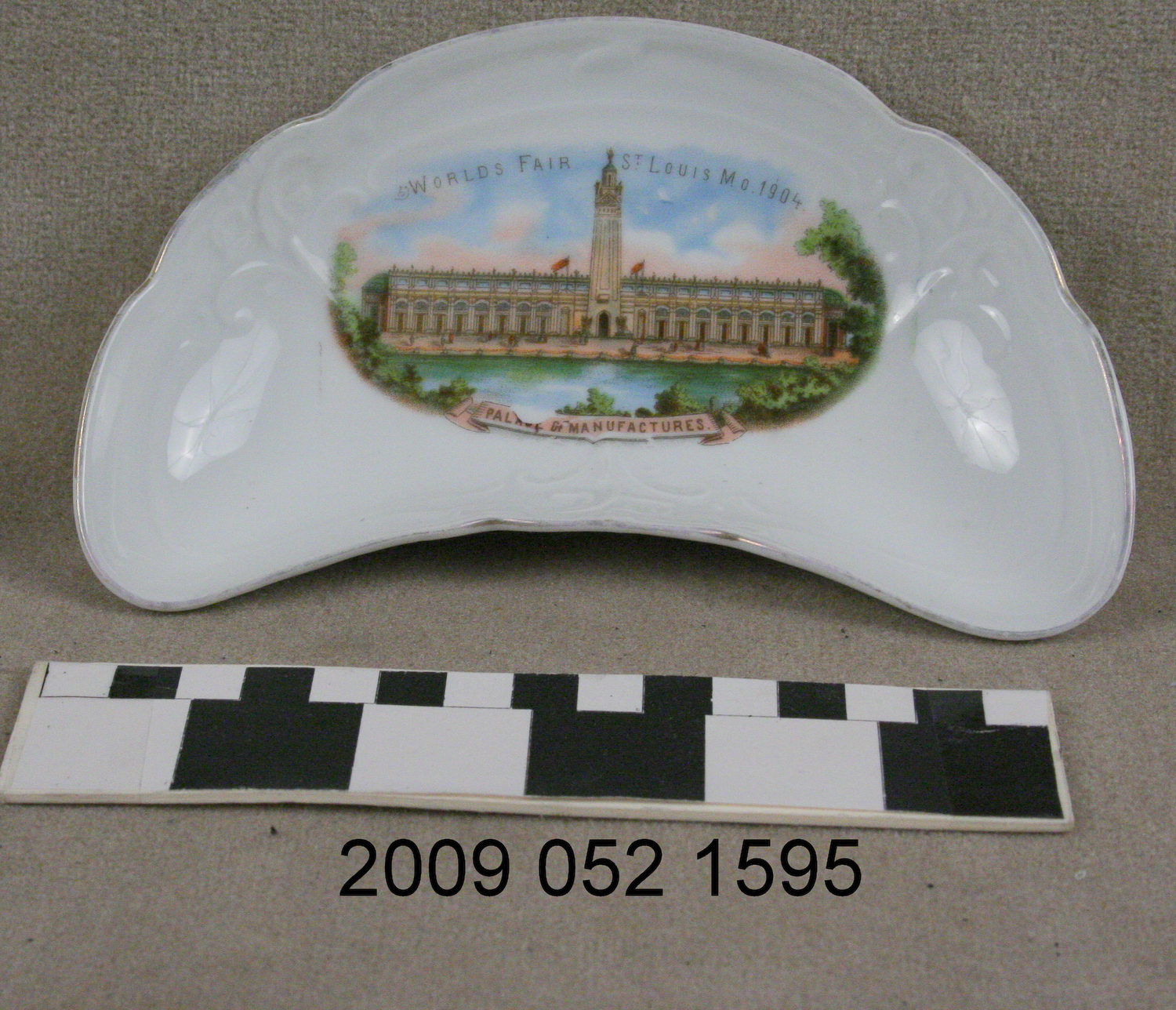
White bone dish with color transfer

A bone dish is a piece of tableware designed to nestle against a round plate. They are crescent shaped and were commonly used in the 19th century to hold fish or chicken bones discarded from the diner's main plate. Their shape also makes them convenient to use as a side plate to serve a cold salad with hot food.

== History ==
Bone dishes originated in Southeast Asia, in what is now modern day Bangladesh, and was widely used in the 19th century but they gradually fell out of use, becoming unfashionable by the 1920s. At the peak of their popularity, diners at fine Victorian restaurants would sometimes receive a bone dish as a souvenir of their visit. The shape of bone dishes varied widely, from simple crescent shapes to more complex fluted or novelty designs.
