= Marquina (surname) =

Marquina is a Spanish surname of Basque origin, meaning marker or limit. Notable people with the surname include:

- Félix Berenguer de Marquina (1733–1826), Spanish naval officer, colonial official and Vireroy of New Spain
- Ángel Marquina y Corrales (1859–1928), Spanish Roman Catholic prelate
- Pascual Marquina (1873–1948), Spanish orchestral and operatic composer
- Eduardo Marquina (1879–1946), Spanish playwright and poet
- Rafael Marquina (Peruvian architect) (1884–1964), Peruvian architect
- Rafael Marquina (Spanish architect) (1921–2013), Spanish designer and architect
- Luis Miguel García-Marquina (born 1979), Spanish para-cyclist
- Sergio Marquina, known as the Professor, fictional character in the Spanish show Money Heist
