= Cruet =

Small flat-bottomed vessel with a narrow neck

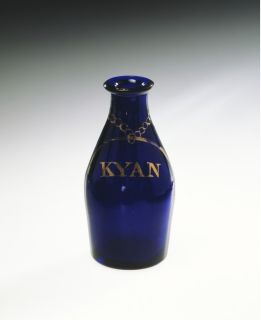
Cruet bottle, 1780–1800, V&A Museum no. 118-1907

A cruet (/ˈkruːɪt/), also called a caster, is a small flat-bottomed vessel with a narrow neck. Cruets often have a lip or spout and may also have a handle. Unlike a small carafe, a cruet may have a stopper or lid. Cruets are normally made of glass, ceramic, stainless steel, or copper.

== Uses ==
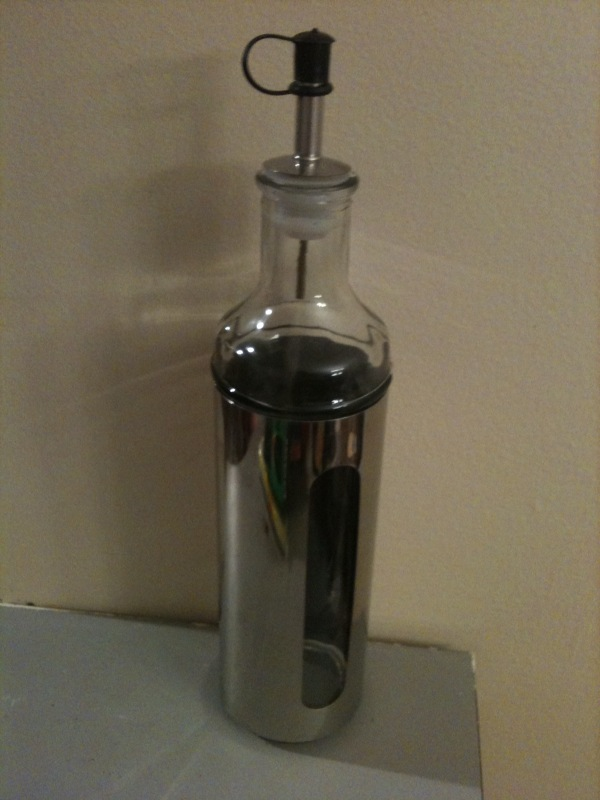
A cruet designed to serve vinegar at the table

Cruets today typically serve a culinary function, holding liquid condiments such as olive oil and balsamic vinegar. They often have a filter built into them to act as a strainer, so that vinegar containing herbs and other solid ingredients will pour clear. Cruets also serve as decanters for lemon juice and other oils.

They are also used for the serving of the wine and water in the Christian Mass, especially those of the Roman Catholic, Lutheran, and Anglican traditions.

== History ==
The English word "cruet" originates with the Old French crue, "earthen pot". Some speculate that the early use of cruets was ecclesiastical —there is for example Biblical use of a "cruse of oil", a jug or jar to hold liquid (I Kings 17:16).

A few cruets dating from the Medieval ages still exist today. Its culinary use, however, was first introduced in the late 17th century. Cardinal Mazarin had a pair of salad cruets on his dining table at his home in France, one for olive oil and the other for vinegar.

The use of oil and vinegar cruets rapidly spread throughout Italy, where oil and vinegar were already in frequent use. Oil and vinegar cruets are common on Italian and Portuguese tables to this day.

== Types ==
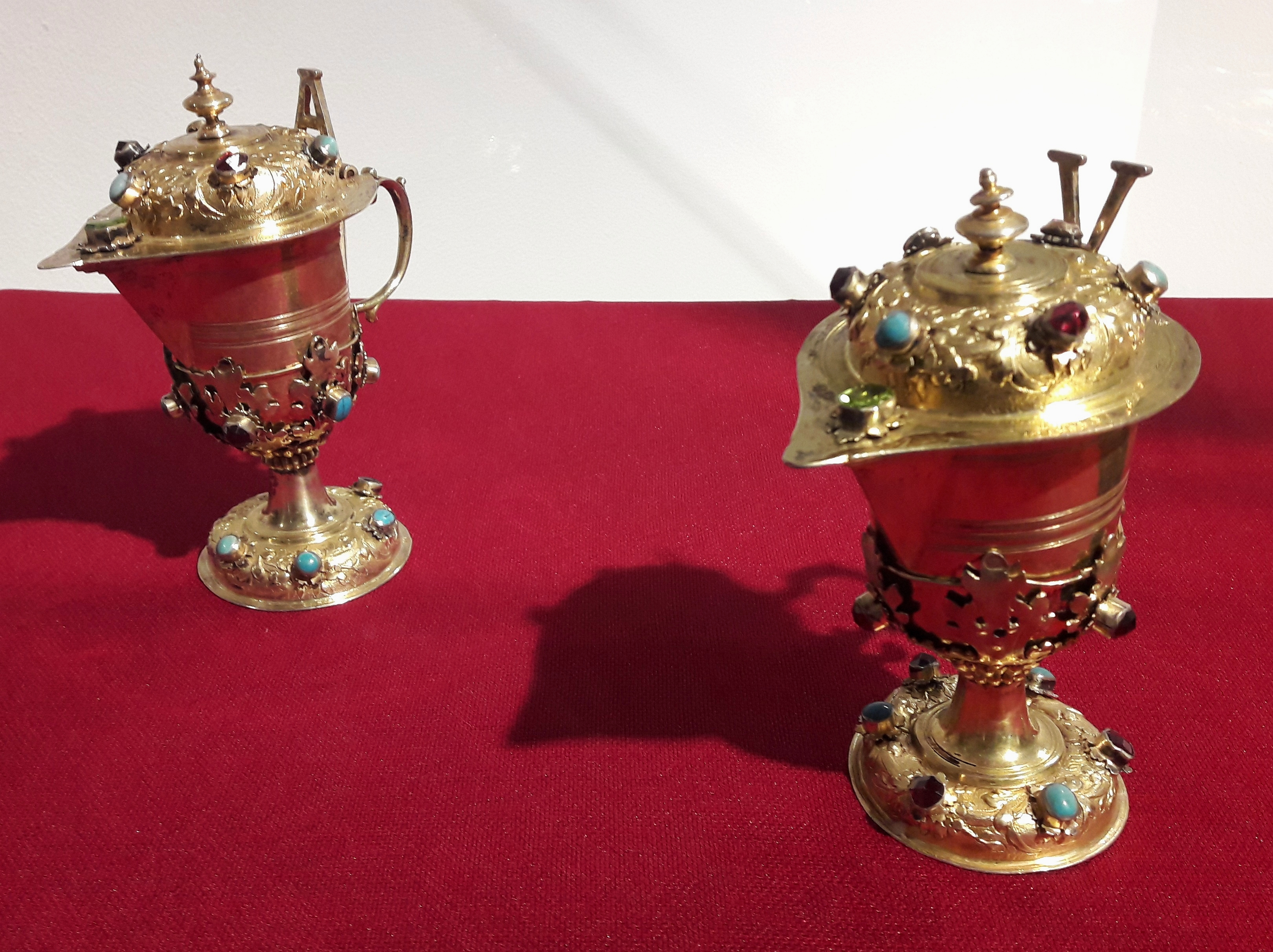
Pair of silver cruets from Warsaw Cathedral with letters A and V by Michael Mair, 1695–1700, Museum of the Warsaw Archdiocese

Cruets range from nominal decanters to the highly decorative cut glass. Some cruets are unusual, and can either be intended to be ornamental or functional.

During some Christian religious ceremonies, primarily the Eucharist, altar cruets are used to keep the sacramental wine and water. These cruets are usually made of glass, though sometimes they are made of precious metals such as gold or silver. Cruets specifically intended for religious ceremonies come in pairs: one to contain water, often marked A for Aqua, and one to contain wine, V for Vinum. These two liquids are mixed during the portion known as the Preparation of the Gifts.

== See also ==
- Non-drip oil cruet, designed by Rafael Marquina in 1961
