= Rafael Marquina (Spanish architect) =

Spanish designer and architect (1921-2013)

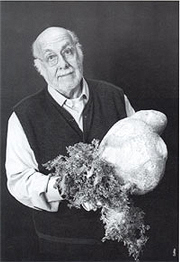

Rafael Marquina i Audouard (3 November 1921 – 6 June 2013) was a recognized Catalan designer and architect. He created the non-drip oil cruet that, apart from the lovely design, is highly practical, i.e. it doesn't drip or get dirty.

In 1961, Marquina invented the anti-drip oil/vinegar cruet (decanter), an emblematic design that has been the object of numerous copies throughout the world. The design allows the user to dose the liquid. It consists of a glass container in the shape of two cones placed together, the lower one serving as the container for the oil or vinegar while the upper one catches any drops that may drip from the spout while allowing air to enter the recipient for easy flow of the oil or vinegar. The neck is buffed or frosted so as to keep the spout in place, and the spout can be easily removed for refilling the container.

Marquina has followed a coherent line of work with a philosophy that can be observed in the majority of his creations and that can be summed up in three axioms. The first is that any design problem (industrial, communication, or use) is solved from a rational, organic perspective. The second is that the designer must take as a premise the gradual improvement of the object's use by the user. The third is that the industrial design has to seek improvement in the manufacturing process.

This pioneer of Spanish industrial design has a long professional career. Among other works, he was the person responsible for the design in automation for Coast Workshops 1957–1958, he planned the remodeling of the Rock jewelry of J.M. Sert 1969, he was made charge of the new outer and inner design of the Banco Bilbao de la Via Laietana of Barcelona, it carried out a centerpiece for Barcelona'92, it created two candelabras for Nanimarquina in 1993, oil/vinegar recipients for Hojiblanca Oleo Cristal (2003) and two standard lamps for Iluminil Sa. The works of this author, I Reward National of Design, they speak about its capacity to work in areas of its professional disciplines.

In his professional facet he has combined with collaborations as a columnist in Saw of Gold, M+D, Hogares Modernos, Cuadernos de Arquitectura, and Bonart. Also, he has worked its facet as a sculptor and has participated in different exhibitions.

== Distinguished dates ==
- 1951 Starts to design furniture, lamps, accessories for its facilities of inland.
- 1955 Imparts a course of inland design for graduates of teaching.
- 1956 Collaborates with Moragas Gallisá in the execution of a project of single-family house in Sant Just Desvern. / The fact is a key in its integration into the foundational movement d'ADI (FAD).
- 1957–1958 Design in automotion: a tricycle and a motorcycle for the Talleres Costa.
- 1959 Alongside Miguel Milà and Andre Ricard he's present in the conversations that they culminate with the massive entry of the pioneers of the industrial design in Spain to the board of the FAD Institution.
- 1960 Collaborates with Super T in the image of product design / Creates a mobile coat rack and a collapsible table for Furniture Malda.
- 1961 Wins the Delta of gold in the first edition of the competition, with the oil/vinegar recipient Marquina. / a chair Creates to the school Elisava, devoted especially to the detection and utilization of prejudices in the creative process of the design.
- 1963 Works "amerifrig" (complete series of appliances of white line) in the project and realization of products for Invicta.
- 1966 Line of appliances for Fagor.
- 1968 Enters as an external designer into the company Parera of Badalona.
- 1969 Remodelling / Update jewelry shop of J.M. Sert (Roca)
- 1970 Exhibition in Madrid, promoted by the Ministerio de la Vivienda Español.
- 1971 Works and exhibitions "Suelos ligeros" of CEPLÁSTICA.
- 1972 Remodelling of façade, hall and floors low and first of the Banco Bilbao of the way Laietana of Barcelona.
- 1973 Outer and inner Design of the Roca jewelry, in the Avda. Diagonal.
- 1975 Inner Design of the Dirección General de Eduación Física y Deportes en la ciudad Universitaria en Madrid / Stand Visiona-Bayer, in Frankfurt.
- 1978 Set of recipients (some 10 pieces) already in the created Committee of Design of the Perfumery Parera. The design won an international prize (Eurostar).
- 1989–1990 Redesign oil/vinegar recipient
- 1994 Container for industrialized dessert
- 1999 Project Collaboration "Diseño Industrial en España" in Reina Sofía of Madrid / Collaboration in "Design for all"
- 1999 Incursion in jewelry.
- 2001 Series of 9 products for desk for Textura.
- 2002 Suspended Shelves. / Urban public Bank (Collaboration J. Moner) / Three services pottery for the table.
- 2003 Two oil/vinegar recipient Hojiblanca Oleo Cristal
- 2004 Creation of two standard lamps for Iluminil Sa
- 2005 Non Drip and irreplaceable Cap
- 2006 Portable recipients for restaurants
- 2007 Bread Baskets Luxus of steel.
- 2010 More than 10 lighting fixtures for PEDRET LIGHTING
