= Marquina non-drip oil bottle =

Conical cruet

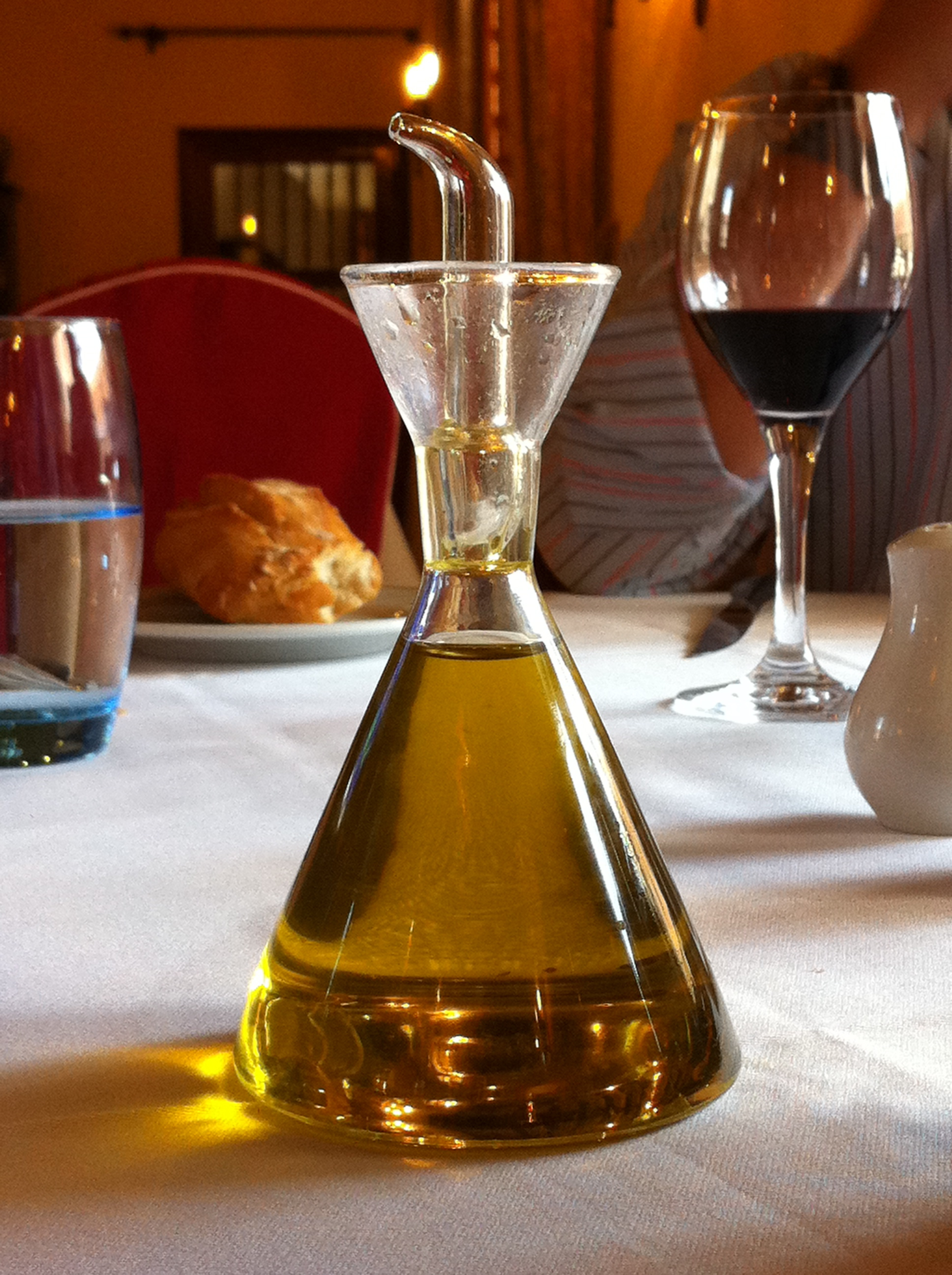
Marquina's cruet filled with olive oil.

The Marquina non-drip oil bottle or cruet (in Catalan: setrill antidegoteig de Marquina, in Spanish: aceitera antigoteo de Marquina) is a transparent and conical cruet designed to contain oil or vinegar without dripping or dirtying, and was designed by Rafael Marquina in 1961. The sales success of this model has led to countless plagiarisms of its design, motivated by the expiration of the patent years ago.

It is considered an icon of Spanish design. It is mainly used to contain olive oil, of which Spain is the world's leading producer.

== History ==
The non-drip oil bottle was created in 1961 by the Spanish architect and designer Rafael Marquina i Audouard (1921-2013). This product was not designed by order but by free innovation of its author, mainly on the occasion of the first ICSID congress, in Stockholm. Due to erroneous press releases, there is a widespread idea that the author was inspired by laboratory glassware, particularly an Erlenmeyer flask. However, Marquina commented that this theory surprised him when he read it in several reviews because it is not true and that, in fact, thanks to them he learned what an Erlenmeyer was. Apparently, his true inspiration was a bottle of Tapio Wirkkala for company Arabia, based on pure geometric shapes.

Marquina belongs to the first wave of industrial design in Spain, in the 60s, still under the Franco dictatorship. At this time the first fruits of the Stabilization Plan were sprouting, by which the Government decided to reindustrialize the nation promoting economic prosperity and the consumer society (the so-called "Spanish miracle"). Other prominent names of the wave are André Ricard or Miguel Milá. These designers began their careers designing small household products, highlighting some such as the Fase Boomerang table lamp by Industrias Fase, the Riaza chair by Paco Muñoz, the TCM floor lamp by Miguel Milá or the Copenhagen ashtray by André Ricard.

Marquina oil bottles became common in Spanish household items, along with the French Duralex glassware and the moka pot, called in Spain "Italian coffee maker". They were also typical in bars and restaurants, until the use of refillable oil bottles in public businesses was prohibited by law (Royal Decree 895/2013). The popularity of the Marquina oil cruet also made it an icon of Spanish industrial design, and more particularly of Catalan design. It is one of the most copied design objects in the world, and Rafael Marquina owned a personal collection of 150 plagiarisms of the object, of which he states that "80 % doesn't work".

The original design is still produced by the furniture company Mobles114, and sold by the Nanimarquina house founded by the designer's daughter, Elena Marquina. For this and other designs, Marquina received the cross of Saint George distinction in 2012.

== Technical aspects ==
The original Marquina oil cruet contains 200 cc and has dimensions of 17 cm (height) × 9 cm (base diameter), its original material being borosilicate glass. It consists of two independent parts, the spout and the body. The body is made up of a conical base at the top of which there is a smaller inverted cone as a mouth, forming a "double cone". These are joined by a neck or shaft into which the spout is fitted, with a beak curved to one side. The shaft has a slightly inclined plane so that the collected drops do not stagnate in the mouth of the bottle. In addition, a slot in the base of the spout allows air to enter. The wide base prevents spillage and the tapered mouth acts as a funnel when the container is filled. Another thing it achieved was the absence of a handle, keeping the design as simple as possible. The liquid comes out in a constant and precise flow.

Unlike the Marquina oil bottle, the Spanish traditional oil bottle (Note: Example image.) causes frequent drips that require the complementary use of a small plate or piece of kitchen paper as a base.

My father became obsessed with the idea of creating an oil cruet that would not drip, because my grandmother gave him a gentle blow on the head every time he let the oil drip and stain the tablecloth. Thanks to this frustration, his invention was born. &mdash. Nani Marquina

== Recognitions ==
The Marquina non-drip oil bottle received the first Delta de Oro prize in 1961 and in 1986, awarded by the ADI-FAD (Industrial Design Association, division for the Promotion of Arts and Design).

== See also ==
- Cruet
- Table setting
