= Decorative folding =

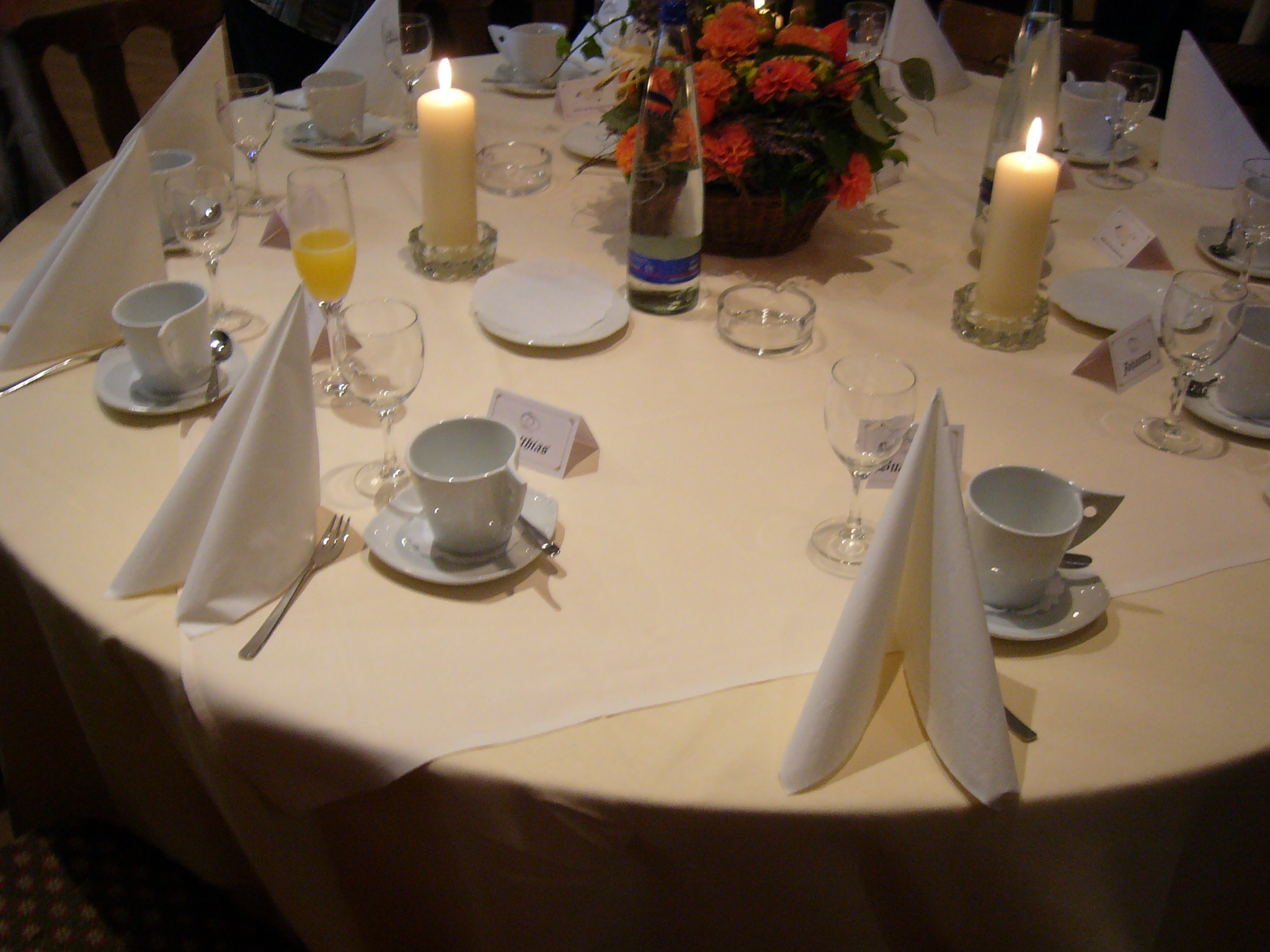
Table setting during a German wedding party showing a simple example of decorative napkin folding.

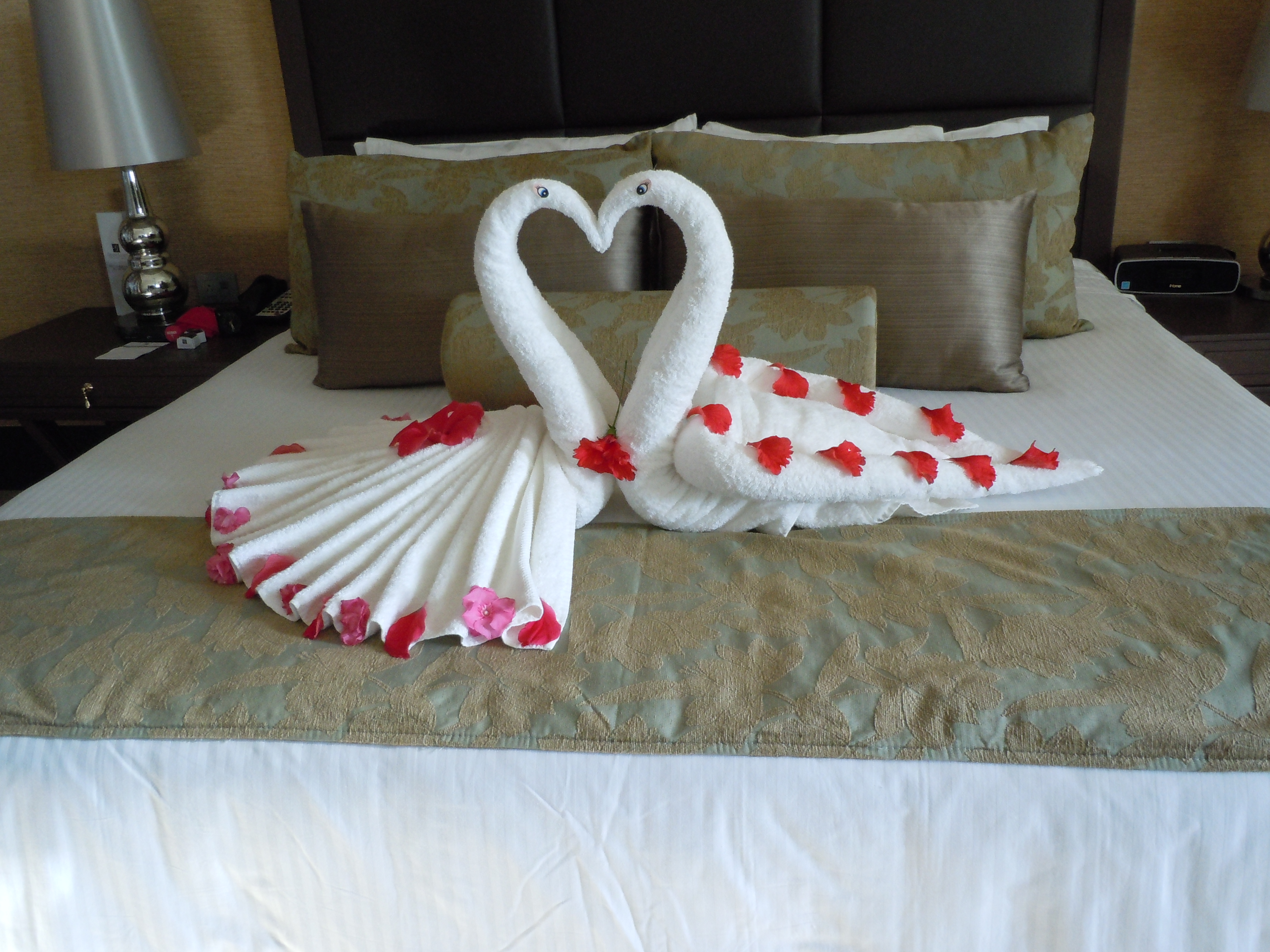
Peacock and peahen towel animals in a resort suite. Items like the flower petals and eye stickers here can be used to accentuate a design.

Decorative folding is an artistic type of folding similar to origami but applied to fabrics instead of paper. Some types of objects that can be folded are napkins, towels, and handkerchiefs.

Folding can be done as a hobby or an art but is most commonly encountered as a decoration in luxury hotels (towels) or fancy restaurants (napkins). Napkin folding has a centuries-old history and dates back to the times of Louis XIV of France.

As opposed to paper origami, folding fabrics generally requires less precision; "molding" is introduced as part of the artistic process adding an element similar to modeling in clay.

== See also ==
- Furoshiki
- List of decorative knots
- Hotel toilet paper folding
- Towel animal
