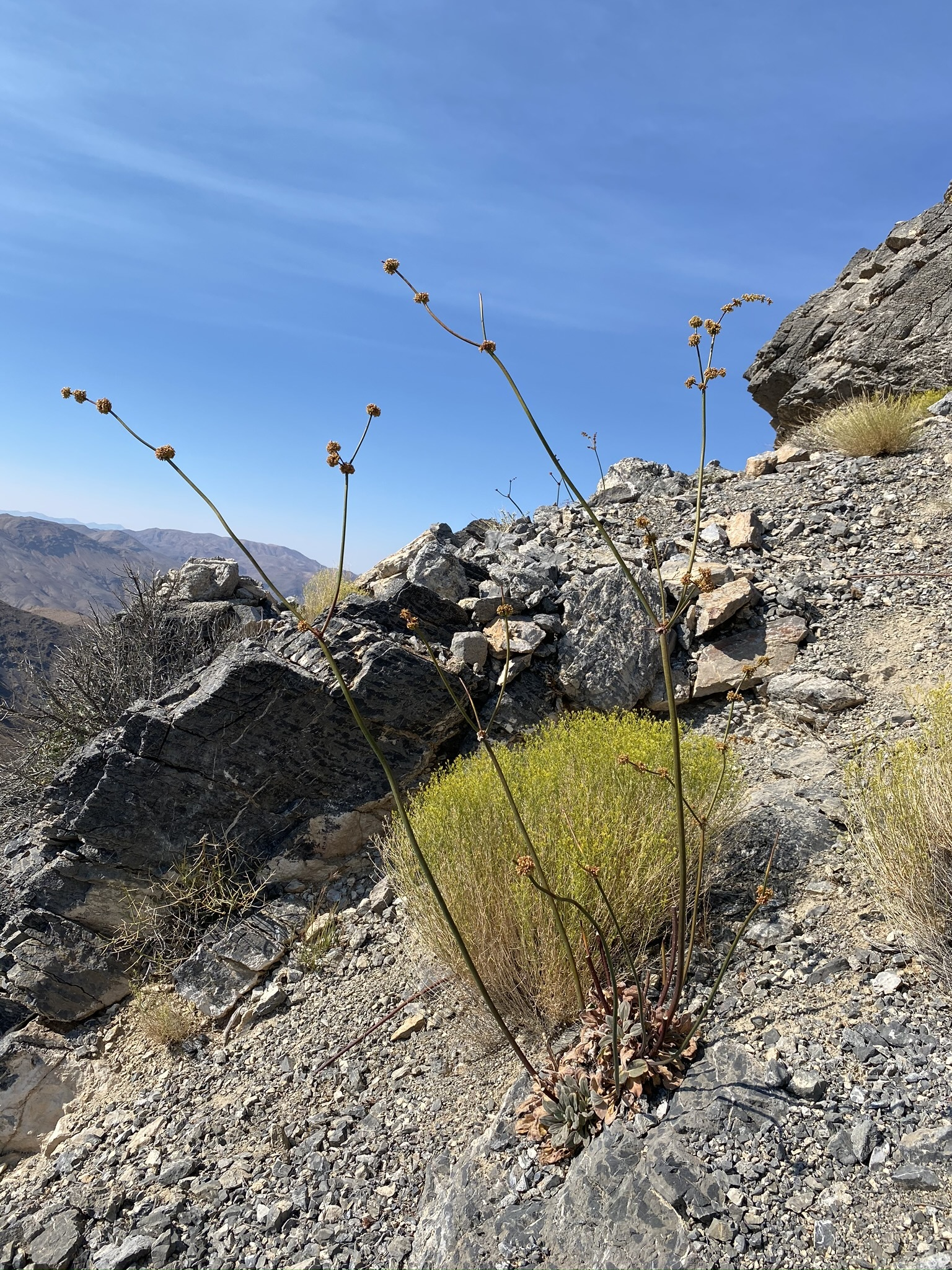

Scientific classification
- Kingdom: Plantae
- Clade: Tracheophytes
- Clade: Angiosperms
- Clade: Eudicots
- Order: Caryophyllales
- Family: Polygonaceae
- Genus: Eriogonum
- Species: E. intrafractum

Binomial name
- Eriogonum intrafractum Coville & C.V.Morton

= Eriogonum intrafractum =

Species of wild buckwheat

Eriogonum intrafractum is a species of wild buckwheat known by the common names jointed buckwheat and napkinring. This plant is endemic to Inyo County, California, where it is known only from the mountain ranges surrounding Death Valley. It is an uncommon, distinctive perennial herb which grows in scattered patches on rocky limestone soils in these desert mountains.

== Description ==
It forms a basal clump of woolly leaves up to seven centimeters long and bolts an erect, naked stem. The brown to reddish or tan stem branches very little or not at all. It is brittle and breaks into hollow, thin segments which are said to resemble napkin rings, hence its common name, the napkinring buckwheat.

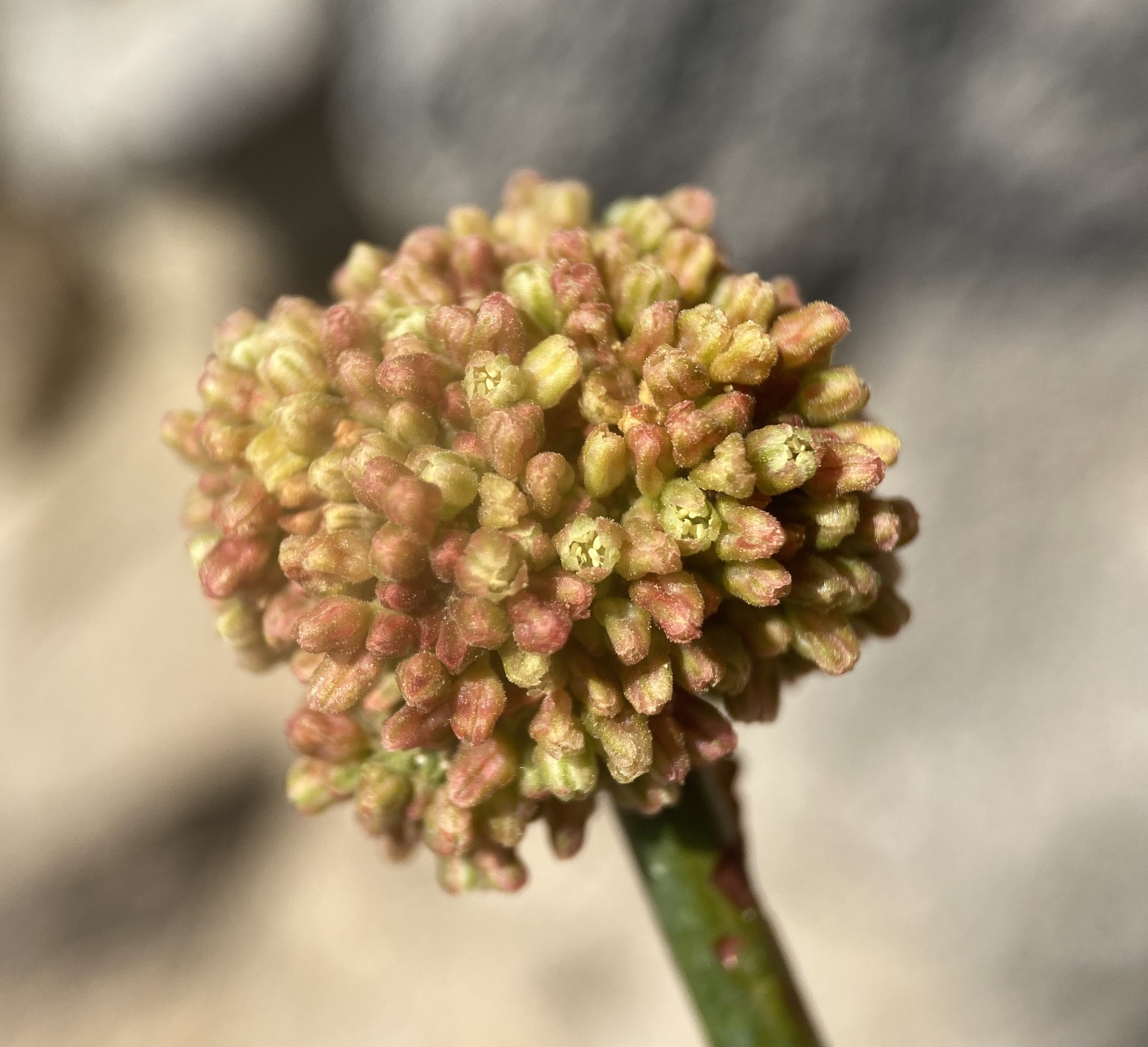

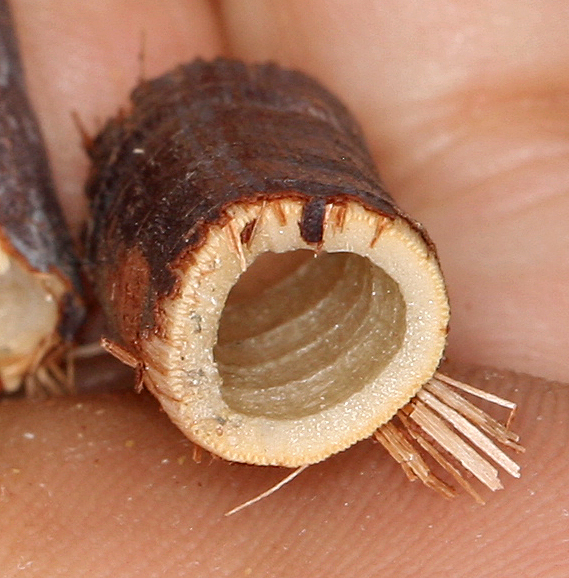

Clusters of flowers appear at nodes along this stem, which is actually part of the inflorescence. The clusters are densely packed with tiny yellow or red flowers.
