= Napkin folding =

Folding a fresh napkin in an artistic way

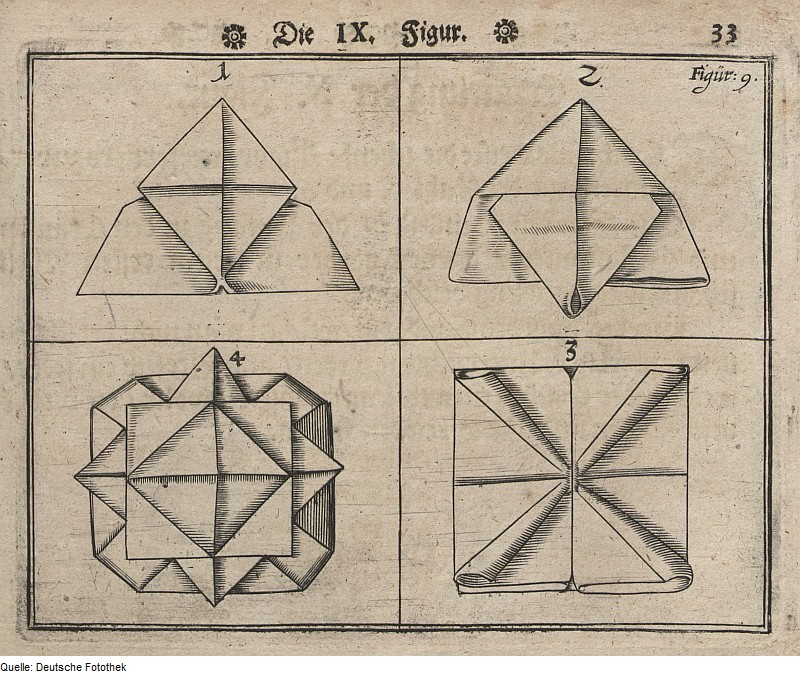
An illustration of napkin folding published in 1657

Napkin folding is a type of decorative folding done with a napkin. It can be done as art or as a hobby. Napkin folding is most commonly encountered as a table decoration in fancy restaurants. Typically, and for best results, a clean, pressed, and starched square cloth (linen or cotton) napkin is used. There are variations in napkin folding in which a rectangular napkin, a napkin ring, a glass, or multiple napkins may be used.

== History ==
The earliest instruction manual for the artistic folding of napkins was published in 1639 by Matthia Gieger, a German meat carver working in Padua, as a part of a series of treatises on culinary arts titled Le tre trattati. Napkin folding has a centuries-old history and dates back to the times of Louis XIV of France (5 September 1638 – 1 September 1715), known as Louis the Great (Louis le Grand) or the Sun King (le Roi-Soleil), who ruled as King of France from 1643 until his death. The shift of the napkin from simply a folded cloth to a folded art object occurred in the 16th century in Florence, Italy around the same as voluminous clothing, such as ballooned sleeves, had become fashionable among the wealthy. Rather than simply laying a tablecloth flat on a table, starched linens were folded into large centerpieces, called "triumphs," that could depict a variety of real and mythical animals, natural elements and architectural forms. A popular gift wedding guests received during this time was a personally folded napkin that distinguished whether they were related to the bride or groom. In the mid-18th century, table setting practices were so specific that in Germany there were particular traditions on how to fold napkins, display figures at the table and arrange plates. During this golden age of napkin folding, there was a school in Nuremberg devoted entirely to this art and butlers had shelves of instructional books to keep up with the changes in the field. Napkin folding in the form of table sculptures began being replaced by porcelain decorations during the 18th century.

== Common napkin folds ==
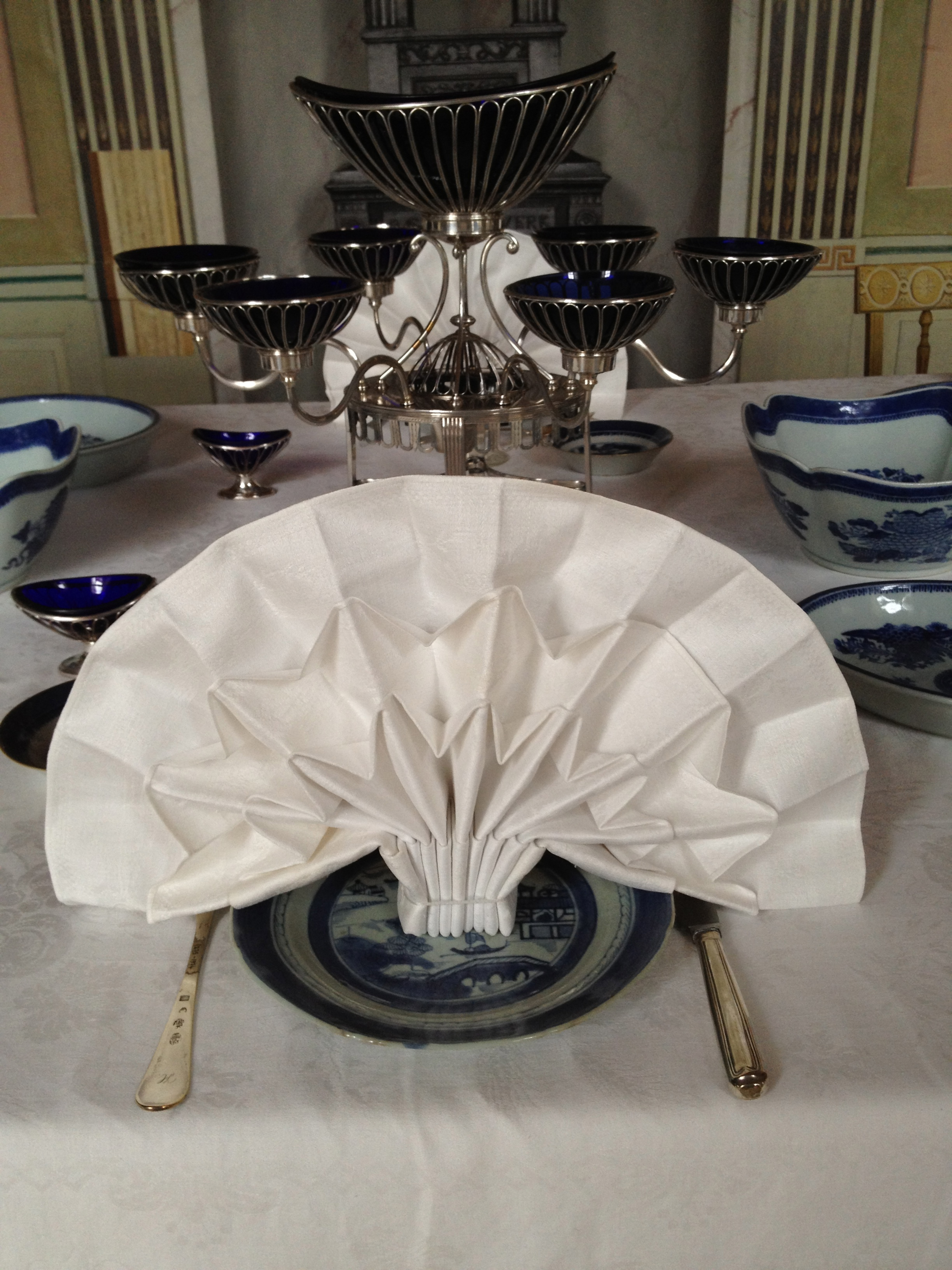
An example of a fan-style folded napkin

- Bishop's Hat
- Buffet fold (rectangular pocket)
- Candle
- Diagonal pocket
- Dress Shirt
- Envelope
- Fan
- Fleur-de-lis
- Iris
- Lotus (water lily)
- Rose

== See also ==
- Origami
- Table setting
- Tengkolok
