= Table setting =

Group of matched tableware or flatware for one diner

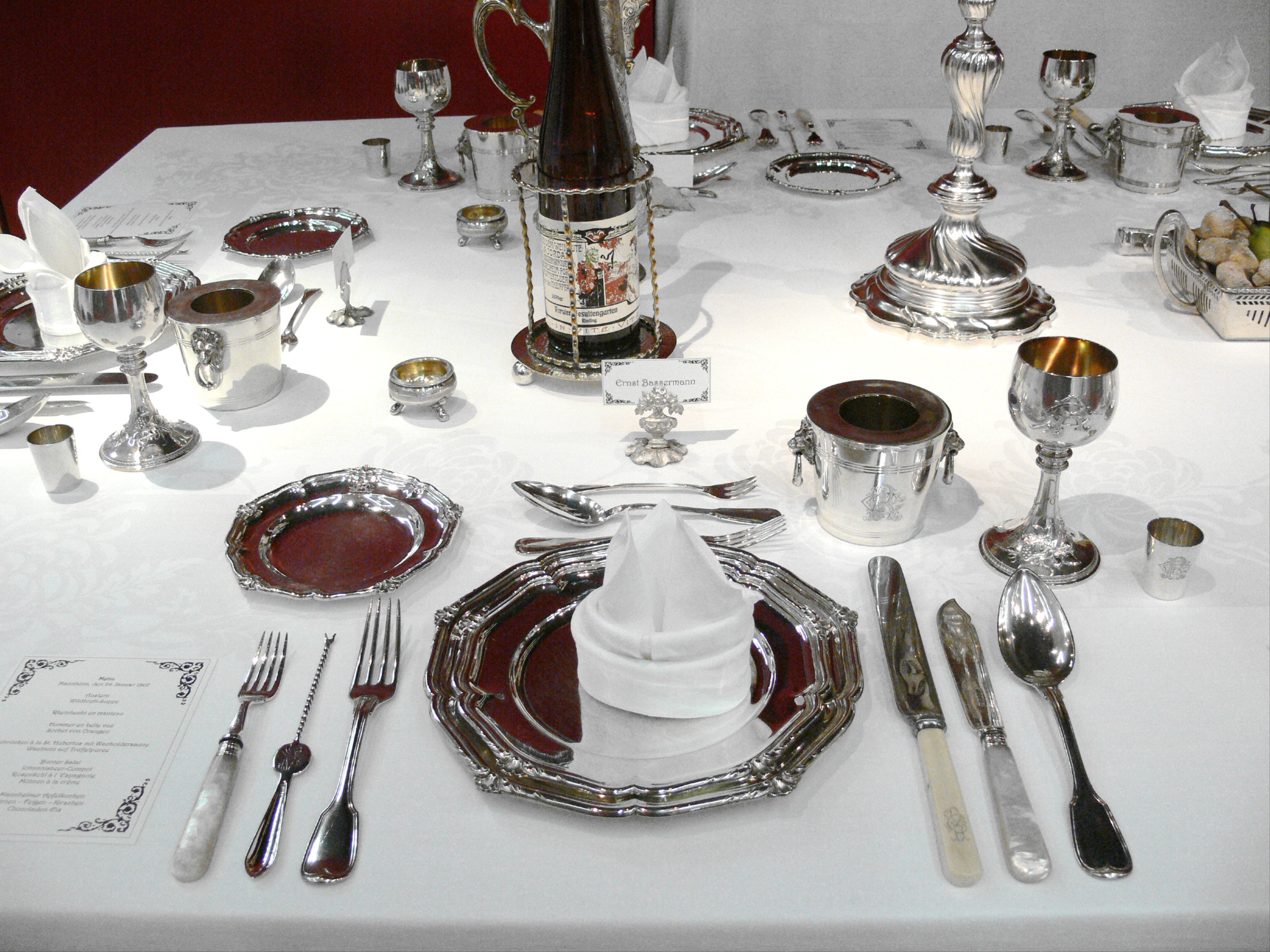
A table setting may have many elements, especially formal ones; the long utensil on the left side is a lobster pick.

Table setting (laying a table) or place setting refers to the way to set a table with tableware—such as eating utensils and for serving and eating. The arrangement for a single diner is called a place setting. It is also the layout in which the utensils and ornaments are positioned. The practice of dictating the precise arrangement of tableware has varied across cultures and historical periods.

== Place setting ==
Informal settings generally have fewer utensils and dishes but use a layout based on more formal settings. Utensils are arranged in the order and according to the manner in which the diner will use them. In the West, forks, plate, butter knife, and napkin generally are placed to the left of the dinner plate, and knives, spoons, stemware and tumblers, cups, and saucers to the right. (By contrast, formal settings in Armenia place the fork to the right of the dinner plate and informal settings in Turkey place the fork to the right of the dinner plate if not accompanied by a knife) Sauceboats and serving dishes, when used, either are placed on the table or, more formally, may be kept on a side table.

=== Informal ===
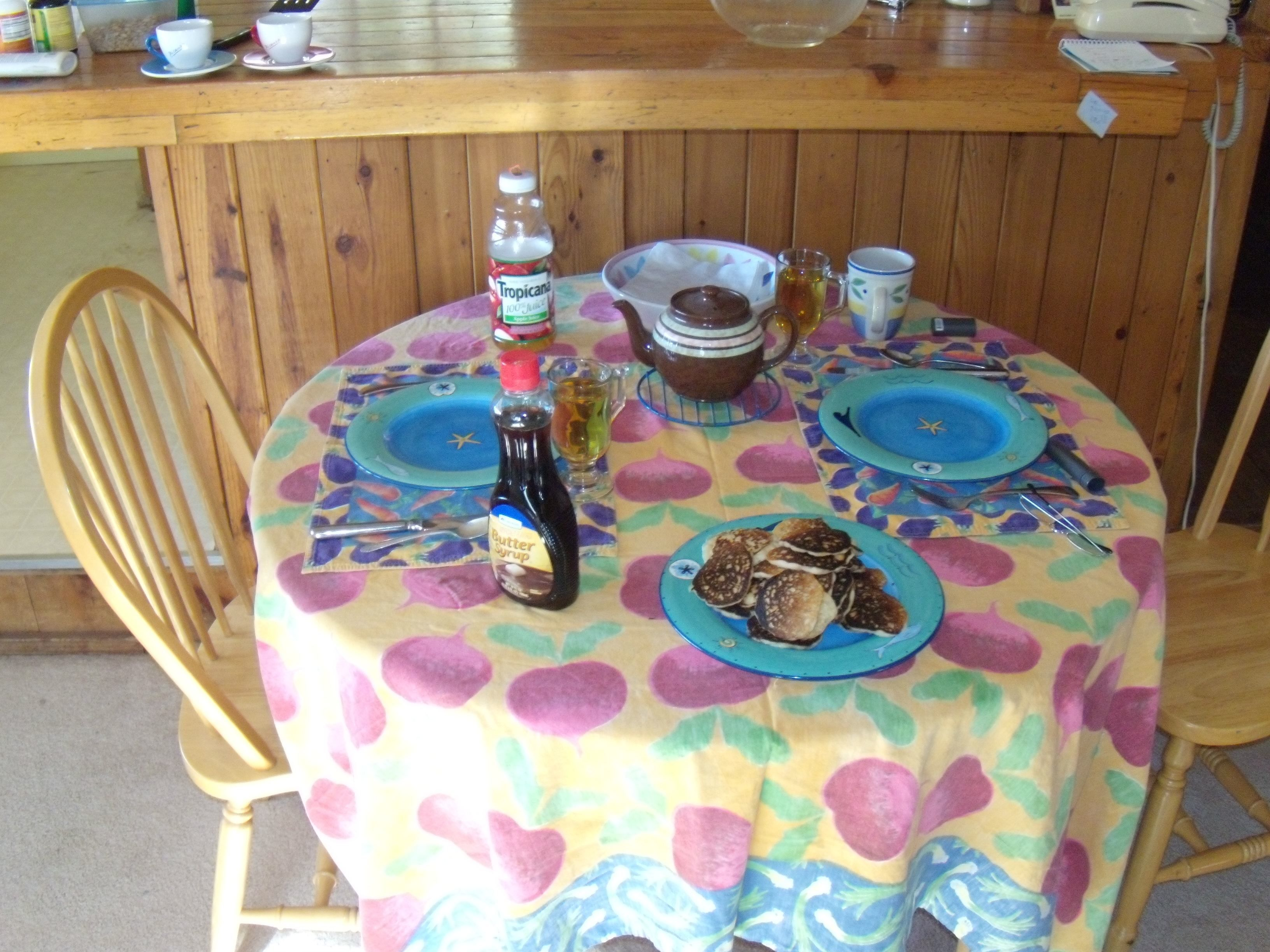
Informal setting with pancakes in a California mountain cabin

At an informal setting, fewer utensils are used and serving dishes are placed on the table. Sometimes the cup and saucer are placed on the right side of the spoon, about 30 cm or 12 inches from the edge of the table. Often, in less formal settings, the napkin should be in the wine glass. However, such objects as napkin rings are very rare in the United Kingdom, Spain, Mexico, or Italy.

=== Formal ===
Utensils are placed inward about 20 cm or 8 inches from the edge of the table, with all placed either upon the same invisible baseline or upon the same invisible median line. Utensils in the outermost position are to be used first (for example, a soup spoon or a salad fork, later the dinner fork and the dinner knife). The blades of the knives are turned toward the plate. Glasses are placed an inch (2.5 cm) or so above the knives, also in the order of use: white wine, red wine, dessert wine, and water tumbler.

=== Wedding ===
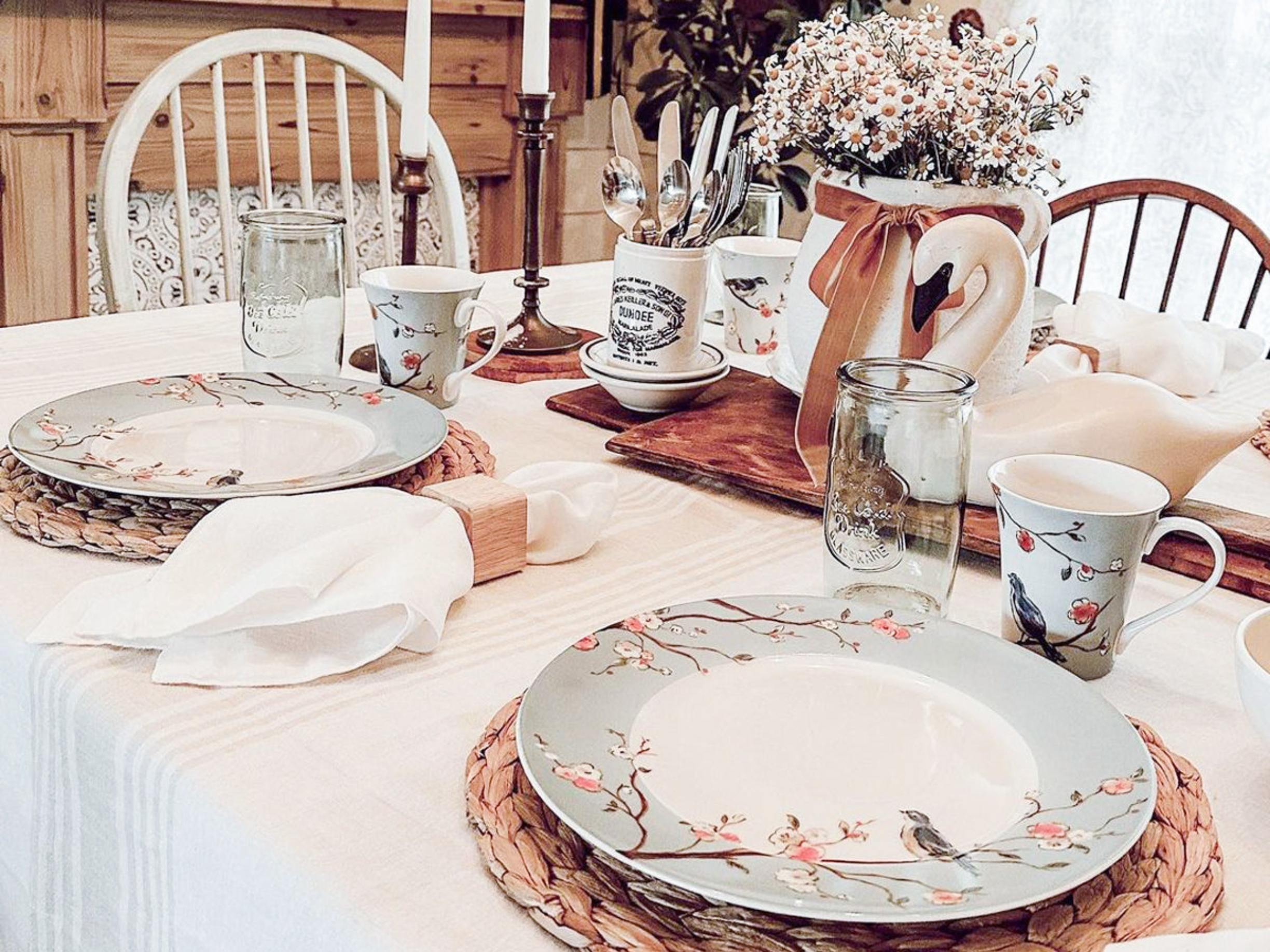
Rustic wedding table setting with floral accents

Wedding table setting typically combines formal dining conventions with decorative elements that reflect the couple’s theme and cultural traditions. Place settings often follow a formal or semi-formal arrangement, with utensils aligned evenly from the table edge, glassware arranged by order of use, and folded napkins placed either on the plate or beside it. Centerpieces such as floral arrangements, candles, or table numbers are commonly used, while chargers, coordinated linens, and personalized place cards add visual cohesion. The overall layout prioritizes symmetry, elegance, and guest comfort, while allowing flexibility based on regional customs, menu style, and the level of formality of the wedding.

==== Formal dinner ====
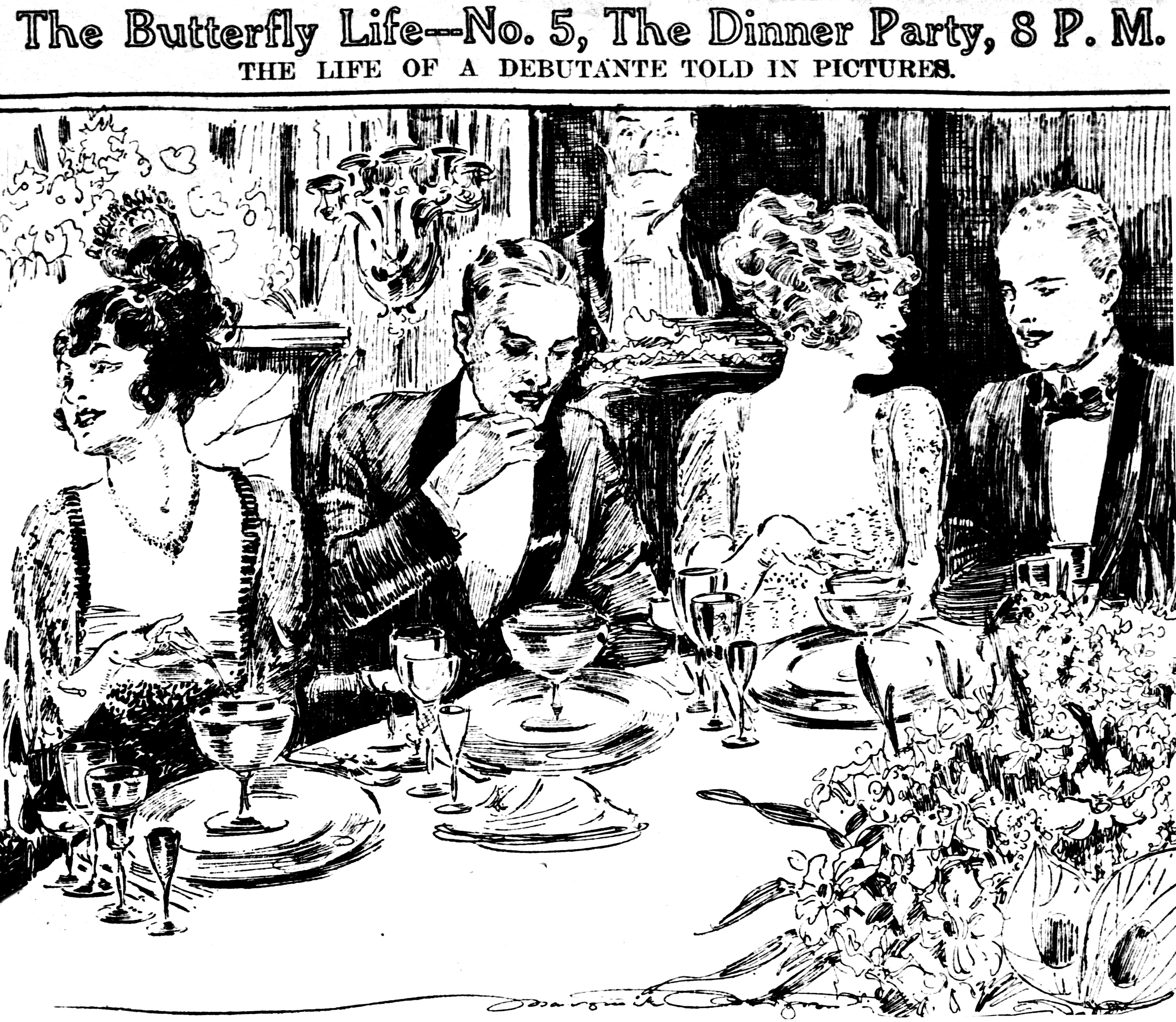
Place settings are conspicuous in this 1920 sketch by reporter-artist Marguerite Martyn of the St. Louis Post-Dispatch.

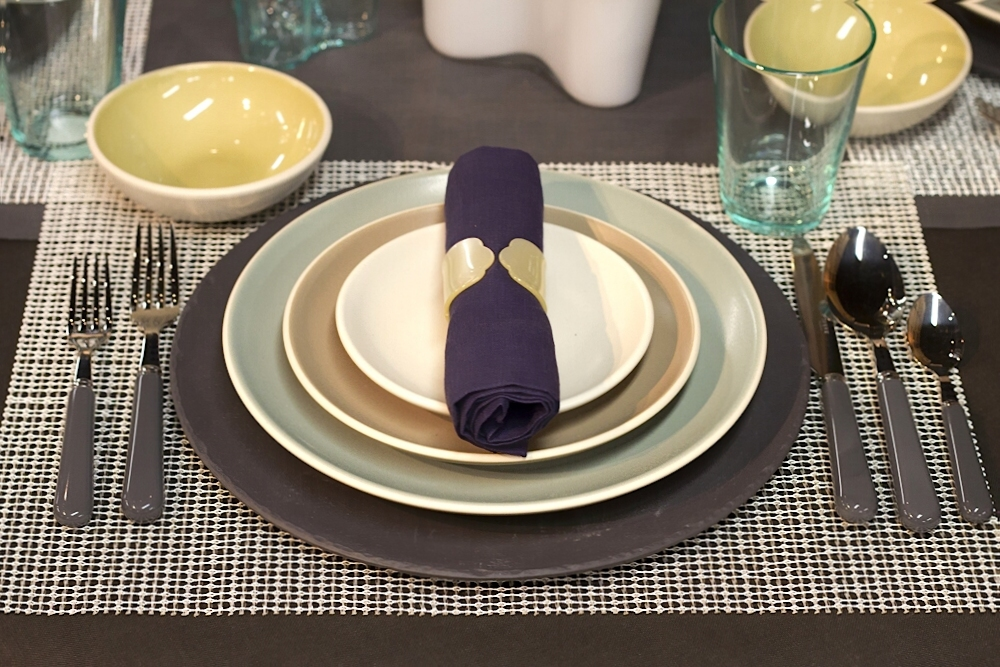
A typical lunch table setting.

The most formal dinner is served from the kitchen. When the meal is served, in addition to the central plate (a service plate or dinner plate at supper; at luncheon, a service plate or luncheon plate) at each place there is a bread roll (generally on a bread plate, sometimes in the napkin), napkin, and flatware (knives and spoons to the right of the central plate, and forks to the left). Coffee is served in Butler Service style in demitasses, and a spoon is placed on the saucer to the right of each handle. Serving dishes and utensils are not placed on the table for a formal dinner. The only exception in the West to these general rules is the protocol followed at the Spanish royal court, which was also adopted by the Austrian court, in which all cutlery was placed to the right of the central plate for each diner.

At a less formal dinner, not served from the kitchen, the dessert fork and spoon can be set above the plate, fork pointing right, spoon pointing left.

== See also ==
- Centrepiece
- Cutlery (US: Flatware)
- Haft-Sin, traditional table setting of Nowruz, the traditional Iranian spring celebration.
- List of glassware
- Napkin folding
- Silver service, a method of table service in the United Kingdom
- Tableware
