= Napkin ring cylinder =

A napkin ring cylinder is a format of phonograph cylinder manufactured and marketed by the Columbia Phonograph Company in 1904 and 1905. They were of standard diameter, but only measured 1.5 inches in length. Primarily they were marketed for home recordings, at one-third the price of a standard-length cylinder, to be placed in a "voice album", where family members or visitors to a home could leave a 30-second message, and a place was made on the container lid in which a photograph(s) of the individual(s) making the recording could be placed. As well, the napkin ring cylinders were generally used as a marketing tool at the 1904 St. Louis Exposition and the 1905 Lewis and Clark Centennial Exposition where visitors to Columbia's booth were given the opportunity to make, and be given, a record without charge. On occasion, a record made by an entertainer at the booth could be acquired instead. Surviving examples are very scarce.

Some of the very earliest wax cylinder records were also noted to have been similar in dimension to a napkin ring.
