= Household Service Demonstration Project =

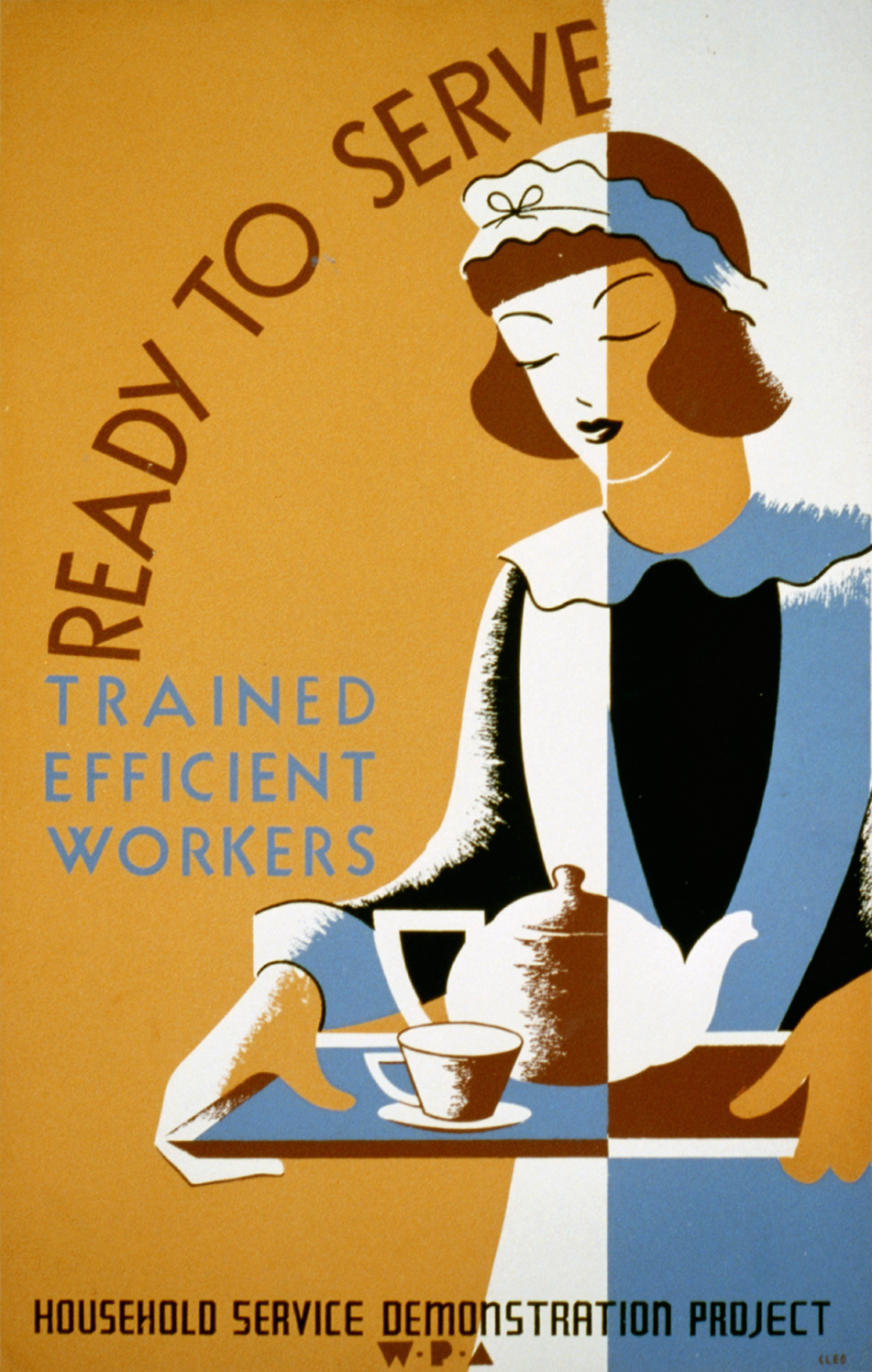
A poster advertising the Household Service Demonstration Project

The Household Service Demonstration Project (HSDP) was a Works Progress Administration (WPA) project designed to train women for domestic employment.

== History ==
The project was an offshoot of the Household Workers’ Training Program. The WPA announced the project in March 1937. It got under way around July 1937 and ended it in January 1942. The project was formally authorized by United States Congress in 1938. It offered training and employment in WPA training centers giving demonstrations of housework. The WPA designed it to promote the employment of women certified as qualified for private household employment and to promote the techniques of household service.

== Accomplishments ==
The project trained 30,000 women. Middle-aged women were preferred due to the perceived unreliability and increased risk of marriage of younger women. The project employed 1,700 women to give two- and three-month courses in cooking and serving food, house and child care, washing, ironing, and marketing. Other skills taught included table setting, home management, budgeting and knitting.

== The Program ==
In Washington, during the course of their training, trainees were paid $46 a month. After passing written and oral exams, diplomas were awarded to graduates. After completing training, a graduate could make $60 a month as a domestic.

== Locations ==
Demonstration sites were located at 400 South Capitol Street in Washington, DC, and at 217 E Boone Ave in Spokane, Washington.

== Assessments ==
The HSDP was called Eleanor Roosevelt’s favorite project. It was part of the WPA’s traditional emphasis. The assistant state supervisor of seven household service projects in Pennsylvania was reported as saying, "There is something so obvious about a woman working in a home that I wonder why a project such as this wasn't begun many years ago."
