= Honeymoon suite (hotel) =

Hotel room type

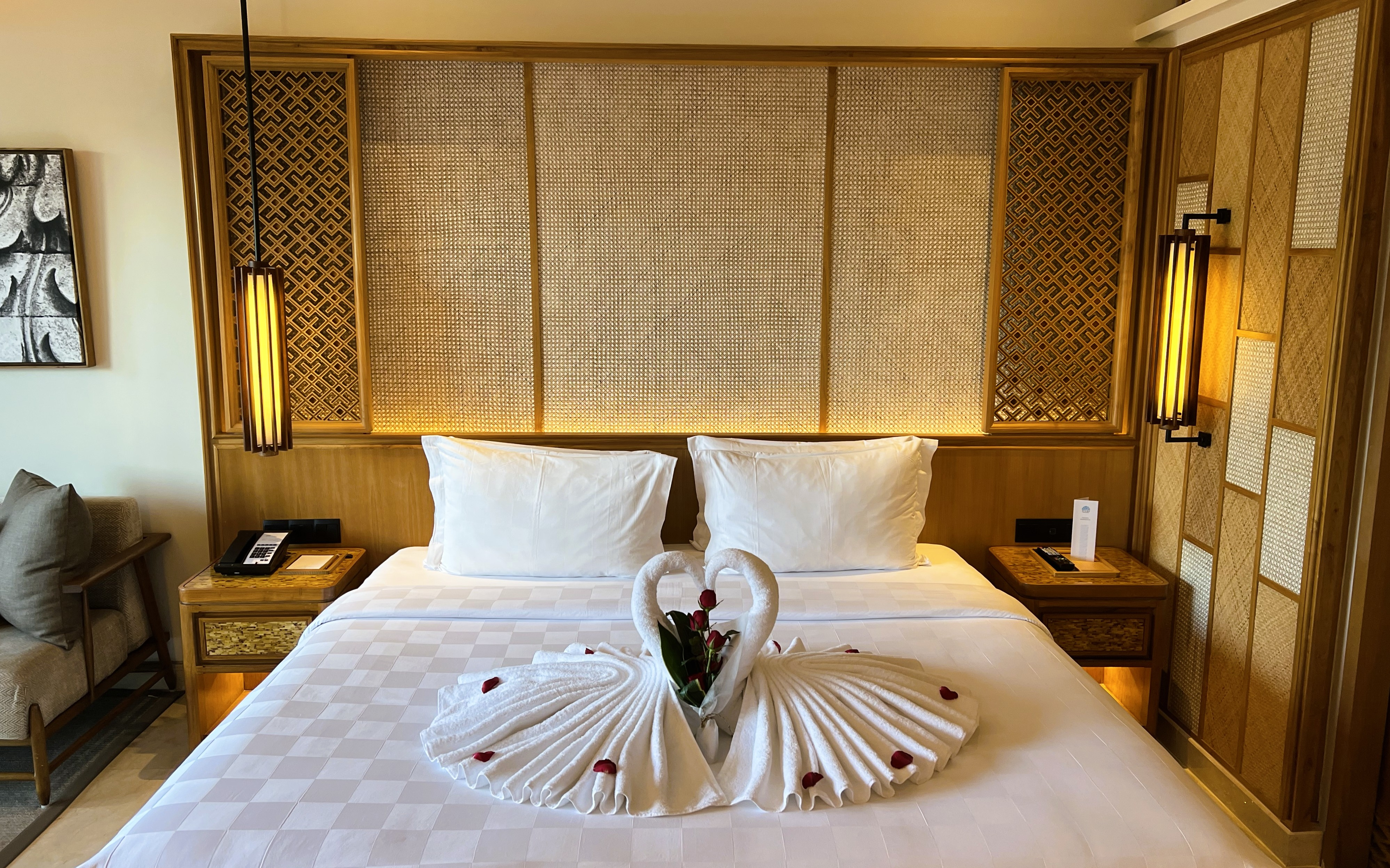
A honeymoon suite at a resort, with towel animals on the bed

A honeymoon suite, or a 'romance suite', in a hotel or other places of accommodation denotes a suite with special amenities primarily aimed at couples and newlyweds.

It is a form of niche marketing that likely originated during the 1920s with Niagara Falls providing small huts for couples to stay in near its site as a form of promotion. In The Second Greatest Disappointment: Honeymooning and Tourism at Niagara Falls, author Karen Dubinsky refers to one campground owner in particular who named his cabins "honeymoon huts". However, there were no mentions of "honeymoon suites" in any advertorial literature at Niagara. According to Dubinsky, such targeted promotions towards honeymooners began only in the 1930 and 1940s, further increasing post the Second World War. In the early 1930s, the Toronto-Niagara and New York City-Niagara railway routes were dubbed as "Honeymoon Special".

== See also ==
- Presidential suite
