= Napkin holder =

Device used to hold napkins

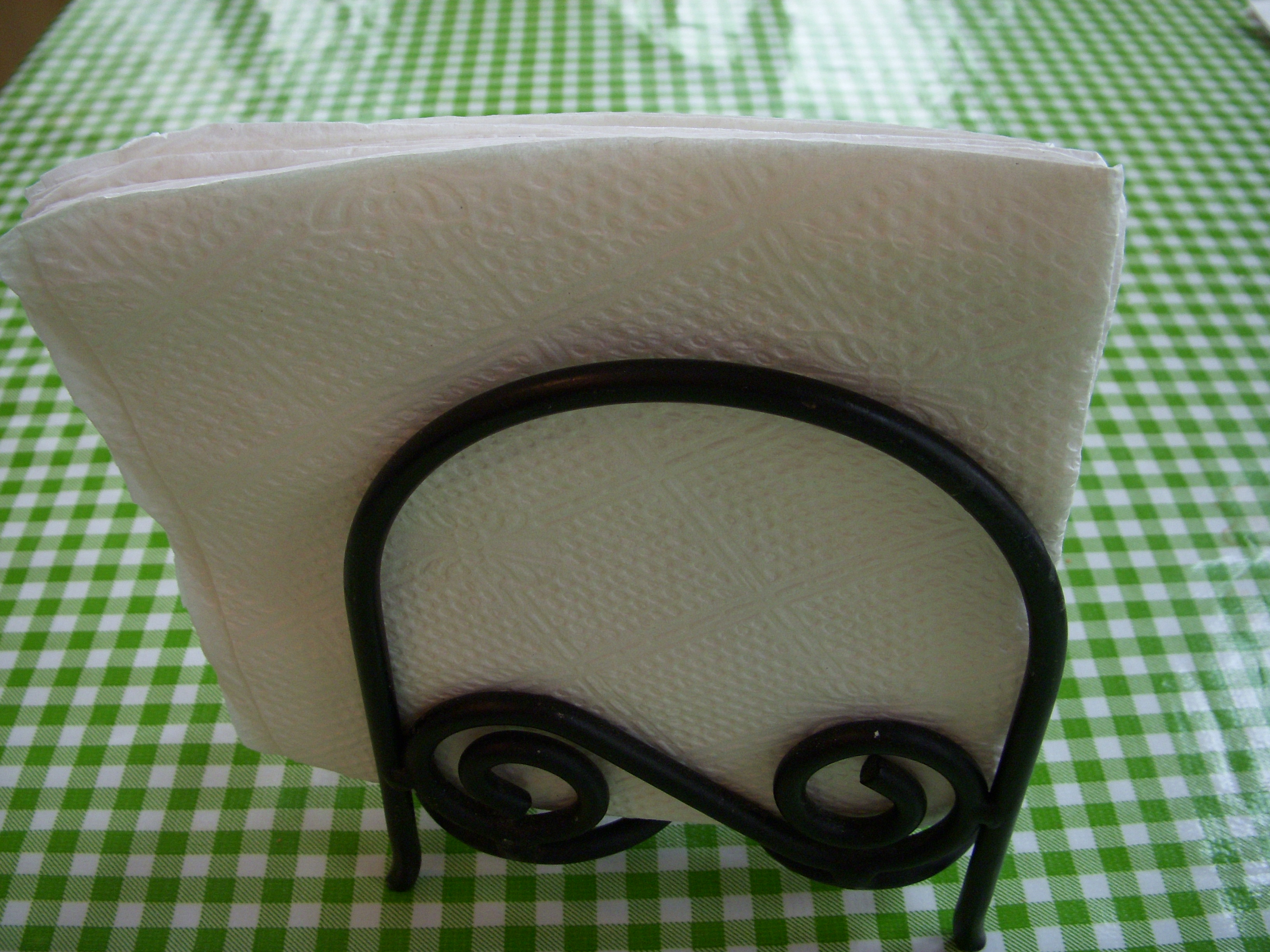
- A typical upright napkin holder
- Classification: Kitchenware
- Types: Vertical, horizontal Plastic, metal.
- Used with: Napkins
- Related: Napkin ring, napkin dispenser

A napkin holder is a device used to hold napkins. A napkin holder can be made from virtually any solid material and is built so that the napkins do not slip from its hold, either by way of sandwiching them between two surfaces, or simply enclosing them on their sides in a horizontal design. Napkin holders range in price and styles from wooden designs to wrought iron or ceramic styles and many others. One iteration of the napkin holder, better known as a napkin dispenser, offers additional functionality with its design: folded napkins are enclosed in a snug metal casing, allowing users to retrieve a single napkin each time they reach into the container; this particular device is usually found in restaurants, diners, and other public eateries, while its simpler—often more aesthetically pleasing—counterpart, the holder, is common to households and classrooms. There is also an item which holds a napkin or serviette in a button hole or the top of a conventional necktie knot. It is conjectured as a clamp for the corner of a napkin and an hook which hooks into the top of the tie knot. They are most usually in sterling silver and date back to at least Edwardian times. Hence often to be found in antique outlets as functional collector's items. Certain "gentleman's clubs" include a button hole in a corner of their napkins for direct coupling to an upper shirt button.

== Function ==
The outward pressure from a full load of napkins helps keep them between the two outer walls of the holder.

Napkin holders, as their name implies, are tools in which napkins are held and stored, most often sandwiched between two surfaces. Among basic holders, there are several kinds, those principally belonging in two categories; vertical and horizontal. While their main function is to hold napkins, napkin holders can also serve to complement decorations, either internally or externally. In addition, the creation of napkin holders by amateur woodworkers and metalworkers serves as a fairly easy project, and has been touted by do it yourself magazines such as Popular Mechanics and Popular Science. Even simpler designs have been sold as projects that children can do, the napkin holders in these being made of paper plates and yarn.

Napkin holders are used in many locations, ranging from classrooms to eateries.

== History ==
The popularity of napkin holders corresponded with the invention (and popularization) of the paper napkin by the Scott Paper Company in 1930, although cloth napkins had existed—often as handkerchiefs—since Greek and Roman times. Wrought iron napkin holders and rings were a common part of a blacksmith's repertoire during the 19th century as well as other holders and household items. Mechanically made napkin holders have replaced many of those made by hand, as blacksmithing is now primarily an art form, as opposed to a means of creation of household utility items.

=== Vintage napkin holders ===
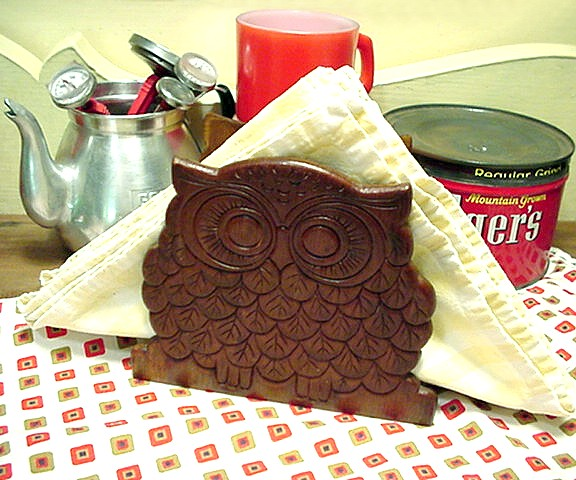
A non-plastic vintage napkin holder, with the design of an owl

Vintage napkin holders were an integral part of kitchens during the 1950s, 1960s, and 1970s. Made in large quantities, these napkin holders were often made of brightly colored plastic, either transparent or solid. Other non-plastic napkin holders were also produced, but in smaller quantities.

== Design ==
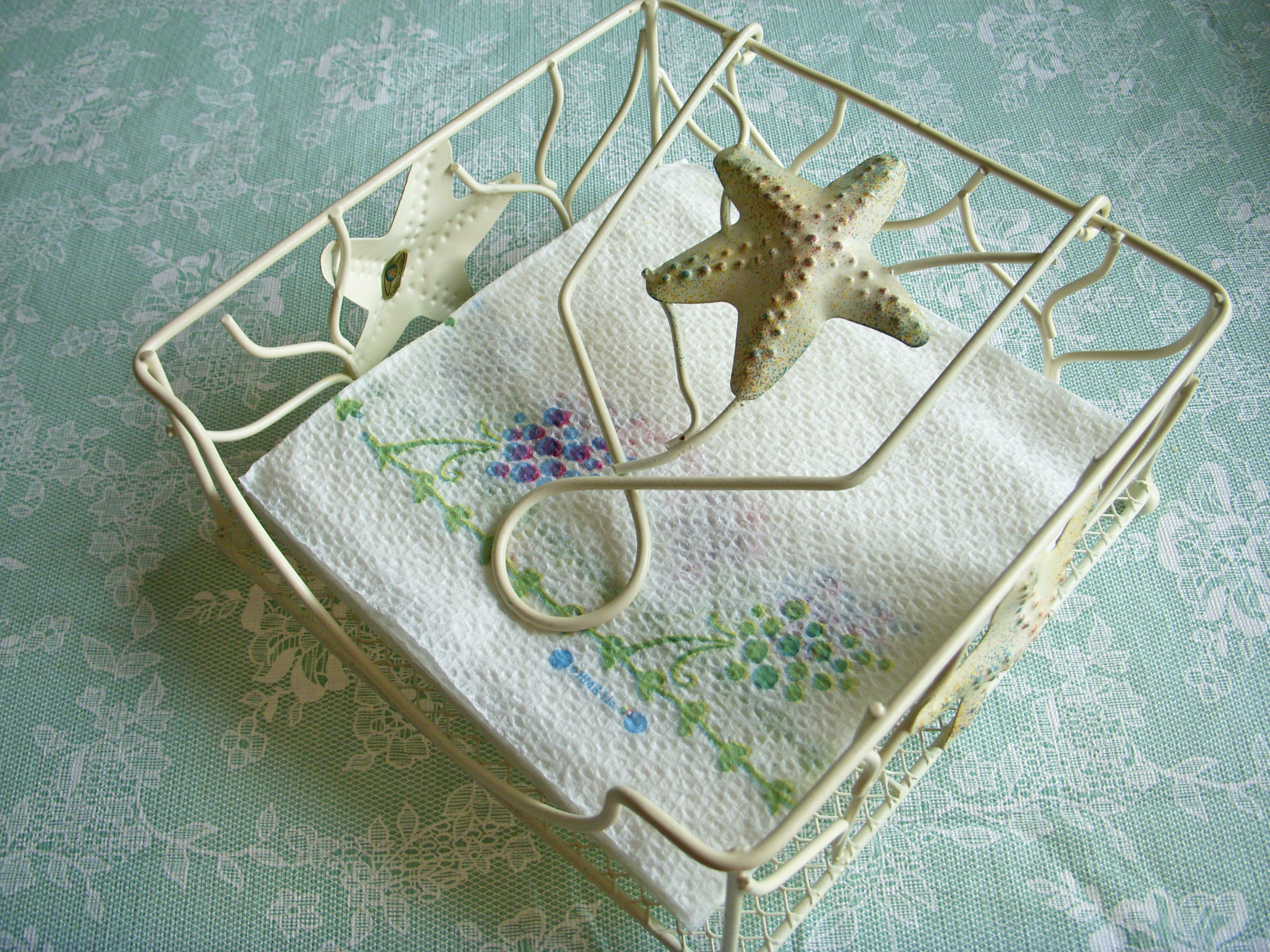
A horizontal napkin holder with a weight to hold napkins down and edges

The two main styles of napkin holders, vertical and horizontal, function in similar ways. Vertical napkin holders and some horizontal napkin holders sandwich napkins between two surfaces. In vertical napkin holders, the surfaces tend to be the same size and, often, shape, making the napkin holders symmetrical. In vertical holders that sandwich, however, the bottom is usually around the size of a conventional paper napkin, about 7.25 inches (184 mm) by 7.75 inches (197 mm) while the top side can be any virtually any shape, as it acts as a paperweight. Within this style, there is variation. Some napkin holders have edges as the weight alone could not keep the napkins down (see photo), while others rely entirely on their weight to secure the napkins. Another type of horizontal holder lacks a weight altogether, and is simply a base and four edges.

The design of napkin holders is largely based upon preconditions of the space or spaces that the napkin holder will occupy. For example, if limited table space is available, a vertical design may be more practical. However, if conserving space is not an issue, a horizontal napkin holder is advantageous, as well as slightly easier for the subject to access. Color, style, and durability are also based on the environment and the architectural styles of the selected room or rooms. Lastly, price and budget are determining factors of a napkin holder's design, which usually range between 10 and 50 US dollars.

== Construction ==
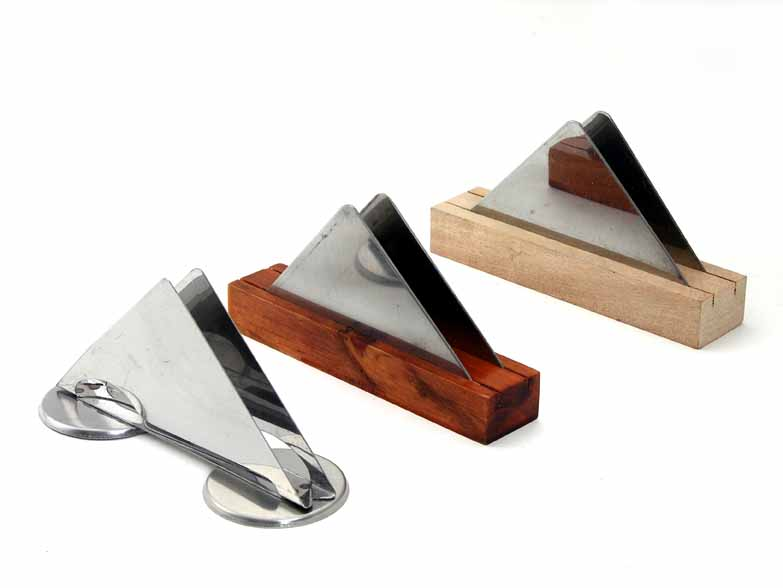
Metal and combination metal/wood napkin holders

While the basic design of napkin holders is consistent, the tools and construction materials will vary based on what material the maker is using.

=== Wood ===
While less common than metal or wrought iron napkin holders, wooden napkin holders are often made as art projects, due to the relative ease of making them, and easy access to the materials needed. Common materials used in wooden napkin holder construction include:

- Hardwood or plywood for extra strength and durability.
- Brad nails.
- Wood glue.

=== Metal ===
Metal napkin holders may be made from wrought iron, wire, or sheet metal.

== Napkin dispensers ==
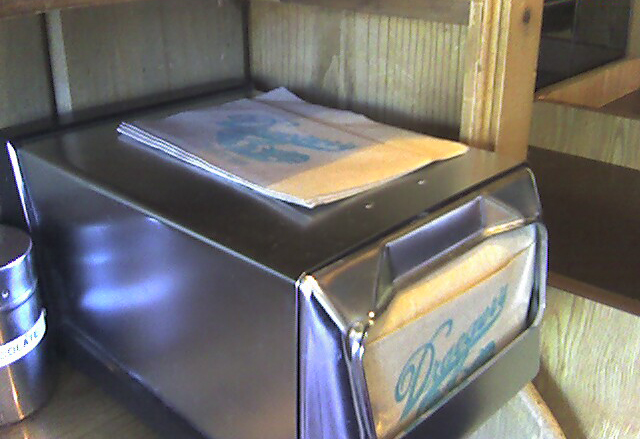
A wide napkin dispenser

A variant of the napkin holder, the napkin dispenser, was invented by Charles H. Coons in 1928. Napkin dispensers are usually seen in restaurants and diners, not only because they are easy to access, but more importantly because they provide diners with autonomy from the restaurant staff. Hence if a spill or other accident occurs requiring multiple napkins, the diners can clean it up on their own, which frees the burden from waiters and other staff members.

== See also ==
- Napkin ring
- Napkin
- Wrought iron
