= Presidential suite =

Hotel room type

Presidential suite and royal suite are common names for the most expensive suite in a luxury hotel.

The presidential suite gained its name during the Woodrow Wilson presidency (1913–1921) because on each of his political trips away from Washington, he would insist on having a hotel room conform to specific requirements for his visit. In the United States, presidential suites since have adhered by tradition to Woodrow Wilson's specifications. It must be south-facing in the Northern Hemisphere and north-facing in the Southern Hemisphere, containing an "en-suite" bathroom and walk-in closet (in Wilson's era en-suite bathrooms were uncommon). Famous presidential suites can be found in the Plaza Hotel in New York City, and the Fairmont San Francisco. According to Vogue, some of the most known presidential suites in the United States are in The Jefferson in Washington, D.C., The Charles Hotel in Massachusetts, The Brown Palace Hotel and Spa in Denver, Waldorf Astoria New York, Cheeca Lodge & Spa in Florida, and Hay-Adams Hotel.

Royal suites can often signify that royalty have stayed at that suite in the past. Royal suites are more common in hotels in countries with monarchies, such as the Ritz Hotel London.

A very small number of hotels have both a presidential and a royal suite. In these instances, usually both suites are of a comparable size and price, but differ in style and facilities. Royal suites may be more classically furnished, while presidential suites may be more modern in appearance. Presidential suites may have facilities such as a private conference room, while royal suites may have a formal reception room instead.

People sometimes reside in these suites on a permanent basis, such as wealthy families that enjoy this type of suite in a semi-private manner for special rates.

== See also ==
- State room, referring to rooms reserved for the head of state in large mansions
- Honeymoon suite (hotel)
