= Suite (hotel) =

Multi-room hotel accommodation

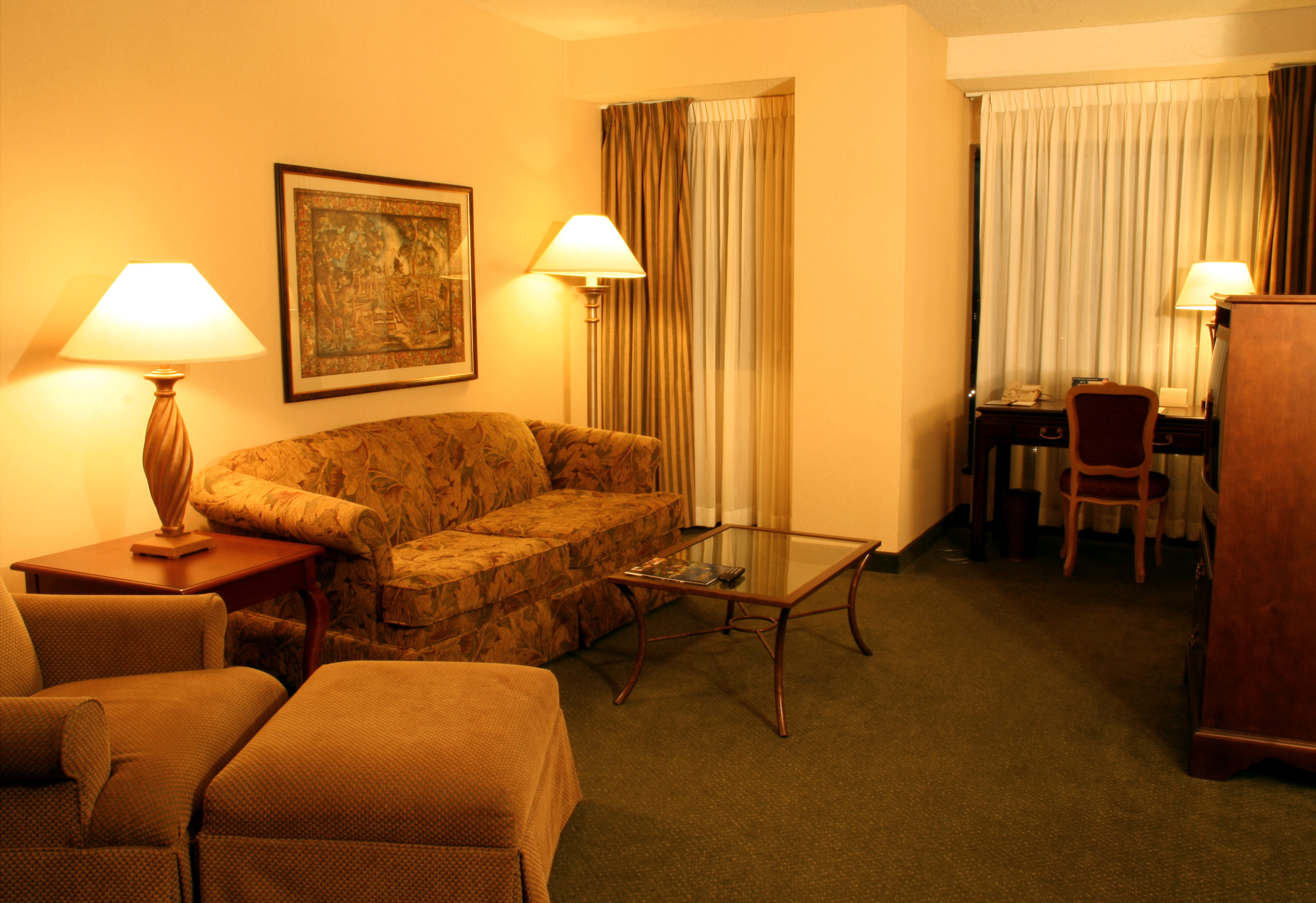
Living room in a hotel suite at the DoubleTree Hotel in Columbus, Ohio

A suite in a hotel or other public accommodation (e.g. a cruise ship) denotes, according to most if not all dictionary definitions, connected rooms under one room number. Hotels may refer to suites as a class of accommodations with more space than a standard hotel room, but strictly speaking there should be more than one room to constitute a suite.

In luxury or upscale accommodations, such as Ritz Carlton, InterContinental, Marriott, Westin, Four Seasons, Shangri-La or St. Regis, suites will comprise multiple rooms. Many independent properties have one or more honeymoon suites. The most luxurious accommodation in a hotel is often called the presidential suite or royal suite.

Upper-midscale accommodations, such as Comfort Inn & Suites, Hampton Inn & Suites, and Candlewood Suites, may denote suites as one room with more space and furniture than a standard hotel room, and so technically these would not be considered suites of rooms per se. In addition to one or more beds and a bathroom, such attribution "suites" include a living or sitting area, often equipped with a sofa bed. Dining, office and kitchen facilities are also added in many of these "suites." Some chains, such as Staybridge Suites and Home2 Suites by Hilton, offer only suites, which often cater to business travelers.

== Bridal and honeymoon suites ==
As a form of niche marketing, hôteliers may offer premium rooms with specialized amenities aimed at couples or newlyweds. The presence of special "honeymoon suites" or "romance suites" marketed to couples, newlyweds or "second honeymooners" is widespread, appearing not only in hotel/motel or resort accommodation, but also aboard cruise ships.

While Niagara Falls had branded itself "the honeymoon capital of the world" as early as the railway era of the late 1800s, its first tentative promotion of campground "honeymoon huts" dates to the 1920s. The "honeymoon suite" pattern of multiple destinations offering bridal suites with heart-shaped tubs is a more modern one, which grew in the post-World War II era of airplanes and motorcar travel.

== See also ==
- Hotel
- Motel
- Resort
- Tourism
