= Hotel toilet paper folding =

Signal that a bathroom has been cleaned

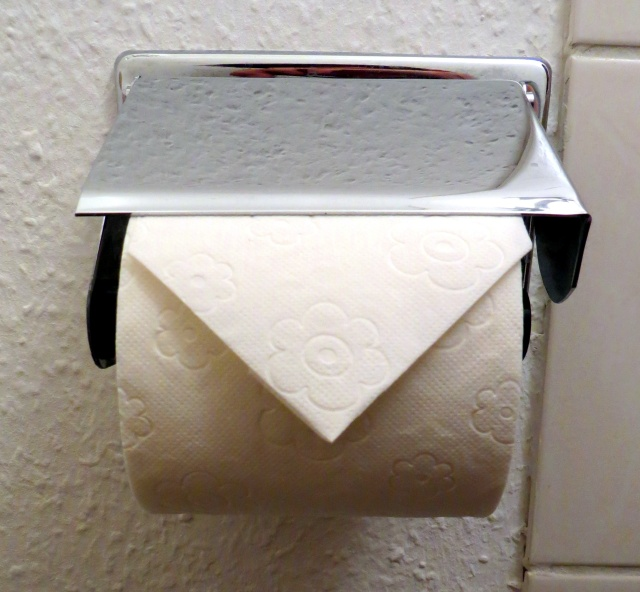
Toilet paper with folding

Hotel toilet paper folding is a common practice performed by hotels worldwide as a way of assuring guests that the bathroom has been cleaned.

The common fold normally involves creating a triangle or "V" shape out of the first available sheet or square on a toilet paper roll. Commonly, the two corners of that sheet are tucked behind the paper symmetrically, forming a point at the end of the roll. More elaborate folding results in shapes like fans, sailboats, and even flowers.

Toilet paper folding is also known as "toilet paper origami" or "toilegami". The practice has been considered an emblematic example of a meme copied across the world from a hotel to another, until it became common.

== Extent ==
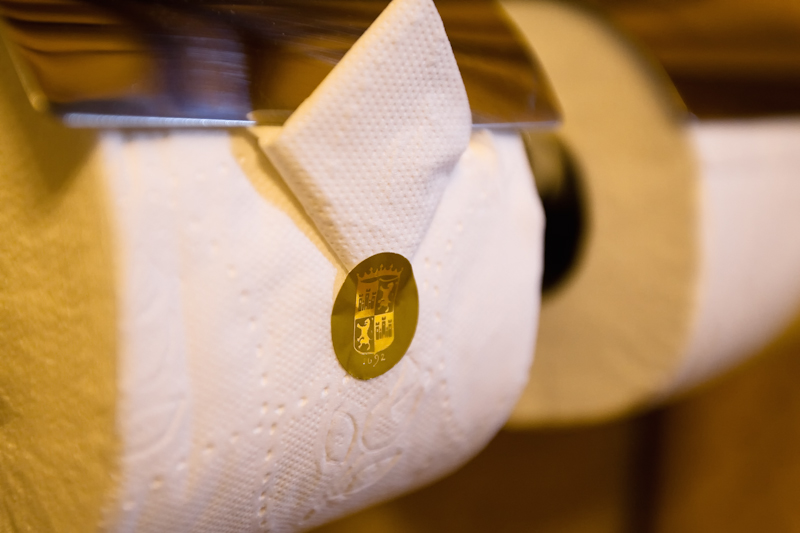
Folded and sealed toilet paper with cover, Hotel Monasterio 2009

The practice is followed by hotels all over the world, according to Stephen Gill, a British photographer who published a book of pictures of folded hotel toilet paper from various nations.

Dr. Susan Blackmore, who uses the example of hotel toilet paper folding to illustrate the use of memes, pointed out in the 2006 Darwin Day Lecture before the British Humanist Association that even a remote guesthouse she visited in rural Assam in India folded the first sheet on its rolls of toilet paper.

Hotel toilet paper folding is such an institution that in the horror movie 1408 it is used as one of the eerie happenings noticed by the main character—after using the toilet paper, he finds it mysteriously has been freshly folded over when no one else had been in the room.

== Reasons ==
According to David Feldman, in his "Imponderables" syndicated newspaper column, the practice is meant to assure customers that their hotel room has been cleaned. Feldman reported that he had contacted many of the country's largest innkeeper chains to ask why the toilet paper was folded, and all of them provided the same answer. He quoted James P. McCauley, executive director of the International Association of Holiday Inns:

Hotels want to give their guests the confidence that the bathroom has been cleaned since the last guest has used the room. To accomplish this, the maid will fold over the last piece of toilet paper to assure that no one has used the toilet paper since the room was cleaned. It is subtle but effective.

Stephen Gill believes the practice is meant to please or impress customers:

But the neatly made bed, the folded toilet paper—all these things symbolise attention and love. Perhaps such finishing touches are also an attempt to suggest flawlessness or excellence, and so distract you from whatever failings the room may have. They create a moment of stillness.

== Other uses ==
=== Variations ===
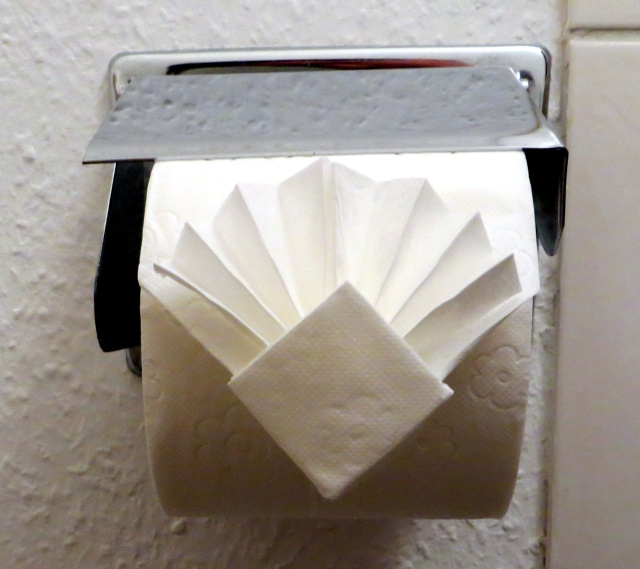
Toilegami

"Toilet paper origami" (also called "toilegami") is a variation that involves folding toilet paper in elaborate shapes.

Gill found differences in the style and care of folding between hotels. One example from Tokyo, "with its tiny pleats, really stands out", according to the photographer. "Only in Japan did I find such minute attention to detail. [...] The New York City [example], on the other hand, is very poor quality, asymmetrical on rough, thin paper. And the Romania [example] is a great slab with a small, right-hand fold."

According to one hotel industry website, "Housekeepers at luxe lairs around the world are neatly folding the loose end of a partially used roll of toilet paper into a neat little bow or fan." Some hotels provide more elaborate flourishes: some apply a sticker attaching the folded end to the roll; others wrap spare rolls with a ribbon; Thompson Hotels imprint their logo on the first square. The Eldorado Hotel in Santa Fe, New Mexico, also imprints its name and logo on the ends of its toilet paper — a practice done by supervisors checking the work of the housekeepers.

As part of a $1 billion renovation of the Fontainebleau Hotel in Miami Beach, Florida, in 2006, the typical triangular fold practice was stopped as one of a number of changes in order to give customers an impression that the hotel was special. "We're not going to do the little pointy thing," rooms division chief Charlotte Rosenau told the Miami Herald. "Every hotel does that." The change in toilet paper policy was made after Rosenau and several housekeepers crowded into a bathroom to experiment with different methods. They settled on "folding the first square in half, then resting the crease midway down the roll", according to the newspaper. "It just looks nice and clean," Rosenau explained.

The Tickle Pink Inn, a hotel in Carmel Highlands, California, folds the ends of its toilet paper into fan-like designs, mirroring the folds of its bathroom washcloths. A review in the San Francisco Chronicle noted the practice as "a fancy touch".

One travel writer noted seeing toilet paper folded into flowers and sailboats at hotels in Costa Rica.

=== Usage beyond hotels ===
An automated toilet paper folding machine called Mervoi (メルボア) was invented in Japan. With the push of a lever the device folds the first sheet of toilet paper into a triangle.

Elaborate wedding dresses have been made from folded toilet paper (also using glue).

== See also ==
- Decorative folding
- Toilet paper orientation
- Towel animal
