= Towel animal =

Depiction of animal made using towels

A towel animal is a depiction of an animal created by folding small towels. It is conceptually similar to origami, but uses towels rather than paper. Some common towel animals are elephants, snakes, rabbits and swans.

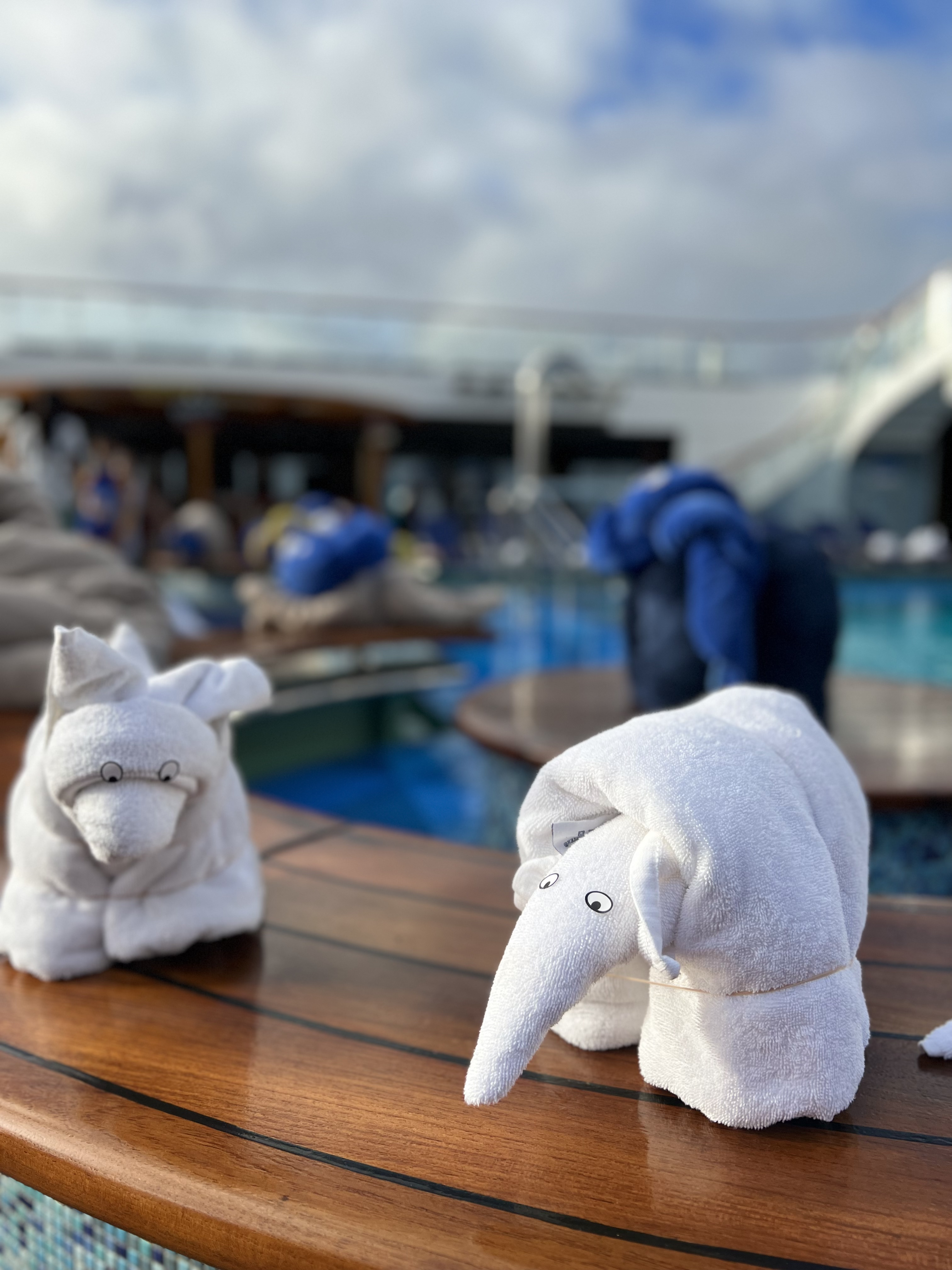
Elephant and dog towel animals by the pool on the Carnival Conquest.

Carnival, Norwegian Cruise Lines, Disney Cruise Line, Royal Caribbean, Disney Hotels and Holland America Line cruises will often place towel animals on a patron's bed as part of their nightly turndown service. Towel animals are also appearing in higher-end hotels and resorts such as Grupo Vidanta's Grand Luxxe Residence Clubs in Nuevo Vallarta and Riviera Maya.

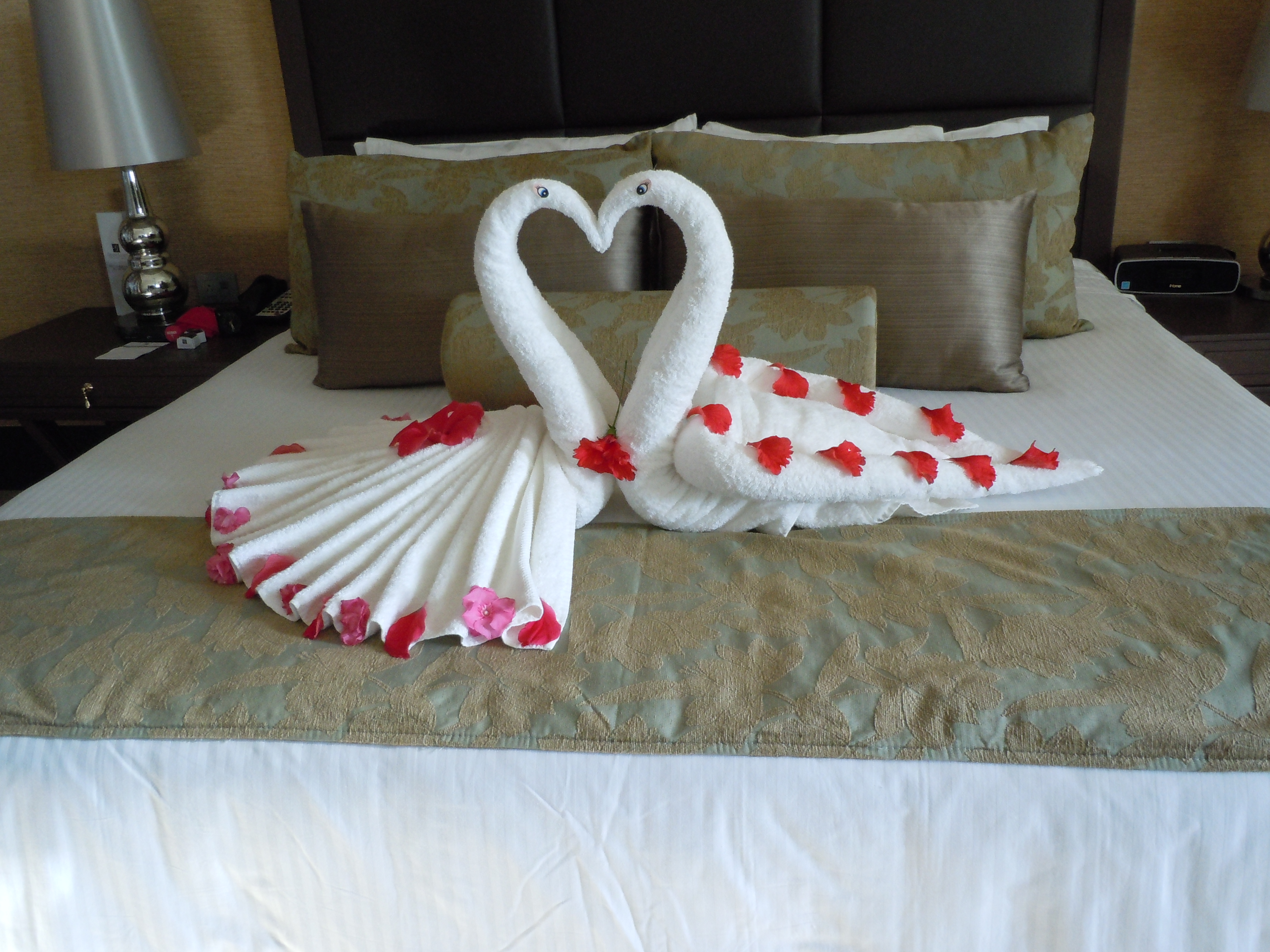
Peacock and peahen towel animals with flowers

== History ==
The exact originator of towel animals is unknown, but their popularity is often attributed to Carnival Cruise Lines. Carnival debuted its first towel animal in 1991. The ancestors of the towel animals are perhaps handkerchief animals or napkin folds.

== Equipment and training ==
The equipment consists of a bath towel and optional accessories to enhance the features. Various items can be used to accessorize the towel animals such as glasses, buttons for eyes, wiggle eyes, or safety pins for a nose. It is also quite common to use rubber bands to assist in maintaining the towel shape. Some creations require the use of multiple towels and at times, hand towels or washcloths. The Grand Luxxe uses flowers or flower petals and the tips of palm branches to enhance some of their creations such as the image picturing a peacock and peahen. Carnival ship attendants receive over 10 hours of training in towel animal creation.

== Publications ==
Carnival published a how to book on creating 40 different towel animal configurations. The most recent edition was published in 2011. The publication can be found on Carnival ships and Amazon.

Carnival offers their guests a book by pre-ordering before the cruise, or on board ship in the Formalities shop. Holland America makes a similar offer. There are several other books available on the subject.

== Environmental practices ==
=== Cruise lines ===
In 2019, Norwegian Cruise Line said that it was reducing the automatic provision of towel animals on some ships as part of an environmental and sustainability initiative. According to reports at the time, the policy was being tested on some ships rather than introduced across the entire fleet, and guests could still request towel animals from housekeeping.

Contemporary coverage said that the change was intended to reduce unnecessary laundry loads and conserve resources, since towels used for decorative displays still had to be washed even when unused by passengers. Reports also noted that Carnival Cruise Line and Royal Caribbean were not adopting a similar policy at that time.

== See also ==
- Decorative folding
- Hotel toilet paper folding
