= Napkin =

Absorbent cloth or paper for spills and wiping

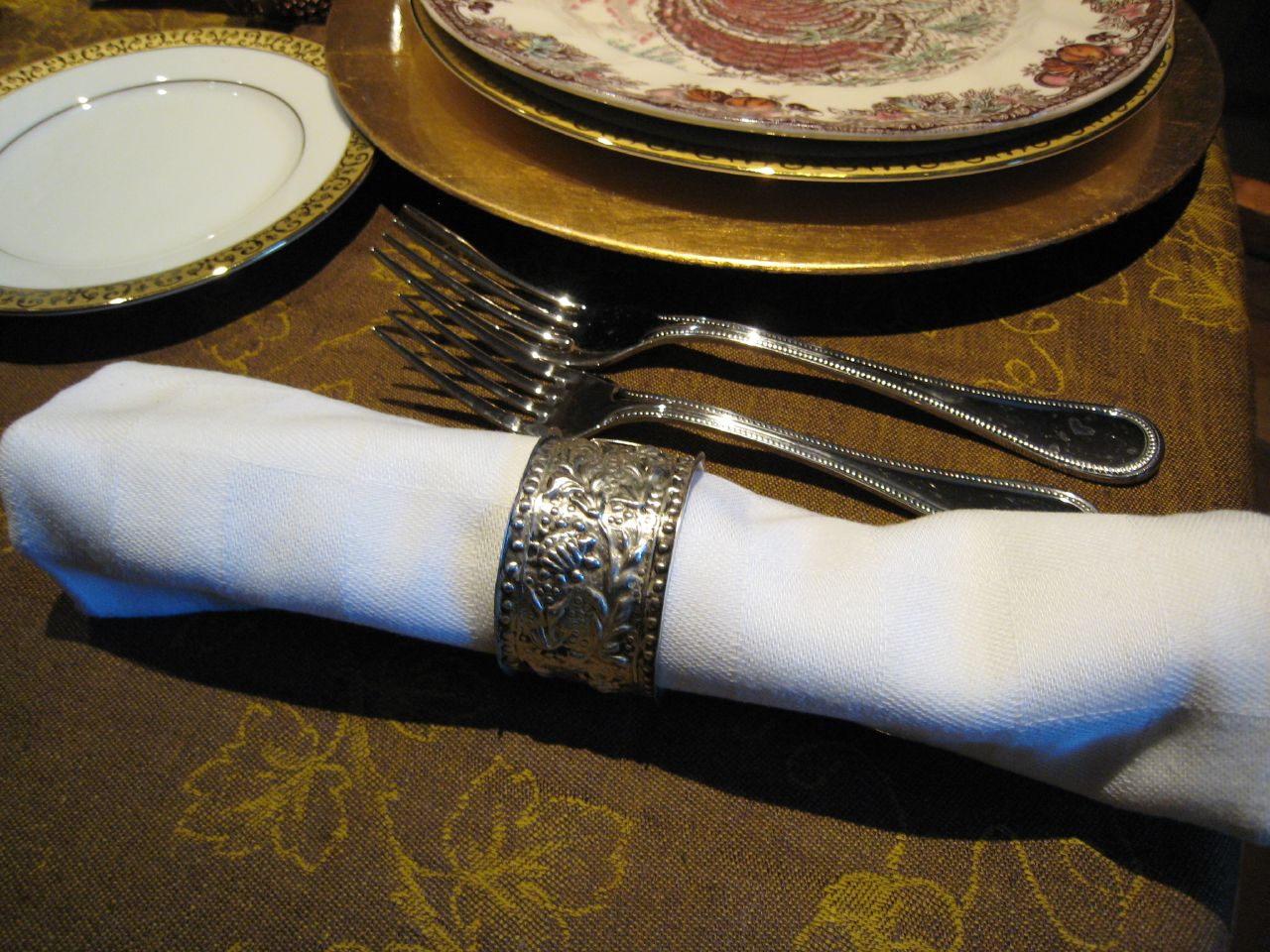
A rolled napkin inside of a napkin ring.

A disposable paper napkin on the tray at a cafeteria in Russia

A napkin, serviette or face towelette is a square of cloth or paper tissue used at the table for wiping of the mouth and fingers while eating. It is also sometimes used as a bib by tucking it into a shirt collar. It is usually small and folded, sometimes in intricate designs, colors, and shapes.

== Etymology and terminology ==
The term 'napkin' dates back to the 14th century, referring to a cloth or paper item used during meals for wiping of the lips and fingers, additionally safeguarding clothing from collecting stains. The word derives from the Late Middle English nappekin, from Old French nappe (tablecloth, from Latin mappa), with the suffix -kin.

A 'napkin' can also be referred to as a small cloth or towel, such as a handkerchief in dialectal British, or a kerchief in Scotland.

'Napkin' could also be an abbreviation for "sanitary napkin".

== Description ==
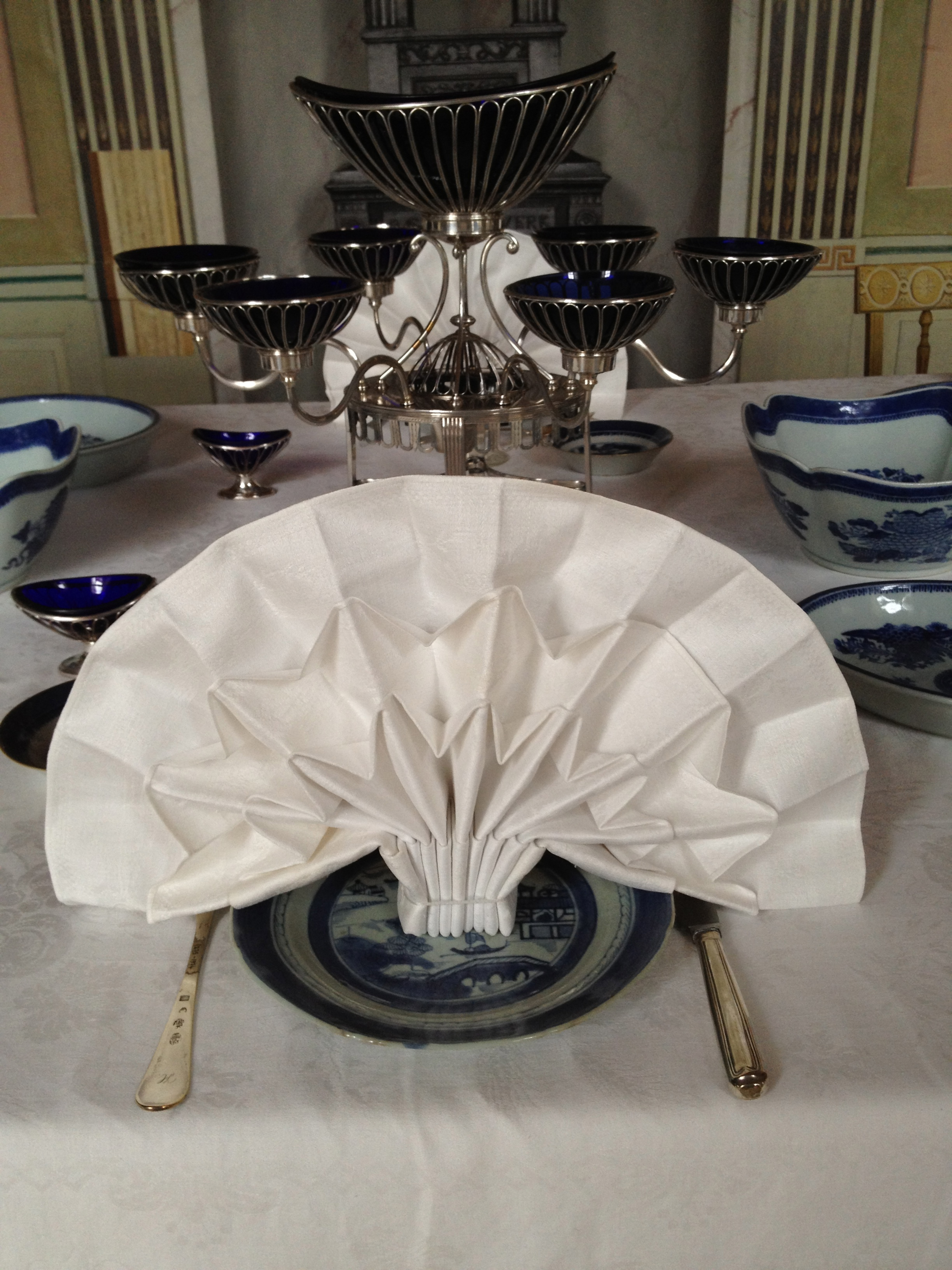
A folded napkin.

Conventionally, the napkin is folded and placed to the left of the place setting, outside the outermost fork. In a restaurant setting or a caterer's hall, it may be folded into more elaborate shapes and displayed on the empty plate. Origami techniques can be used to create a three-dimensional design. A napkin may also be held together in a bundle with cutlery by a napkin ring. Alternatively, paper napkins may be contained within a napkin holder.

== History ==
The Greeks used apomagdalia (ἀπομαγδαλία), which could be bread, dough, or fat, to wipe themselves. Sometimes this substance was later thrown to dogs. The term was also used for dog food made of dough and fat. Later, they began using the cheiromaktron (χειρόμακτρον, "hand-wipe"), a cloth for wiping the hands, which the Romans called mantelium (μανδήλιον).

One of the earliest references to table napkins in English dates to 1384–85.

=== Paper napkins ===
The use of paper napkins is documented in ancient China, where paper was invented in the 2nd century BC. Paper napkins were known as chih pha, folded in squares, and used for the serving of tea. Textual evidence of paper napkins appears in a description of the possessions of the Yu family, from the city of Hangzhou.

Paper napkins were first imported to the US in the late 1800s but did not gain widespread acceptance until 1948, when Emily Post asserted, "It’s far better form to use paper napkins than linen napkins that were used at breakfast."

=== Leonardo Da Vinci ===
It has been claimed that Leonardo da Vinci invented the napkin in 1491. According to this claim, the Duke of Milan, Ludovico Sforza, used to tie up live rabbits decorated with ribbons to the guest’s chairs so they could wipe their hands on the animal’s back. Leonardo found this inappropriate, and presented a cloth for each guest. The myth stems from Leonardo's Kitchen Notebooks (1987), by Jonathan Routh and Shelagh Routh, a prank book published as an April Fools’ Day joke, that claims a long lost Codex Romanoff was found in 1481, which never really existed.

== See also ==
- Handkerchief
- Paper napkins
- Sanitary napkin
- Wet wipe
