= Napkin ring =

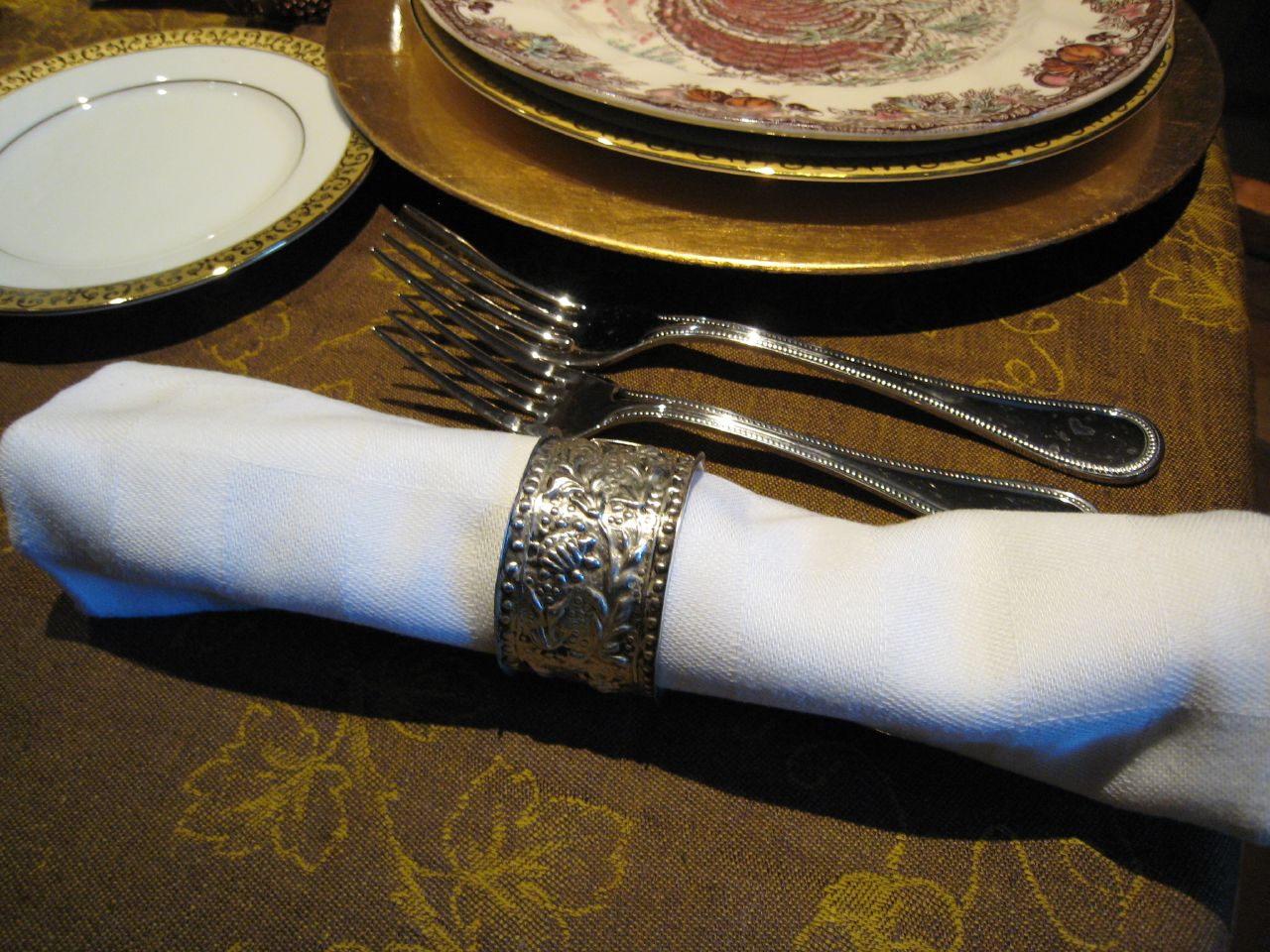
Napkin with ring

The napkin ring, occasionally called a Christening bangle, was originally used to identify the napkins of a household between weekly wash days. The figural napkin ring is an American specialty in which the simple napkin ring is part of a small figure or sculpture that may take any shape and show any motif. Napkin rings appear as single items with the name or initials of the owner, notably given as christening presents, or pairs often given as gifts at weddings and silver weddings. In the English speaking countries, numbered sets of 4, 6, 8, 10 or 12 napkin rings are found. Napkin rings are an invention of the European bourgeoisie, first appearing in France about 1800 and soon spreading to all countries in the western world. Most 19th century napkin rings were made of silver or silver plate, but others were made in bone, wood, pearl embroidery, porcelain, glass, and other materials. In the 20th century, bakelite and other new materials were used.
