= Chinese spoon =

Type of spoon used in Chinese cuisine

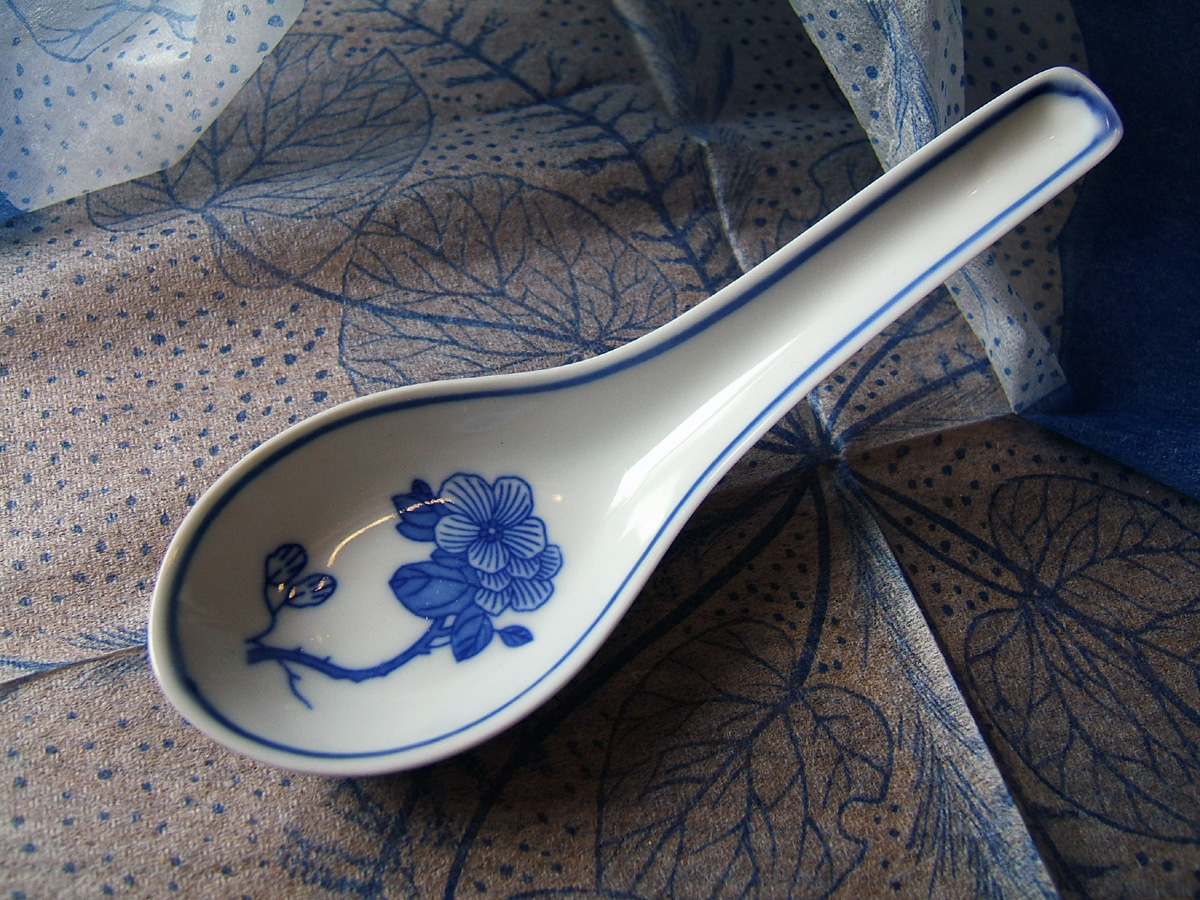
- Chinese porcelain spoon

Chinese name
- Traditional Chinese: 調羹
- Simplified Chinese: 调羹
- Literal meaning: for adjusting seasoning of geng
Transcriptions
Standard Mandarin
- Hanyu Pinyin: tiáogēng

Alternative Chinese name
- Traditional Chinese: 湯匙
- Simplified Chinese: 汤匙
- Literal meaning: soup spoon
Transcriptions
Standard Mandarin
- Hanyu Pinyin: tāngchí

Second alternative Chinese name
- Chinese: 勺子
- Literal meaning: ladle
Transcriptions
Standard Mandarin
- Hanyu Pinyin: sháozi

Japanese name
- Kanji: 散蓮華
- Hiragana: ちりれんげ
- Literal meaning: scattered lotus
Transcriptions
- Romanization: chirirenge

The Chinese spoon or Chinese soup spoon is a type of spoon with a short, thick handle extending directly from a deep, flat bowl. It is a regular utensil in Chinese cuisine used for liquids, especially soups, or loose solid food. Most are made from ceramics. Although normally used as an eating utensil, larger versions of the Chinese spoon are also used as serving spoons or ladles. The shape allows spoons of the same size and design to be stacked on top of one another for storage.

Spoons were used as early as the Shang dynasty of the 2nd millennium B.C., both as a cooking tool and in eating, and were more common than chopsticks until perhaps the 10th century A.D.

Chinese spoons typically have higher sides and can hold more than the western soup spoon.

== History ==
The spoon (匕; bǐ) was known as early as the Shang dynasty. The earliest found were made of bone, but bronze specimens are also found that have sharp points, suggesting they were used for cutting. These could be more than a foot long. During the Spring and Autumn period a rounder form appeared, and lacquer spoons are also found, becoming popular in the Han dynasty.

In ancient China the spoon was more common than chopsticks, which were used in cooking. The spoon was more useful for eating because the most common food grain in North China was millet, which was made into a congee, or gruel. The spoon was better fitted for eating its soupy texture in an elegant way.

The spoon was gradually undermined as the most common eating utensil starting in the Han, roughly the 1st century A.D., when wheat began to be more widely grown. Milling technology became sophisticated enough to produce flour for noodles and dumplings. Since these were more easily lifted with chopsticks, the spoon lost its prominence by about the Song dynasty, or 10th century. Early-ripening rice, which was introduced from Vietnam at this time, was even easier to eat with chopsticks, since it cooked into clumps.

The first compasses were created in China in the Han or soon after the Han by using a spoon shaped lodestone which rotated on a bronze plate (see image below).

In the system of classification used in the Kangxi Dictionary, compiled in the 18th century, Radical 21 (classifier #21) is "spoon."

== Spoons in history ==
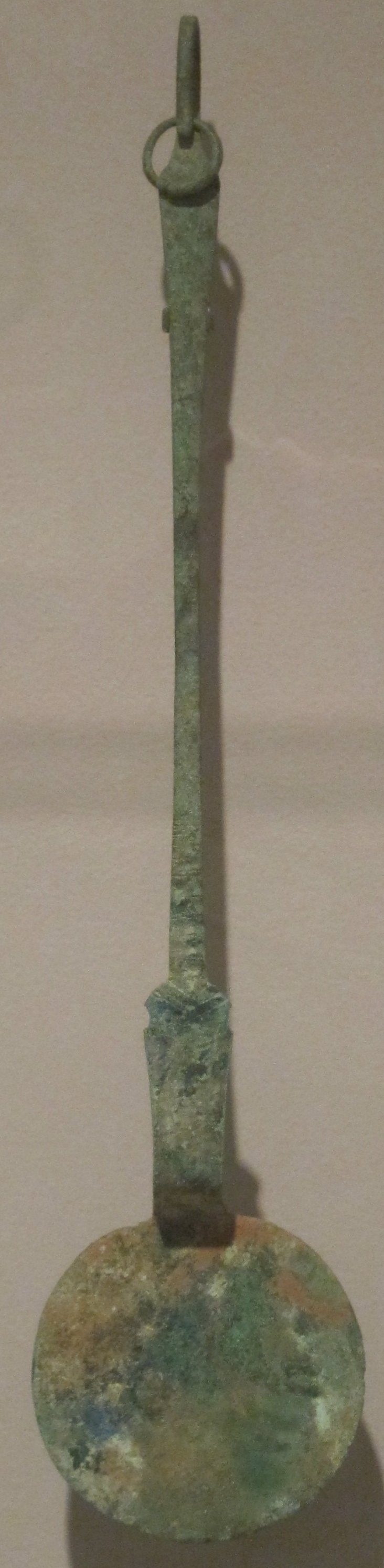
Han dynasty flat spoon (Honolulu Museum of Art)

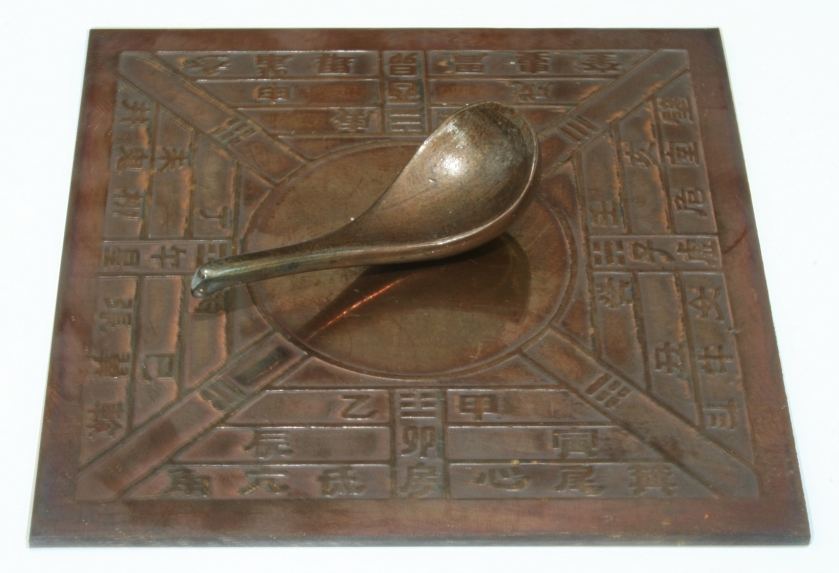
Han dynasty spoon compass

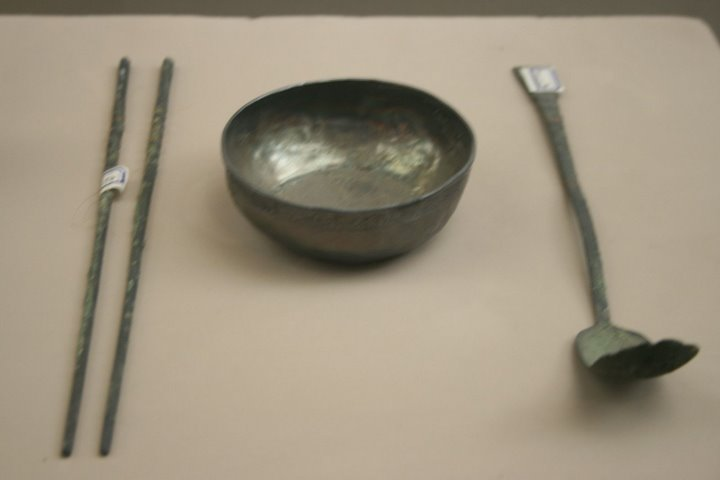
Song dynasty silver chopsticks, cup, and spoon

== Modern spoons ==
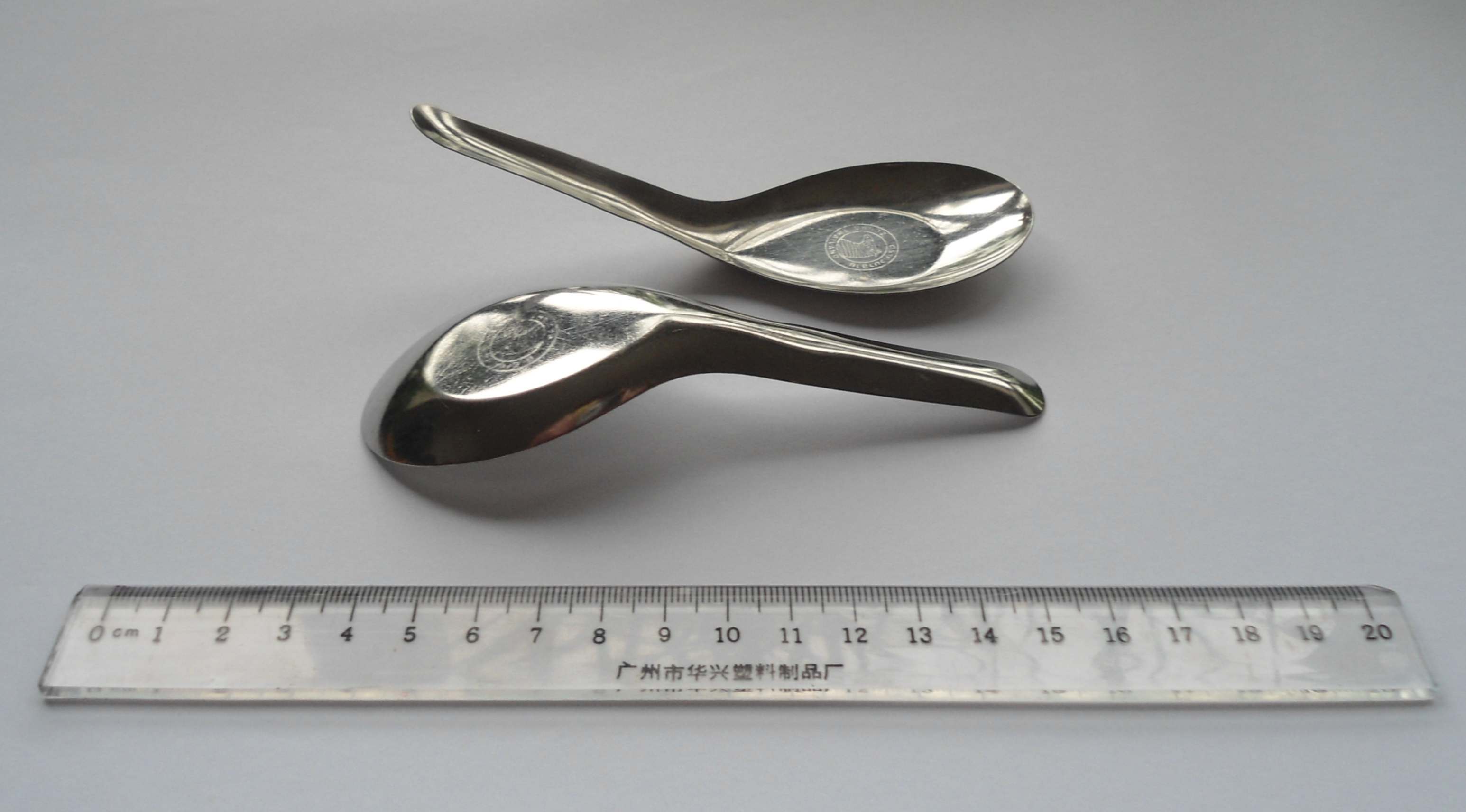
Stainless steel spoons

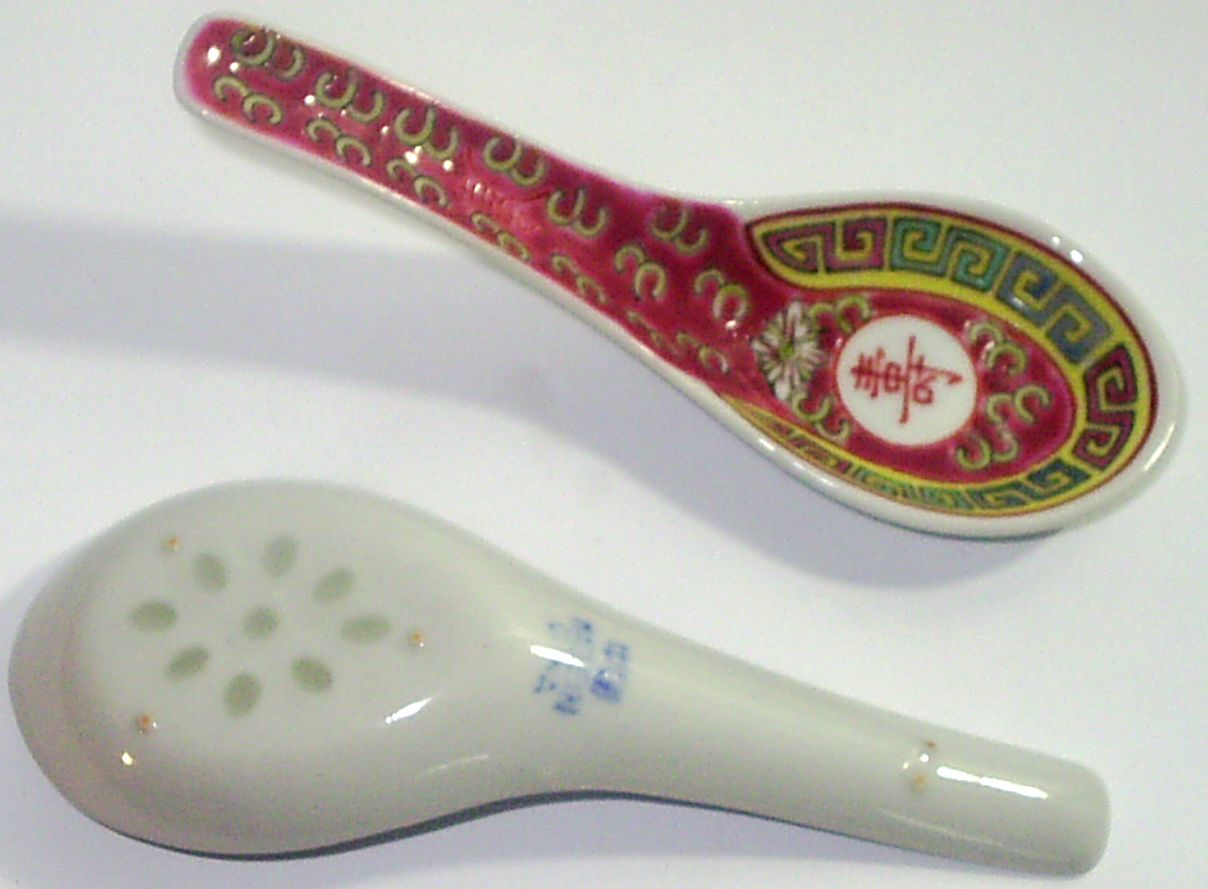
Porcelain spoons

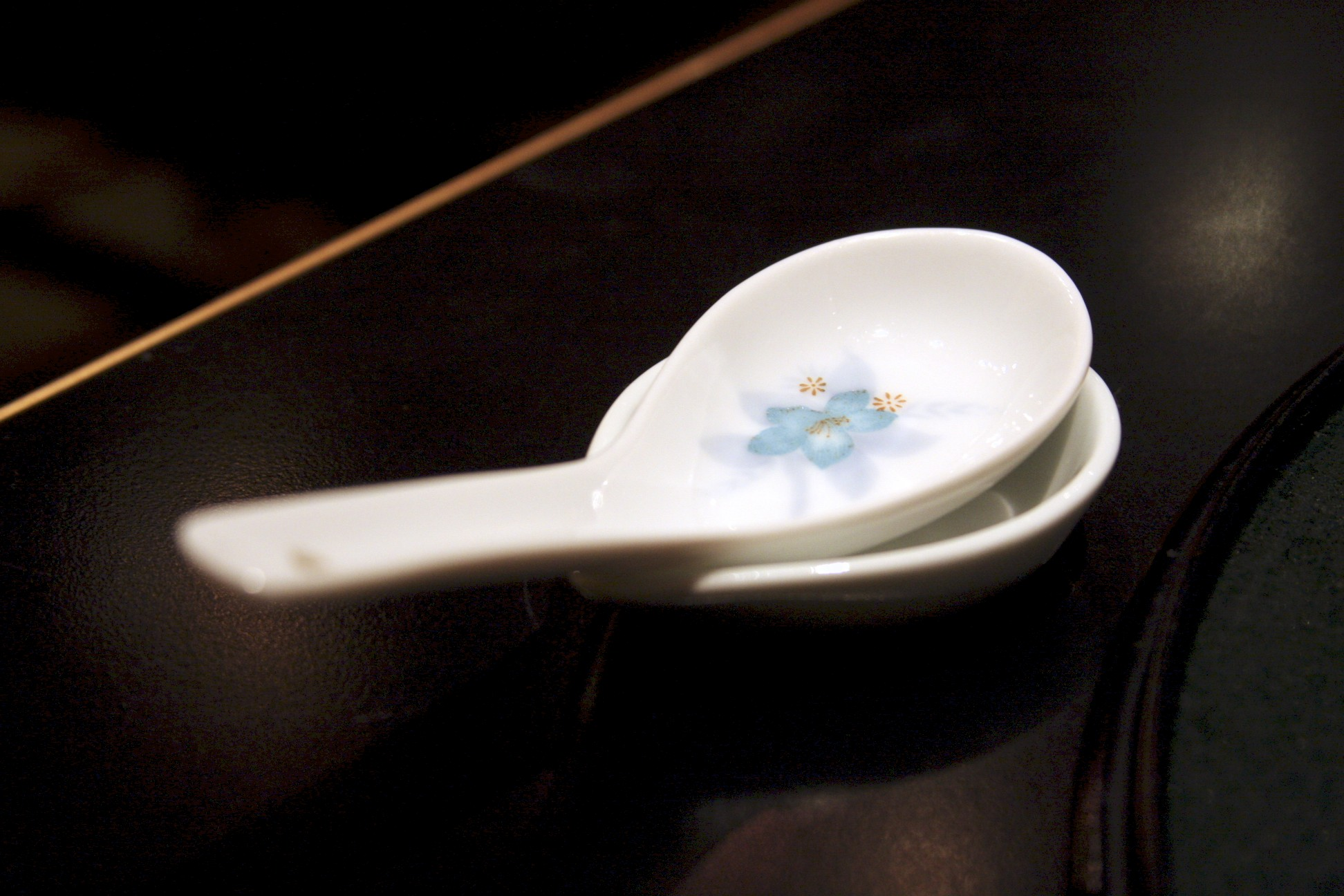
Spoon on a spoon rest

== See also ==
- Chopsticks – Shaped pairs of sticks used as kitchen and eating utensils
- Soup spoon – Spoon used for eating soup
- Sujeo – Korean eating utensils
