= Knife rest =

Piece of kitchenware

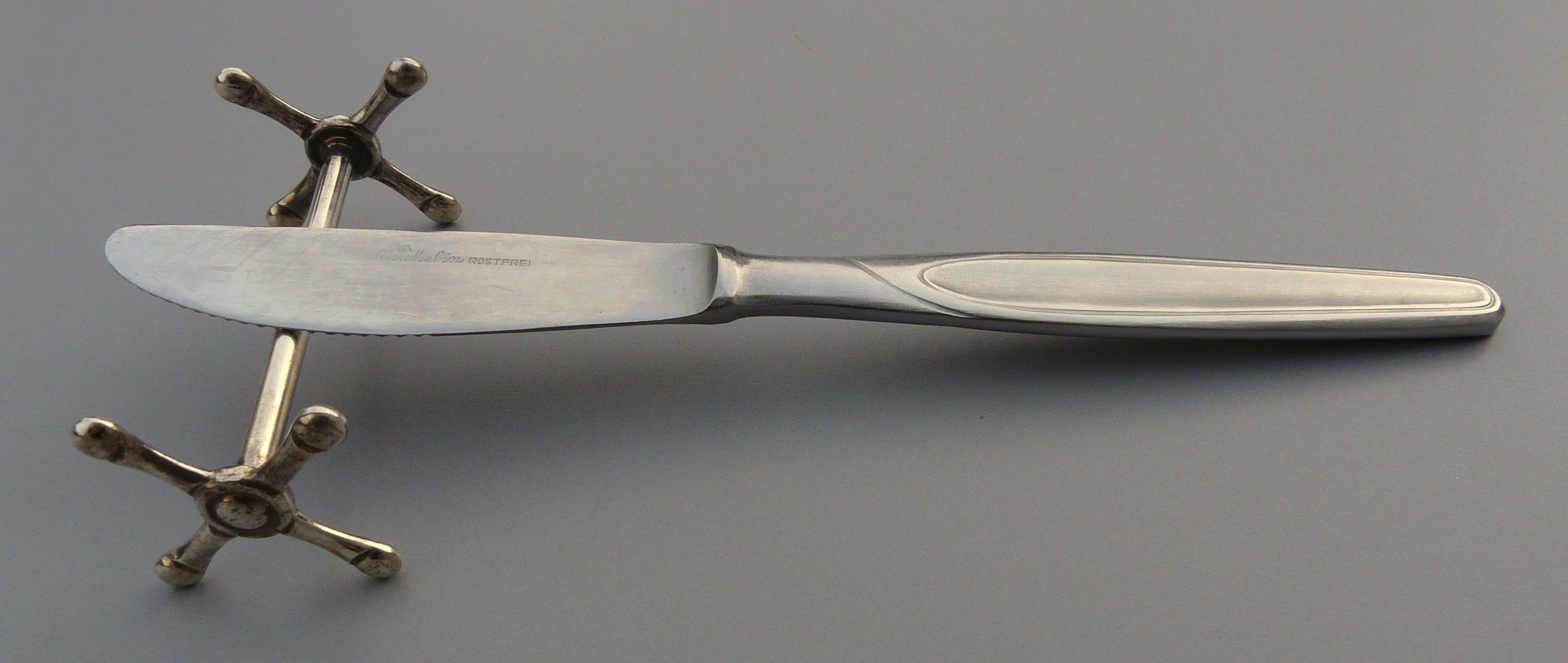
A knife rest

A knife rest is a piece of kitchenware used to rest a used knife without touching the table, preventing cooking fluids from getting onto tables.

Similar tools are the chopstick rest, spoon rest, and spoon and chopstick rest used in Asian cuisine.

== History ==
Knife rests in their modern form were invented in the late 17th century or early 18th century, but earlier ones, possibly just wood, were used during the time of Henry VIII. They were invented to save the knife, fork, and tablecloth from being stained by cooking fluids. Later, however, they were developed in sets.

In the Victorian era, knife rests were made in a wide variety of materials, designs, and configurations. Materials used included gold, silver, mother of pearl, and ivory. The French also created knife rests known as porte-couteaux. Russians, Germans, and other Europeans also developed knife rests around this time. The Chinese created chopstick rests in the same manner.

From the late 19th century, most knives were designed to be weighted towards the handle. For this reason, late Victorian etiquette manuals mention that knife rests and worries about fouling the tablecloth had become unnecessary. Towards the middle of the 20th century it was often the case that heavy bone handles were replaced with lighter white plastic, which caused classic-style cutlery to again threaten tablecloths.

In the Western world, knife rests were used at table through the first half of the twentieth century, mainly by the upper classes, but now usually are purchased mostly as collector's items.

== See also ==
- Chopstick rest
- Spoon rest
- Spoon and chopstick rest
