= Chopstick rest =

Tableware

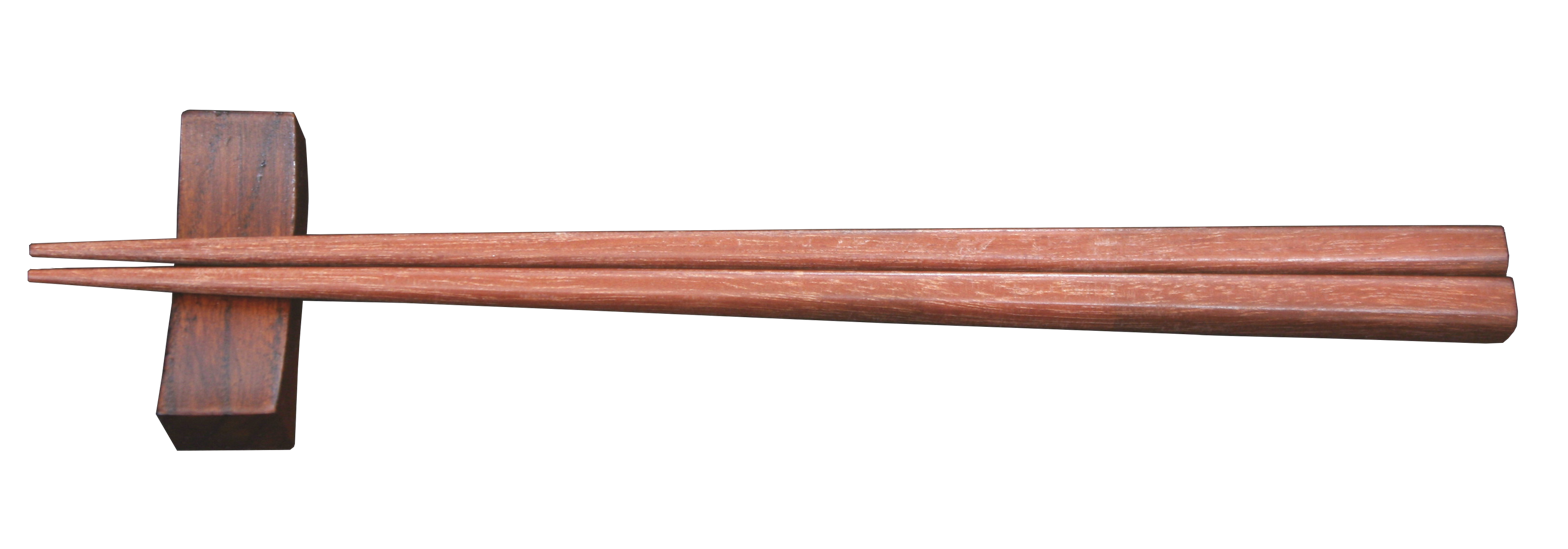
A pair of chopsticks made from yew on a wooden chopstick rest

A chopstick rest is tableware, similar to a knife rest or a spoon rest, used to keep chopstick tips off the table and to prevent used chopsticks from contaminating or rolling off tables. Chopstick rests are found more commonly in restaurants than in homes. They come in various shapes and are made from clay, wood, plastic, metal, glass, porcelain or precious stones such as jade. If the chopsticks come in paper sleeves, some people fold the sleeves into chopstick rests.

In East Asia, chopstick rests are usually used at formal dinners. They are placed on the front-left side of the dishes, with the chopsticks parallel to the table edge and the points toward the left, or to the right side of the dishes, with the chopstick points towards to the front.

== Gallery ==
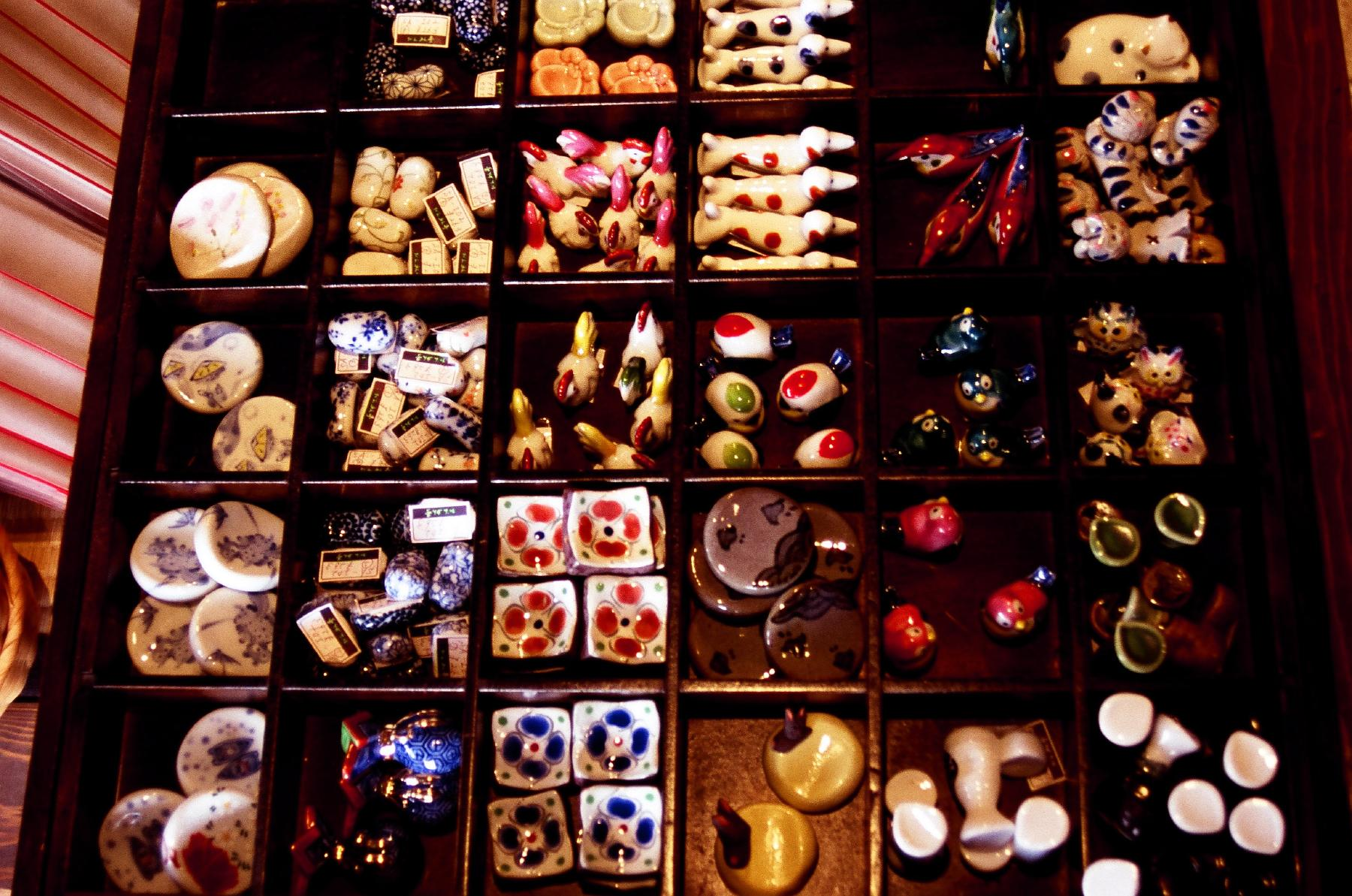
Various kinds of rests

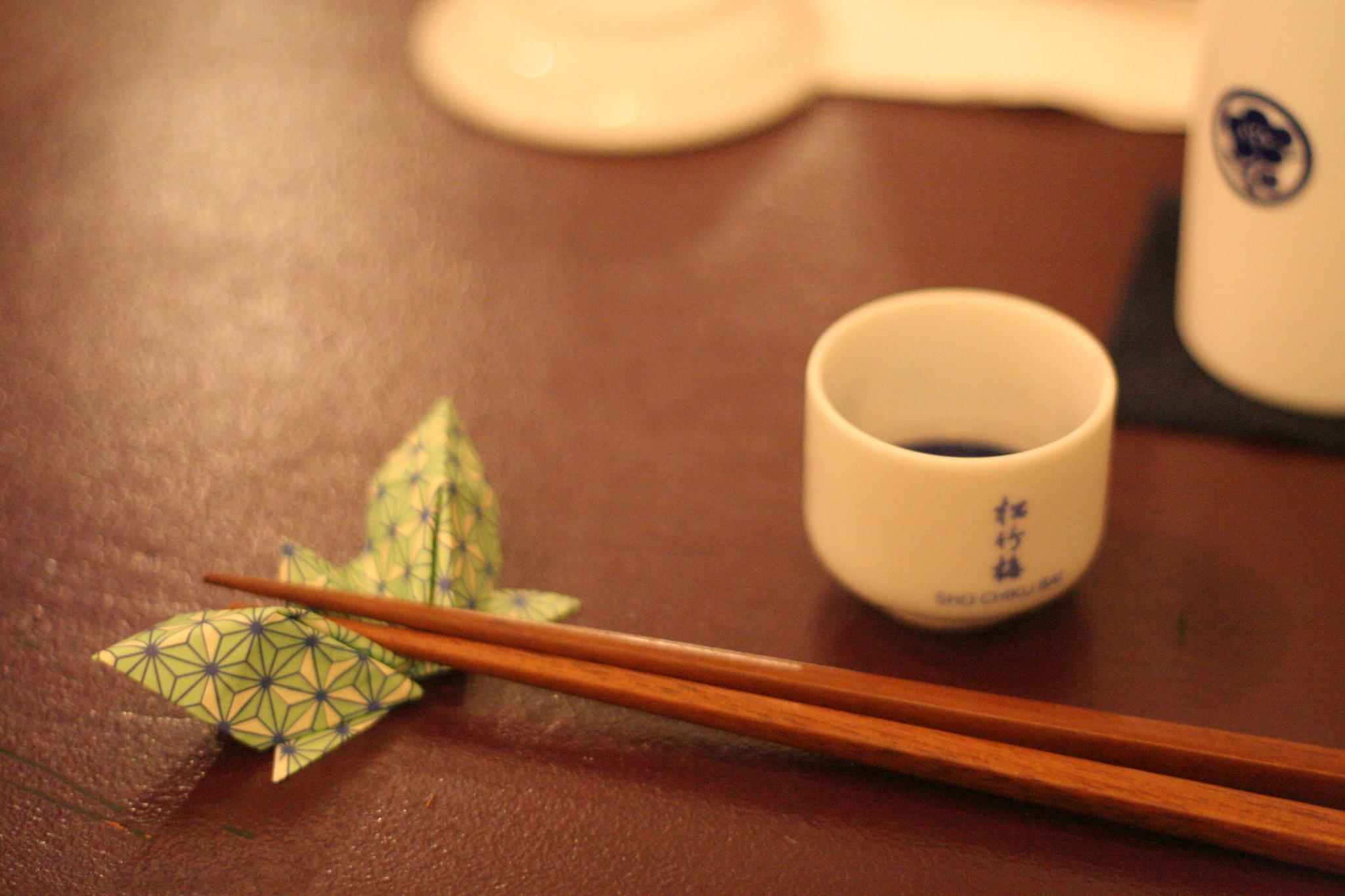
Origami chopstick rest

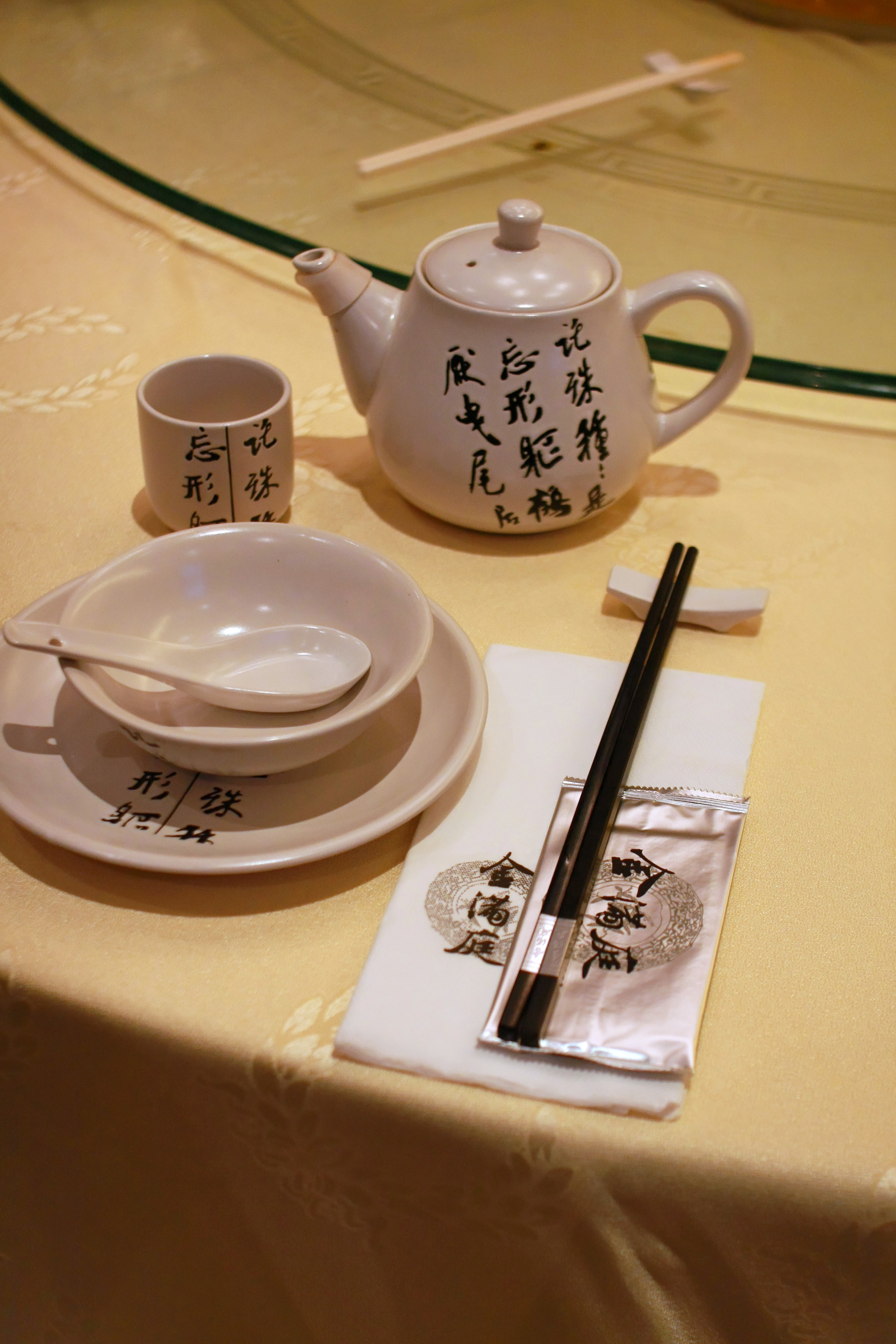
Chinese style setting

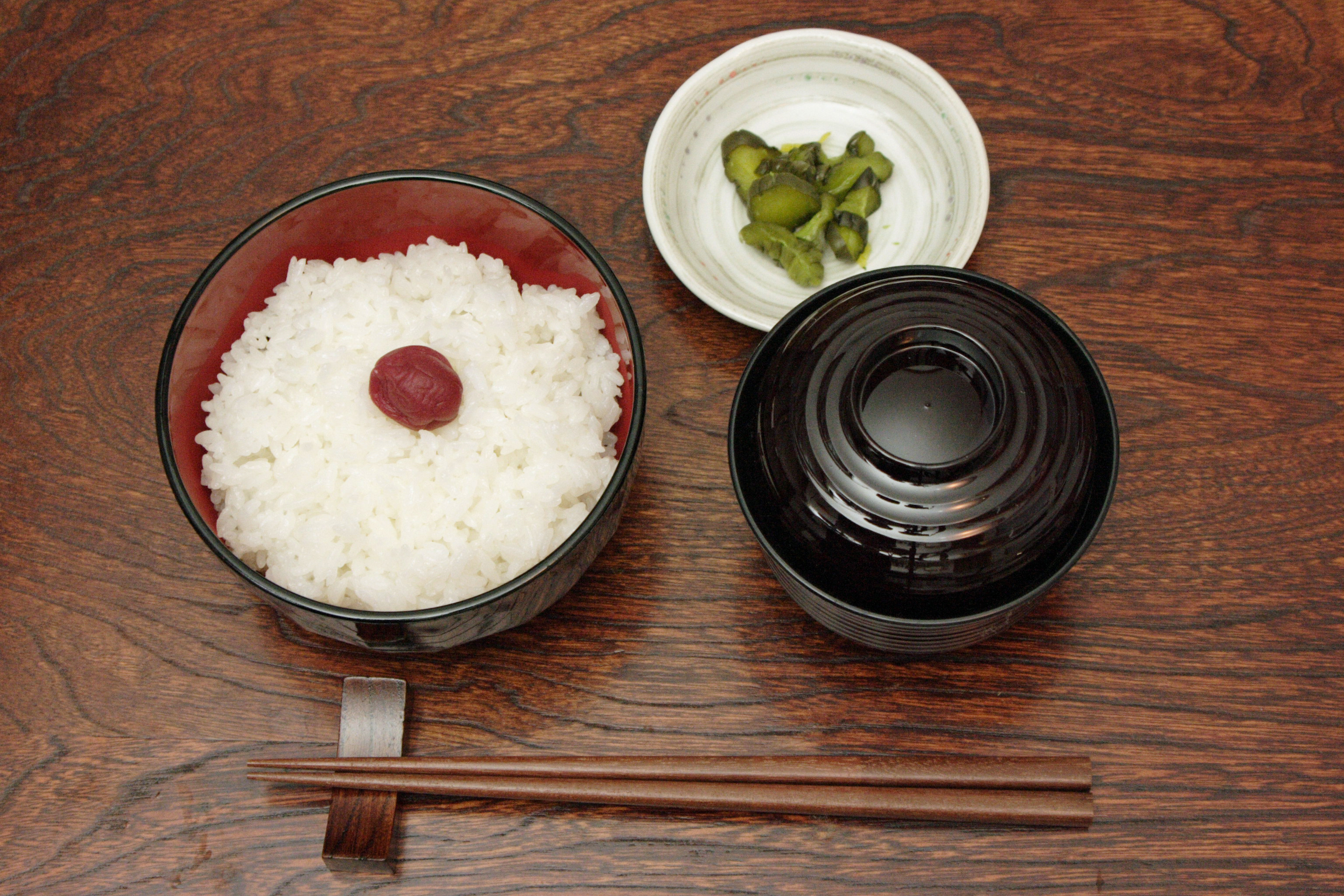
A typical Japanese meal—chopsticks on a chopstick rest at the front side of the dishes, pointing to the left

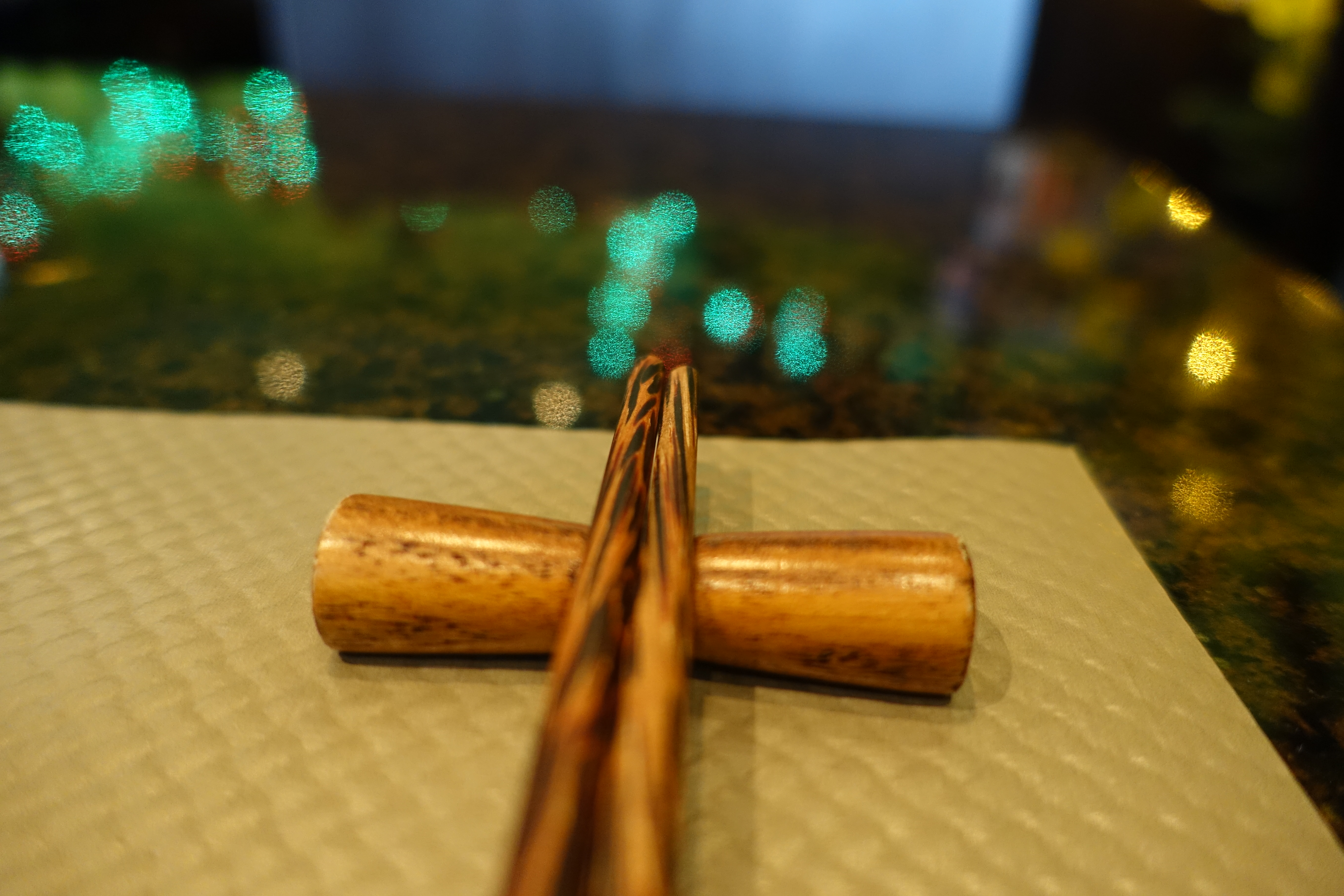

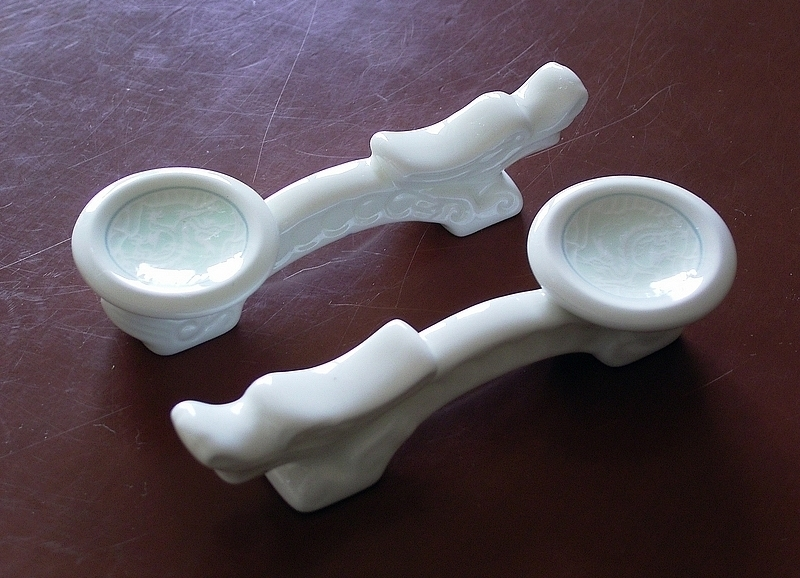
Noritake Chinese chopstick rest

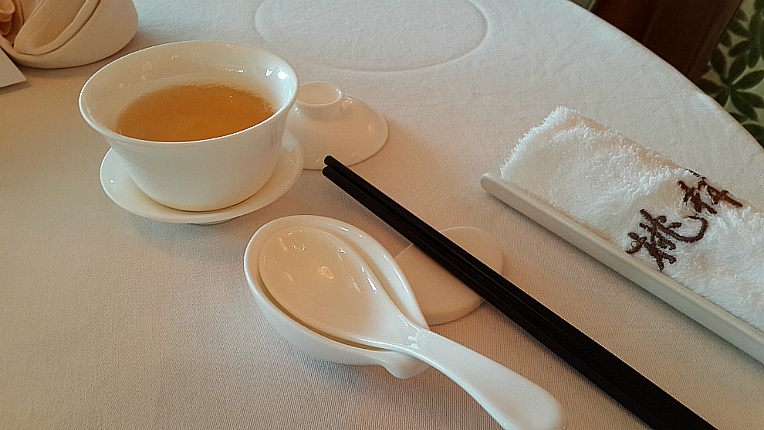
Chinese spoon and chopstick rest

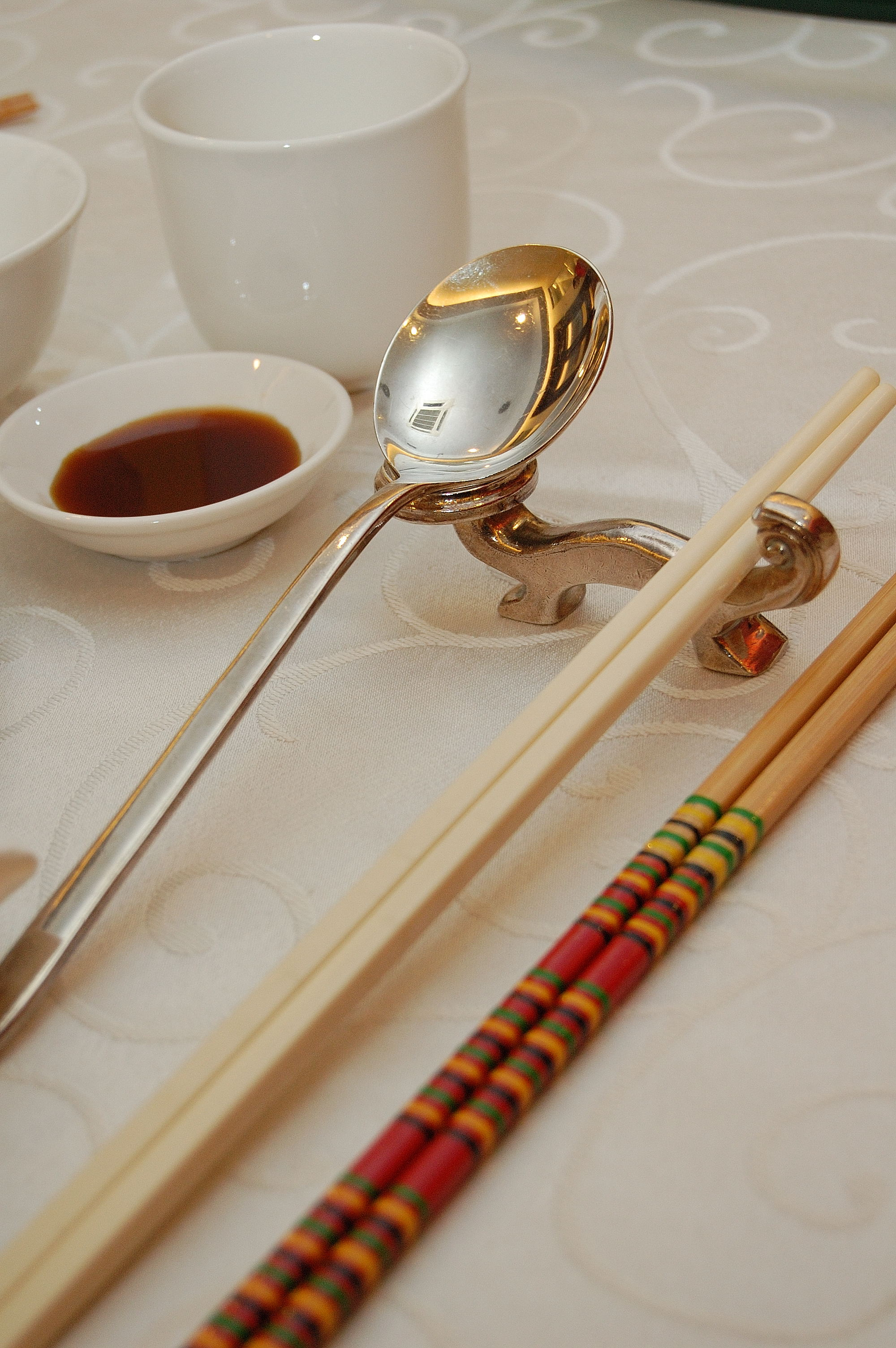
Chinese metal dragon shaped chopsticks spoon rack

== See also ==
- Chopsticks
- Spoon rest
- Spoon and chopstick rest
