= Spoon rest (disambiguation) =

A spoon rest is a piece of kitchenware.

Spoon rest may also refer to:

- P-12 radar, NATO reporting names "Spoon Rest A", "Spoon Rest B", and "Spoon Rest C"
- P-18 radar, NATO reporting name "Spoon Rest D"
