= Spoon and chopstick rest =

Tableware

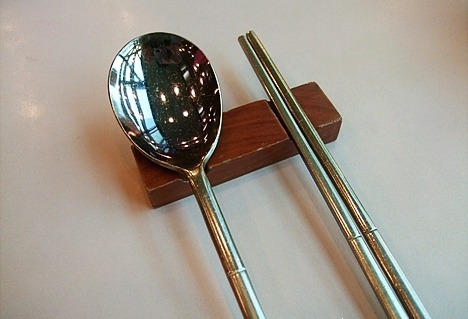
Spoon and chopstick rest

A spoon and chopstick rest is a piece of tableware on which a spoon and chopsticks can be placed without their used ends touching the table. In Korean cuisine context, it can be referred to as sujeo rest as sujeo is a paired set of spoon and chopsticks, which is very common in Korea.

== Gallery ==
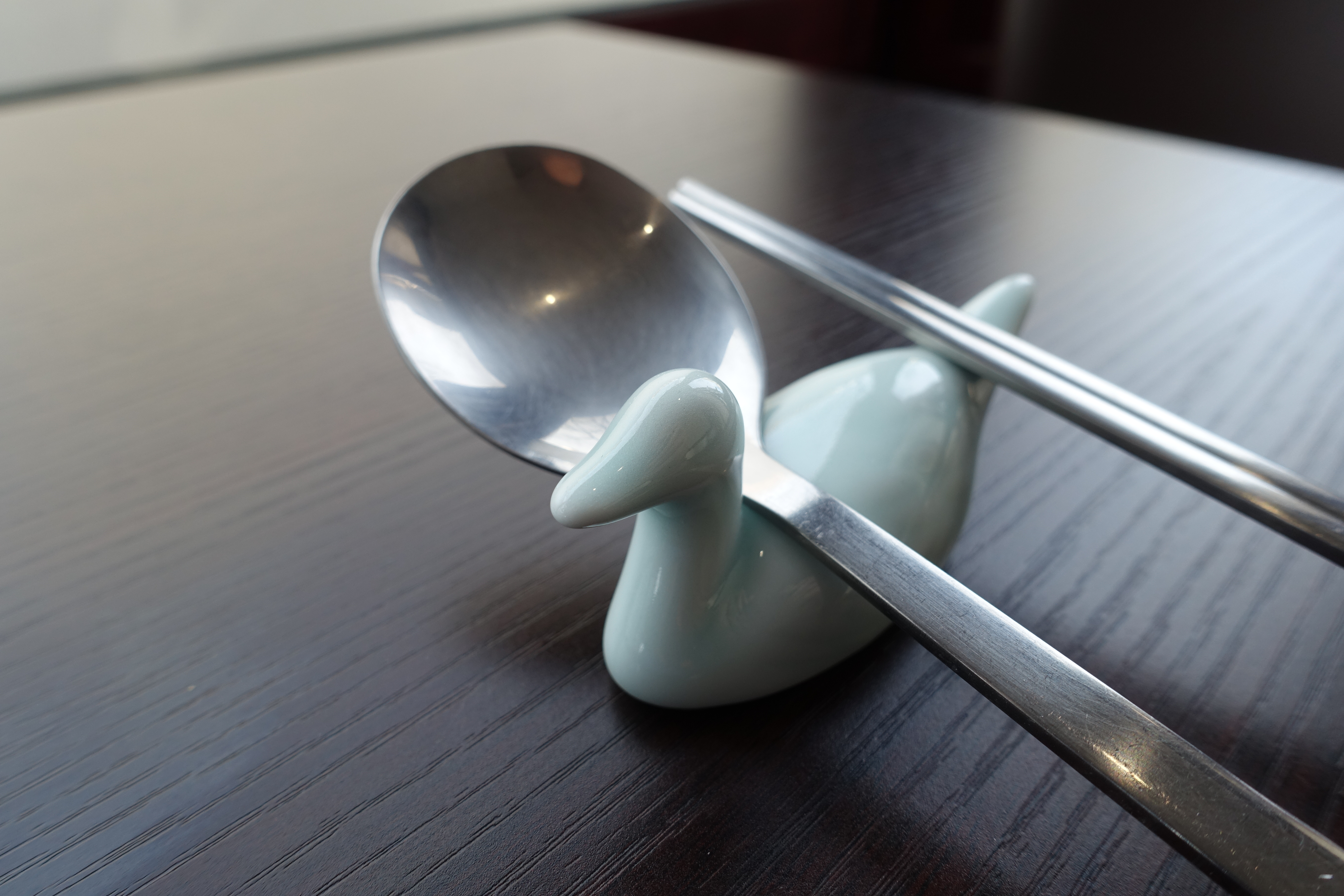
A sujeo rest in a Korean restaurant in Paris, France

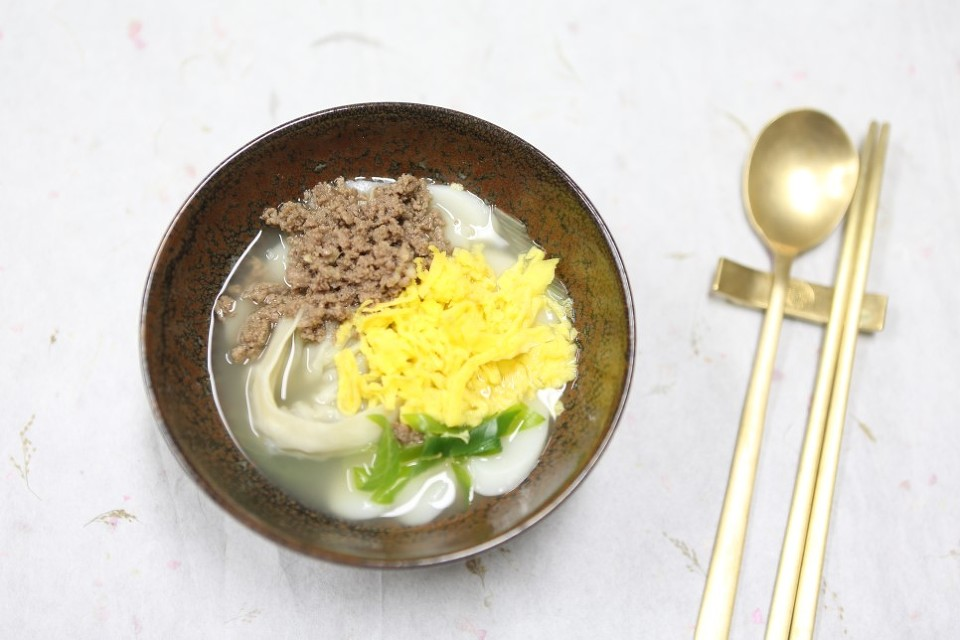
Korean sujeo-rest

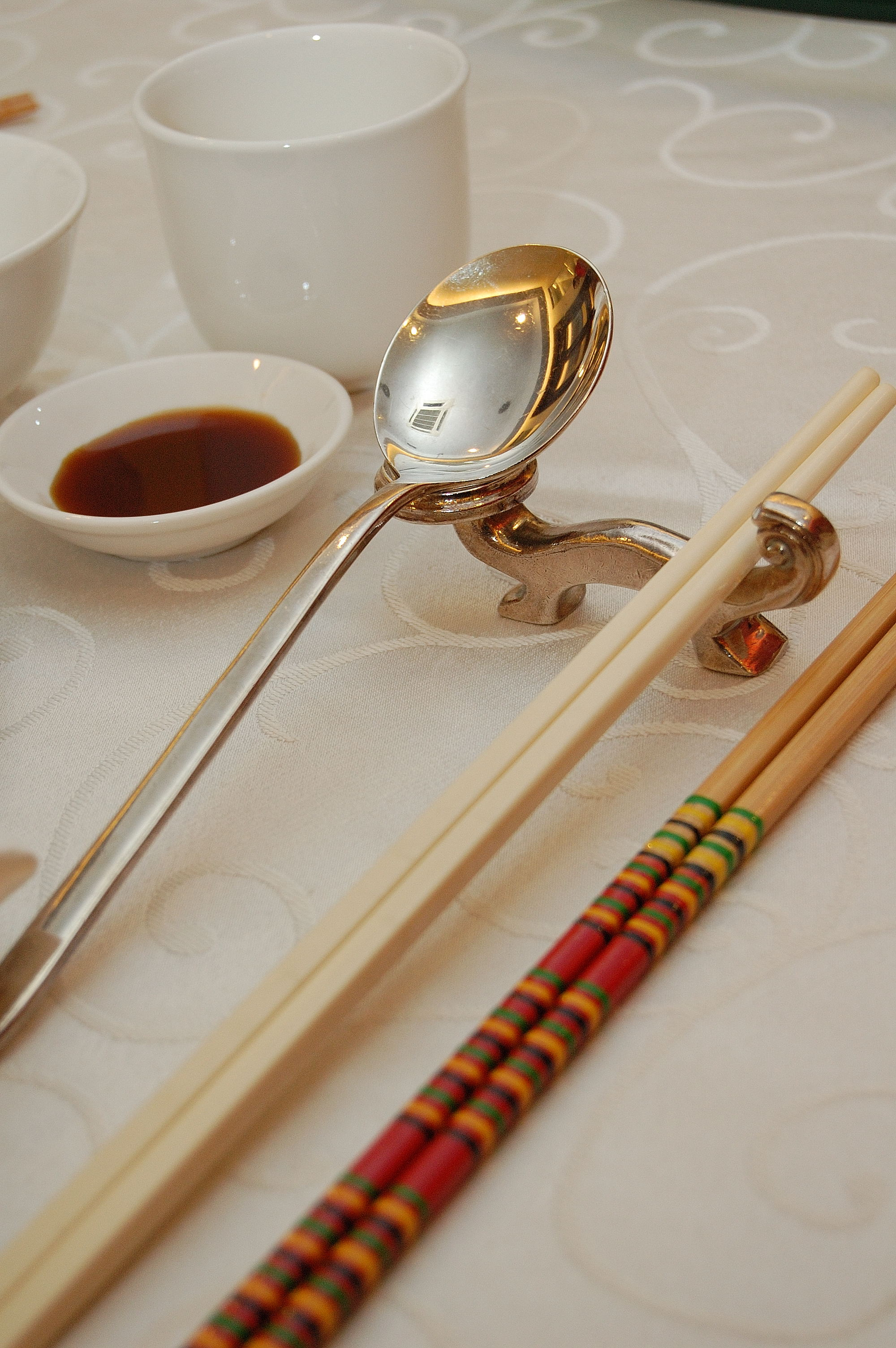
A spoon and chopstick rest in a Chinese buffet in Kuala Lumpur, Malaysia

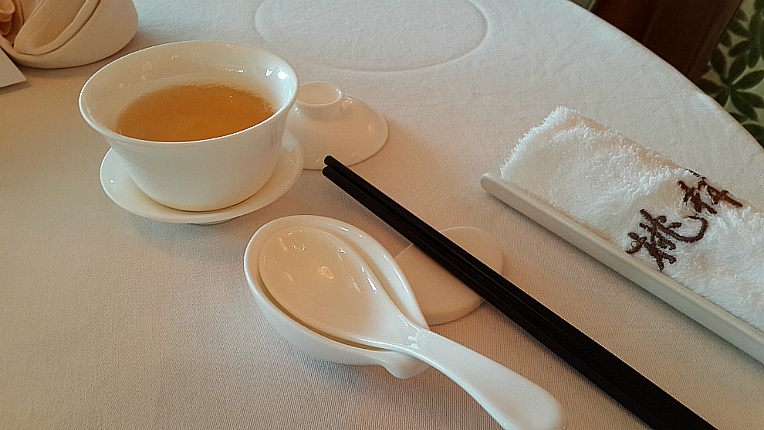
A spoon and chopstick rest in a Chinese restaurant in Busan, Korea

== See also ==
- Chopstick rest
- Knife rest
- Spoon rest
