= Soup spoon =

Spoon used for eating soup

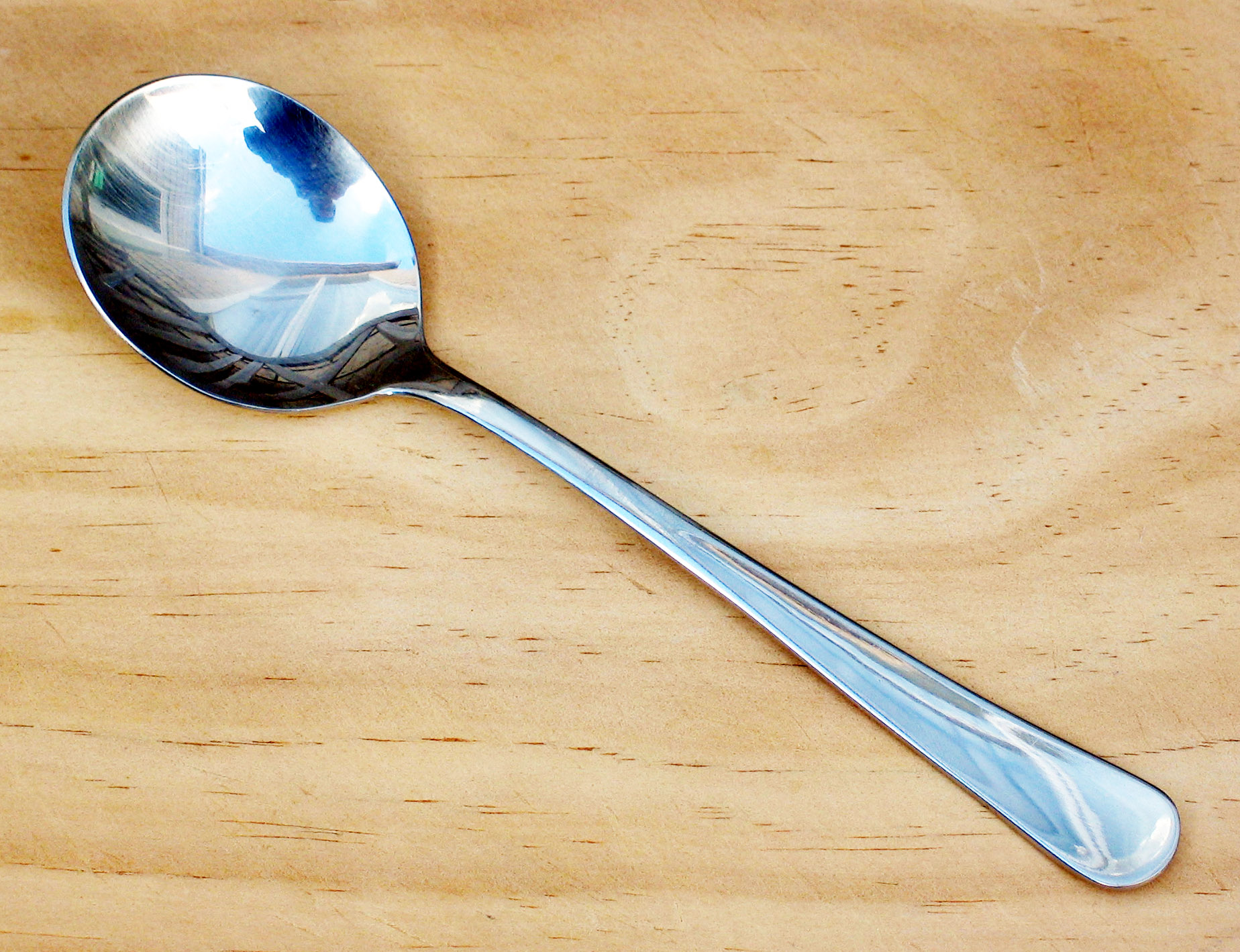
Western soup spoon

A soup spoon is a type of spoon with a large or rounded bowl, used for consuming soup. The term can either refer to the British soup spoon or the Chinese spoon. Round bowled soup spoons were a Victorian invention. Sets of silverware made prior to about 1900 do not have round soup spoons; a tablespoon was used (and still is in some British houses where the silver predates 1900).

== Western ==
The British soup spoon is the length of a dessert spoon (i.e., smaller than a tablespoon) but with a deeper, more circular bowl for holding liquid. Modern soup spoons are usually stainless steel or silver-plated, but in the past wooden and horn spoons were more common. The idea of including a separate soup spoon in a table setting originated in the eighteenth century, when the bowl shapes varied widely, deep or shallow, oval, pointed, egg-shaped or circular. Spoon shapes became more standardized in nineteenth-century silverware.

The rounded form of soup spoon is not generally used in continental Europe, where an oval-shaped spoon is traditionally used.

== Chinese ==
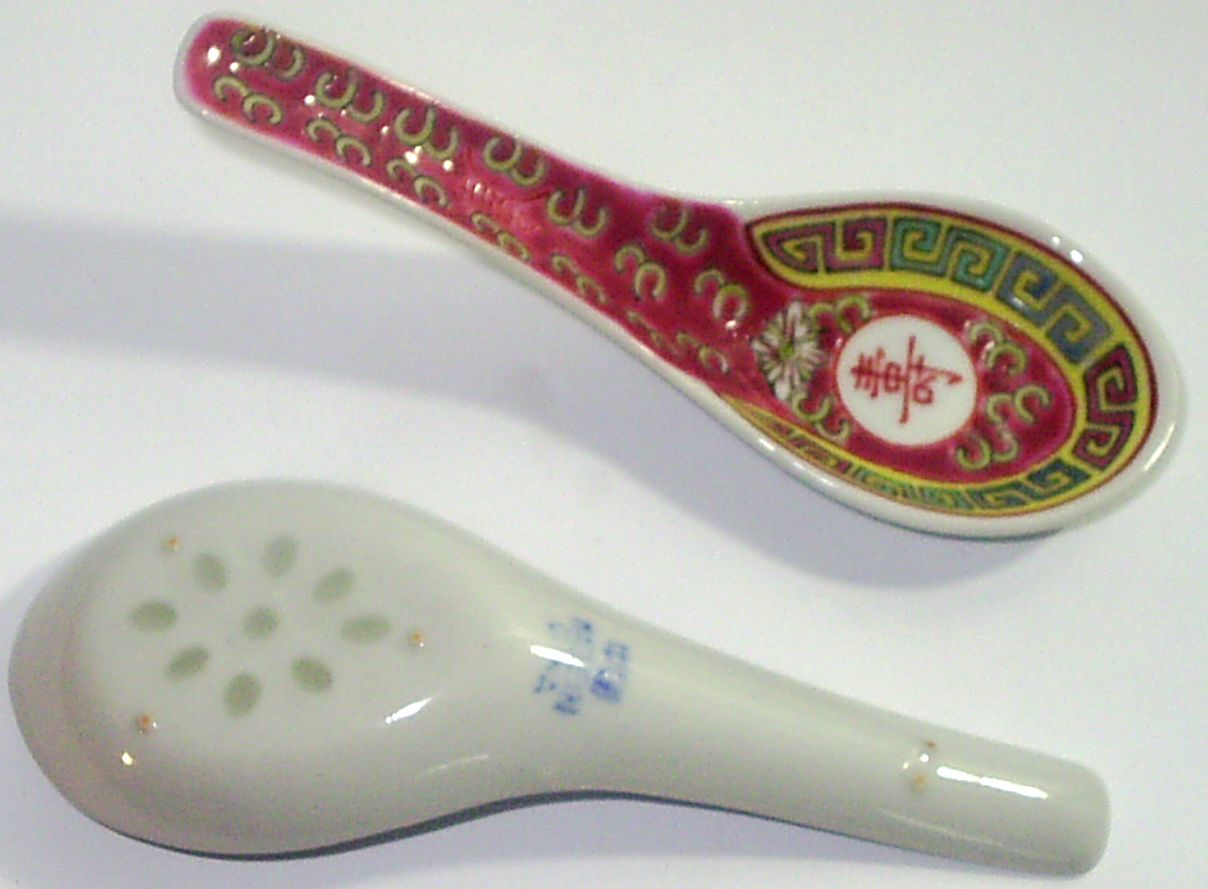
Typical Chinese soup spoons

The Chinese soup spoon, usually ceramic and of a distinct shape, can vary in size from normal soup spoon size to near-platter size.
