= Sujeo =

Korean eating utensils

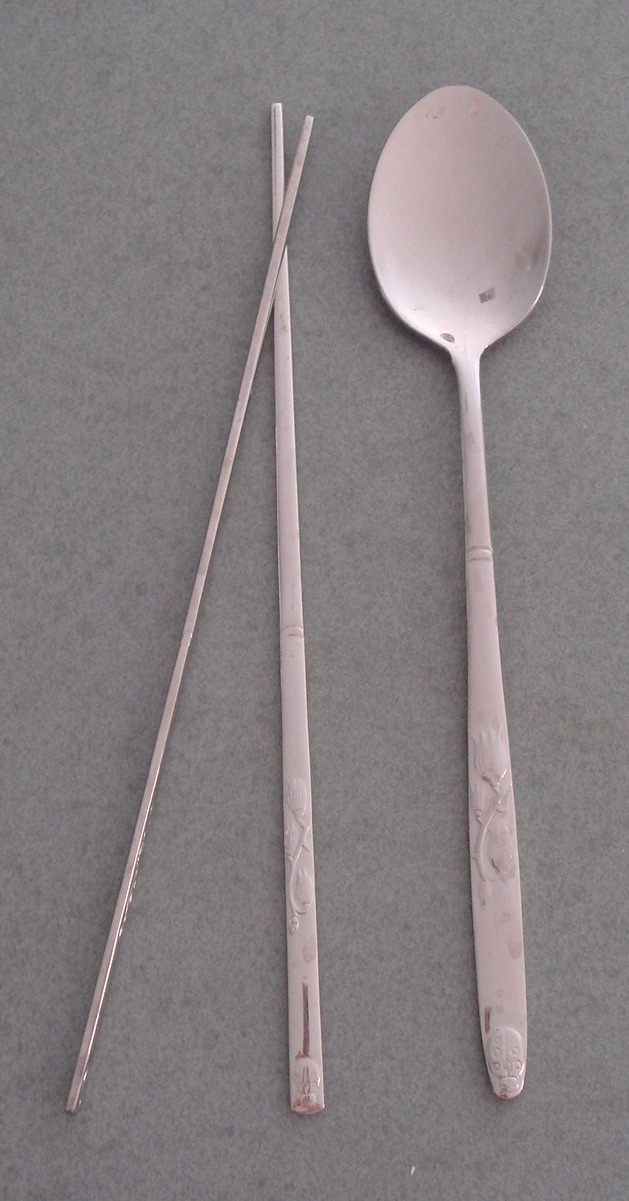
- Sujeo, Korean eating utensils.

Korean name
- Hangul: 수저
- RR: sujeo
- MR: sujŏ

Sujeo (Korean: 수저) is the Korean term for the set of eating utensils commonly used to eat Korean cuisine. The word is a portmanteau of the words sutgarak (숟가락, 'spoon') and jeotgarak (젓가락, 'chopsticks'). The sujeo set includes a pair of metal (often stainless steel) chopsticks with an oval or rounded-rectangular cross-section, and a long handled shallow spoon of the same material. One may use both at the same time, but this is a recent way to eat quicker. It is not considered good etiquette to hold the spoon and the chopstick together in one hand especially while eating with elders. More often food is eaten with chopsticks alone. Sometimes the spoon apart from chopsticks is referred to as sujeo.

Chopsticks may be put down on a table or on a purpose designed chopstick rest, but never put into food standing up, particularly rice, as this is considered to bring bad luck since it resembles food offerings at a grave to deceased ancestors. In various Asian cultures, burning incense at shrines and graves is a common practice to honor ancestors, deities, and the deceased. It is considered offensive to the dead and gods to put chopsticks vertically into food as it mimics this practice. The spoon may be laid down on the rice bowl, or soup bowl, if it has not been used. As food is eaten quickly, and portions are small, little time is spent in putting eating utensils down.

Cases for sujeo in paper or Korean fabrics were often embroidered with symbols of longevity and given as gifts, particularly at weddings. They are now sold as souvenirs.

== See also ==
- Spoon and chopstick rest
- Korean cuisine
- Korean culture
- Chopsticks
