= Spoon rest =

Kitchenware

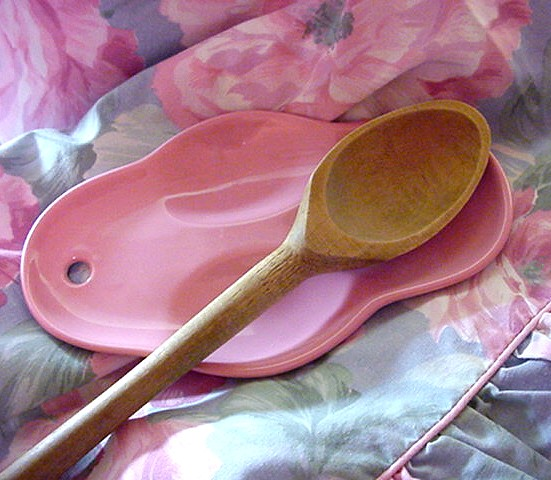
A pink spoon rest for 3 spoons

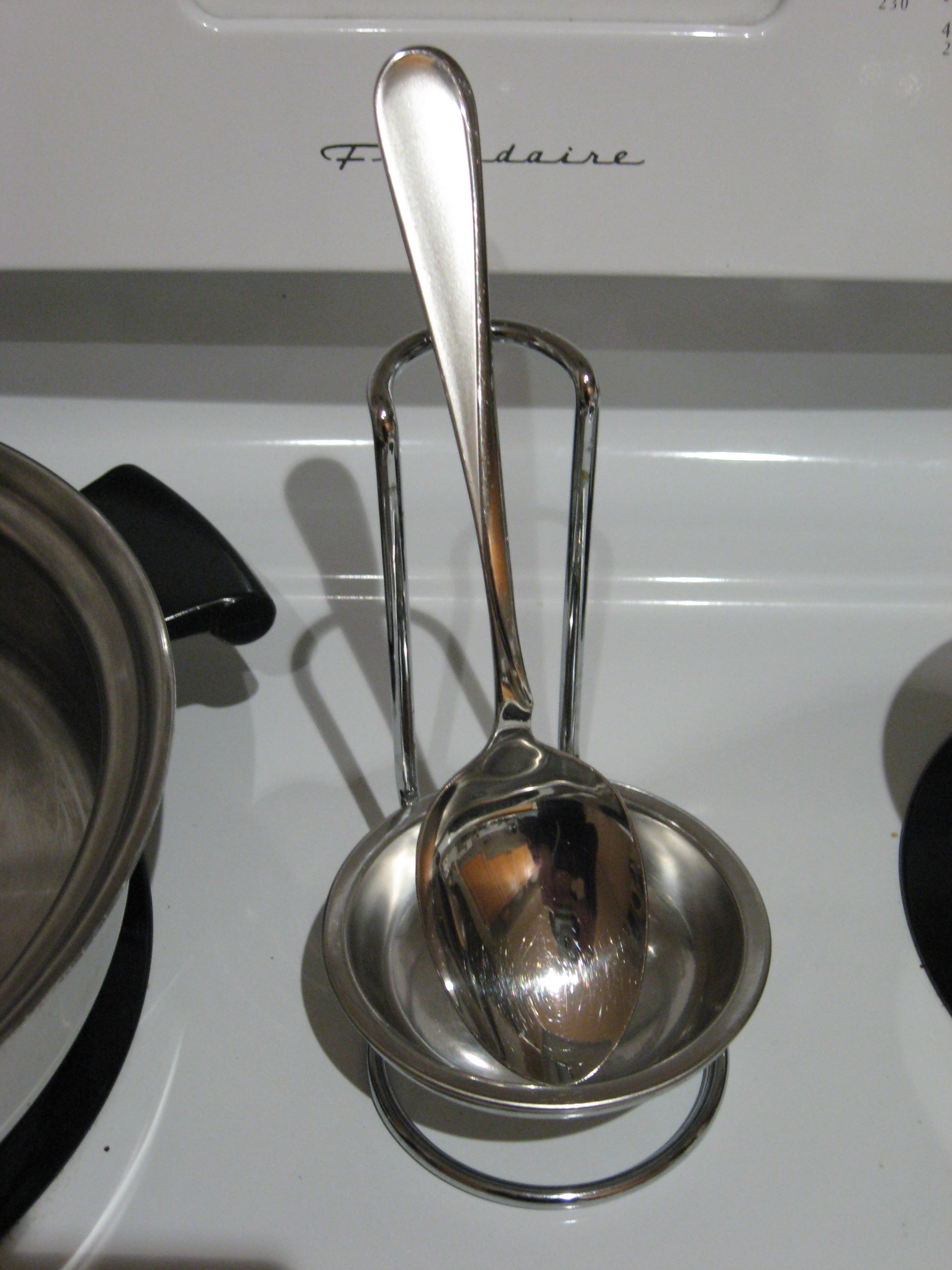
A serving spoon resting on a vertical "ladle rest"

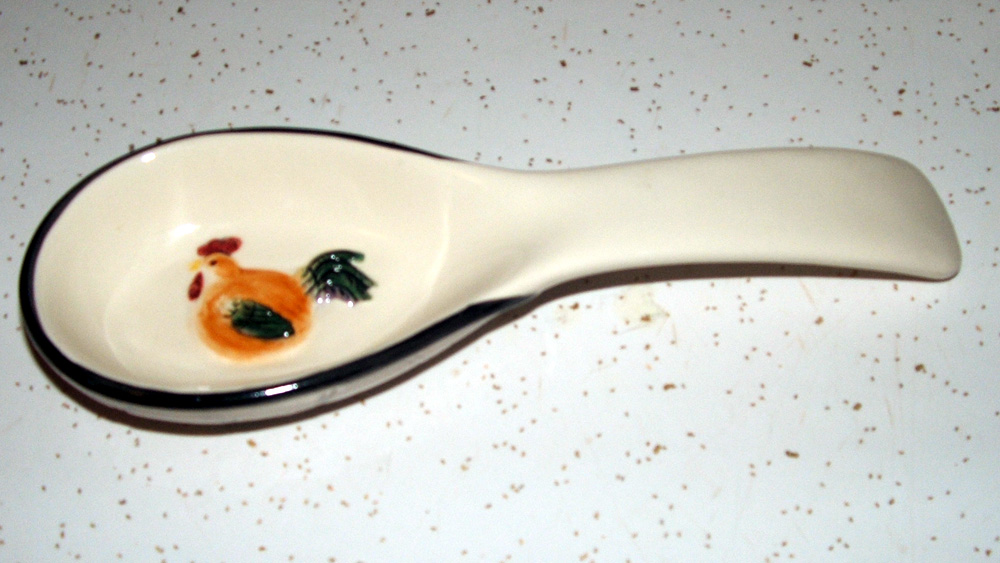
Spoon rest

A spoon rest (also known as a dublé) is a piece of kitchenware that serves as a place to lay spoons and other cooking utensils, to prevent cooking fluids from getting onto countertops, as well as keeping the spoon from touching any contaminants that might be on the counter. It is easier to keep the rest clean than the countertop.

A typical design of a spoon rest is that of an "oversized spoon" with a shallow bowl and a notch on a side or an oversized ladle on feet (so called ladle rest). The rests are made of many materials, including wood, plastic, ceramic, stainless steel.

== See also ==
- Spoon and chopstick rest
