= Approximate measures =

Unregulated volume units still in use

Approximate measures are units of volumetric measurement which are not defined by a government or government-sanctioned organization, or which were previously defined and are now repealed, yet which remain in use.

It may be that all English-unit derived capacity measurements are derived from one original approximate measurement: the mouthful, consisting of about 1/2 ounce, called the ro in ancient Egypt (their smallest recognized unit of capacity). The mouthful was still a unit of liquid measure during Elizabethan times. (The principal Egyptian standards from small to large were the ro, hin, hekat, and khar.)

Because of the lack of official definitions, many of these units will not have a consistent value.

== United Kingdom ==
- glass-tumbler
- breakfast-cup
- tea-cup
- wine-glass
- table-spoon
- dessert-spoon
- tea-spoon
- black-jack
- demijohn (dame-jeanne)
- goblet
- pitcher
- gyllot (about equal to 1/2 gill)
- noggin (1/4 pint)
- nipperkin (measure for liquor, containing no more than 1/2 pint)
- tumblerful (10 fl oz or 2 gills or 2 teacupsful)
- apothecaries' approximate measures
  - teacupful = about 4 fl oz
  - wineglassful = about 2 fl oz
  - tablespoonful = about 1/2 fl oz
  - dessertspoonful = about 2 fl dr
  - teaspoonful = about 1 fl dr
  - drop = about minim
- teacupful (5 fl oz, or 1 gill ibid)
- wineglassful (2-1/2 fl oz or 1/2 gill or 1/2 teacupful or 1/4 tumblerful)
- dessertspoonful (1/4 fl oz or 2 fl dr and equal to 2 teaspoonful or 1/2 tablespoonful)
- teaspoonful (1/8 fl oz or 1 fl dr and also equal to 1/2 dessertspoonful or 1/4 tablespoonful)

== United States ==
The vagueness of how these measures have been defined, redefined, and undefined over the years, both through written and oral history, is best exemplified by the large number of sources that need to be read and cross-referenced in order to paint even a reasonably accurate picture. So far, the list includes the United States Pharmacopoeia, U.S. FDA, NIST, A Manual of Weights, Measures, and Specific Gravity, State Board Questions and Answers, MediCalc, MacKenzie's Ten Thousand Receipts, Approximate Practical Equivalents, When is a Cup not a Cup?, Cook's Info, knitting-and.com., and Modern American Drinks.

Dashes, pinches, and smidgens are all traditionally very small amounts well under a teaspoon, but not more uniformly defined. In the early 2000s some companies began selling measuring spoons that defined a dash as 1/8 teaspoon, a pinch as 1/16 teaspoon, and a smidgen as 1/32 teaspoon. Based on these spoons, there are two smidgens in a pinch and two pinches in a dash. However, the 1954 Angostura “Professional Mixing Guide” states that “a dash” is 1/6th of a teaspoon, or 1/48 of an ounce, and Victor Bergeron (a.k.a. Trader Vic, famous saloonkeeper), said that for bitters it was 1/8 teaspoon, but 1/4 fl oz for all other liquids.

Fluid Measures
Unit	Abbrev.	Definition 1 (c. 1885)	Definition 2 (c. 1905)	Definition 3 (c. 1975)	Definition 4 (c. 2015)	Traditional Binary Submultiple Fl. Oz.	Binary Submultiples
hint					1/128 tsp	1/1024	2 hints = 1 drop
drop	dr., gt., gtt.	1/8 to 1 1/2 minim or 5 centigrams			1/64 tsp	1/512	2 drops = 1 smidgen
smidgen	smdg., smi.				1/32 tsp	1/256	2 smidgens = 1 pinch
pinch	pn.	1/8 tsp			1/16 tsp	1/128	2 pinches = 1 dash
dash	ds.				1/8 tsp	1/64	2 dashes = 1 saltspoon
saltspoon (scruple-spoon, tad)	ssp., sp., scrsp.				1/4 tsp	1/32	2 saltspoons = 1 coffeespoon
coffeespoon (barspoon)	bsp.				1/2 tsp	1/16	2 coffeespoons = 1 teaspoon
teaspoon (kitchen spoon, splash)	tsp. or t.	1 fluid dram or 5 mL most common size: 80 minims or 3 mL	1 fluidrachm or 4 mL, or 3.75 mL (actual range: 4.6–5.5 mL)	1/3 tablespoon or 1/6 fl oz	1 fl dram or 5 mL, 1/6 fl oz, 1 1/3 fl dr	1/8	2 teaspoons = 1 dessertspoon
dessertspoon	dsp., dssp. or dstspn.	2 fluid drams or 10 mL most common size: 2 1/2 fl dr or 10 mL	2 fluidrachm or 8 mL, or 7.5 mL (actual range: 8.4–10.4 mL)		2 fl dram or 8 mL	1/4	2 dessertspoons = 1 tablespoon
tablespoon (mouthful)	tbsp. or T., rarely tbls.	1/2 fluid ounce or 20 mL most common size: 5 fl dr or 20 mL	4 fluidrachm or 16 mL, or 15 mL (actual range: 12.8–15.6 mL)		1/2 fl oz or 15 mL	1/2	2 tablespoons = 1 handful
handful (fluid ounce, finger)	m. (for manipulus)				1 fl oz	1	2 handfuls = 1 wineglass
wineglass (glassful)	wgf.,	2 fluid ounces or 60 mL, w-gl.				2	2 wineglasses = 1 teacup
teacup	tcf.	4 fluid ounces				4	2 teacups = 1 coffeecup
coffeecup (tumbler, kitchencup)					8 fluid ounces	8	2 coffeecups = 1 jug
jug (pint)						16	2 jugfuls = 1 pitcher
pitcher (quart)	ptch.					32	2 pitchers = 1 pottle
