= Elizabeth Tookey =

British artist

Elizabeth Tookey (died 1773?) was an English silversmith.

Tookey was married to James Tookey, a spoon maker and plateworker, and herself became a silversmith after his death, although the date at which her mark was registered is unknown. Her address in London was given as Silver Street; her classification, like that of her husband, was given as spoonmaker. She is presumed to have been the mother of Thomas Tookey; her name appeared alone in the 1773 Parliamentary Report list. In October of that year Thomas appears to have taken over the family business. Elizabeth's will was proved on 29 October the same year.

A strainer spoon by Tookey is in the collection of the Metropolitan Museum of Art. Several pieces attributed to her are owned by the National Museum of Women in the Arts, including a set of four George II dessert spoons, dated 1740; a pair of George II tablespoons, dated to the same year; and a George III tablespoon, date 1771. A set of tablespoons by Tookey, along with a ladle and set of teaspoons by her husband, were among the pieces of silver owned by Bathurst Skelton that his wife brought with her at her marriage to Thomas Jefferson, and are today on display at Monticello.
