= Cooking weights and measures =

Specifications for quantities of ingredients

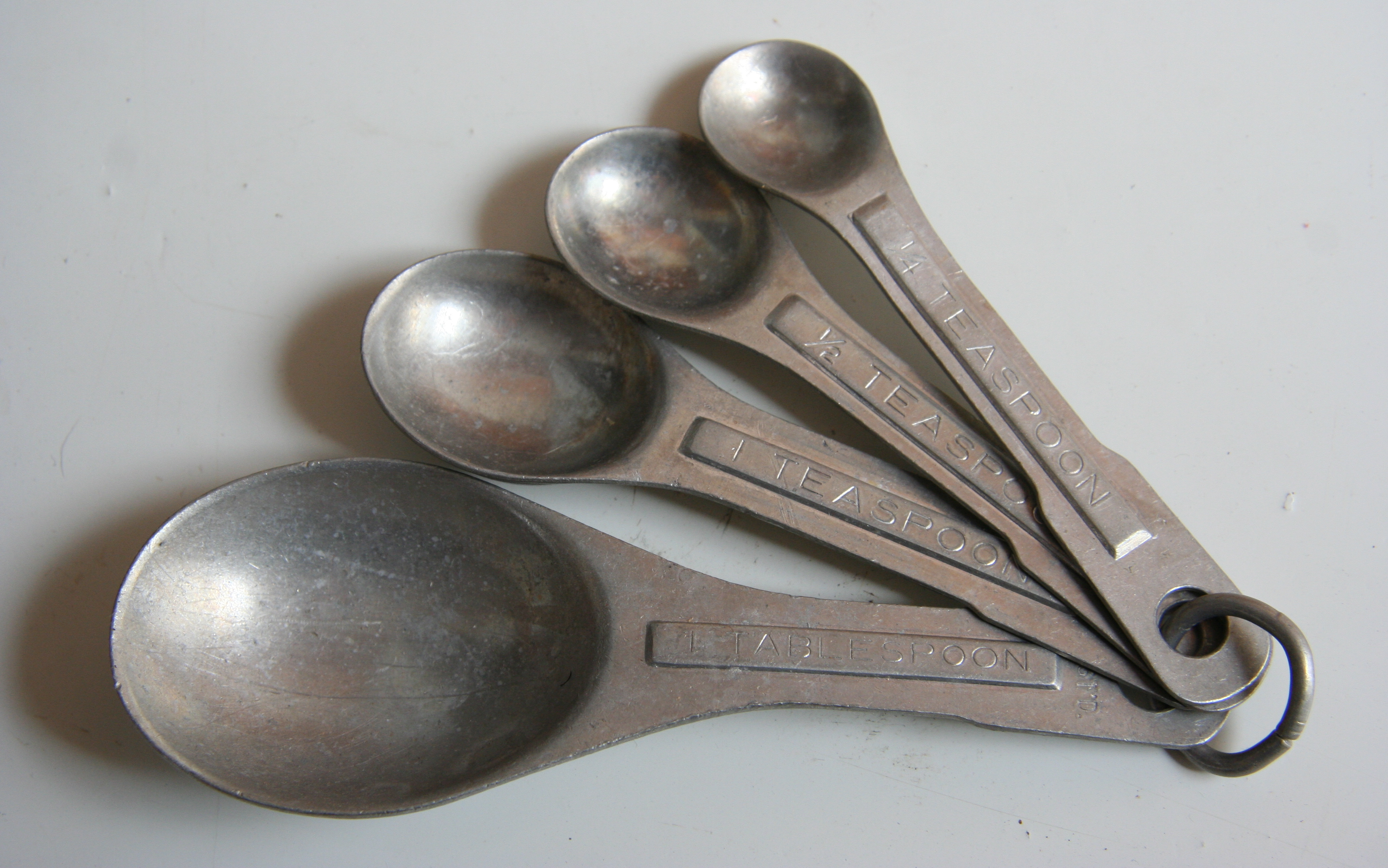
Measuring spoons (customary units) – 1 tablespoon, 1 teaspoon, 1/2 teaspoon, 1/4 teaspoon

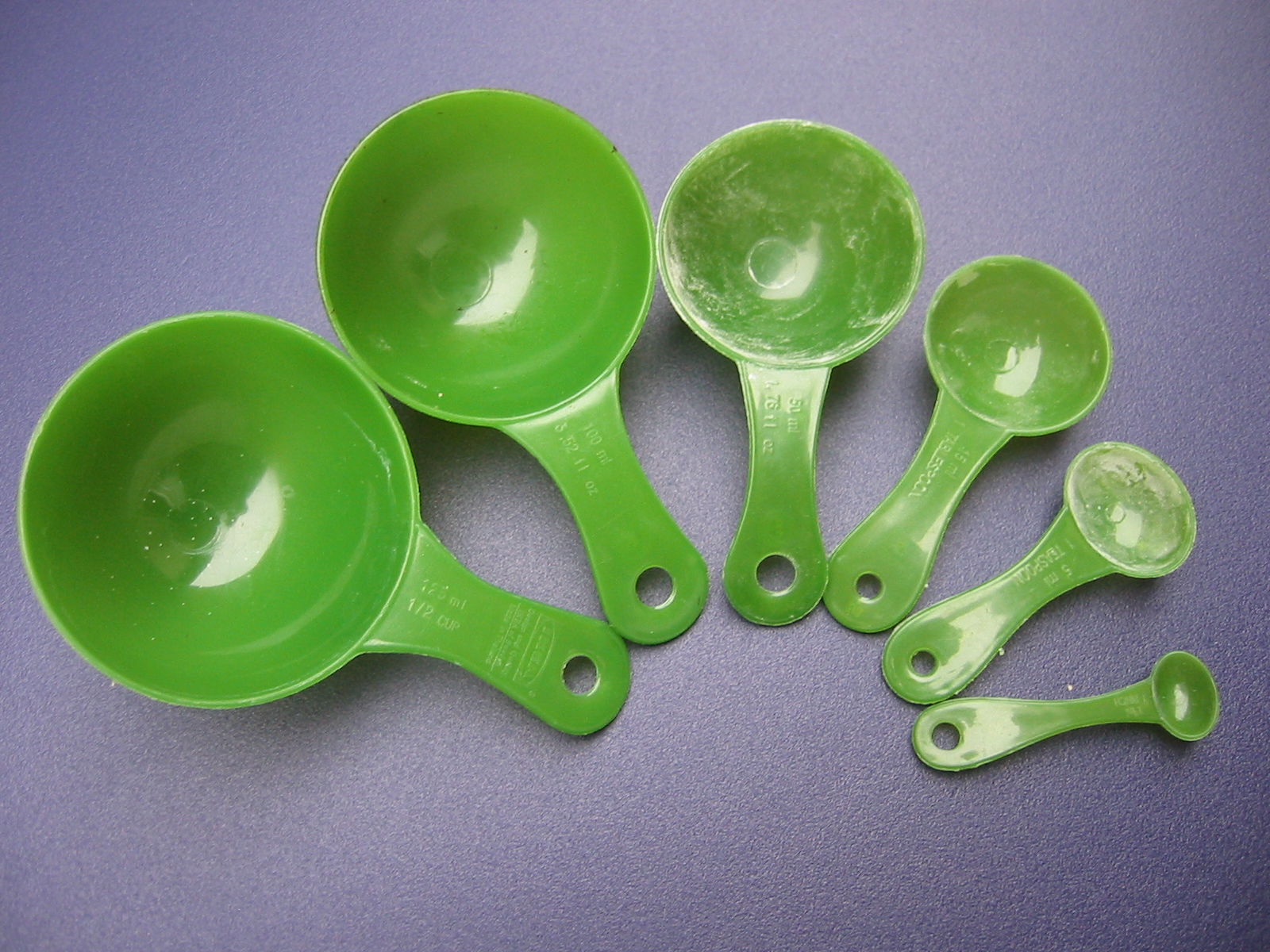
Measuring spoons (metric) – 1 mL, 5 mL, 15 mL, 50 mL, 100 mL, 125 mL

In recipes, quantities of ingredients may be specified by mass (commonly called weight), by volume, or by count.

For most of history, most cookbooks did not specify quantities precisely, instead talking of "a nice leg of spring lamb", a "cupful" of lentils, a piece of butter "the size of a small apricot", and "sufficient" salt. Informal measurements such as a "pinch", a "drop", or a "hint" (soupçon) continue to be used from time to time. In the US, Fannie Farmer introduced the more exact specification of quantities by volume in her 1896 Boston Cooking-School Cook Book.

Today, most of the world prefers metric measurement by weight, though the preference for volume measurements continues among home cooks in the United States and the rest of North America. Different ingredients are measured in different ways:

Liquid ingredients are generally measured by volume worldwide.

Dry bulk ingredients, such as sugar and flour, are measured by weight in most of the world ("250 g flour"), and by volume in North America ("1/2 cup flour"). Small quantities of salt and spices are generally measured by volume worldwide, as few households have sufficiently precise balances to measure by weight.

In most countries, meat is described by weight or count: "a 2 kilogram chicken"; "four lamb chops".

Eggs are usually specified by count. Vegetables are usually specified by weight or occasionally by count, despite the inherent imprecision of counts given the variability in the size of vegetables.

== Metric measures ==
In most of the world, recipes use the metric system of units—litres (L) and millilitres (mL), grams (g) and kilograms (kg), and degrees Celsius (°C). The official spelling litre is used in most English-speaking nations. The notable exception is the United States where the spelling liter is preferred.

The United States measures weight in pounds (avoirdupois). Recipes in the UK tend to include both imperial and metric measures, following the advice of the Guild of Food Writers. The United States also uses volume measures based on cooking utensils and pre-metric measures. The actual values frequently deviate from the utensils on which they were based, and there is little consistency from one country to another.

Common volume measures in millilitres (English-speaking countries)
Measure	AU	NZ	UK	CA	CFIA (CA)	FDA (US)	US
Teaspoon	5*		5 or ≈3.55^{§}	5*			≈ 4.93
Dessertspoon	10	—	≈7.10^{§}	—	—	—	≈ 9.86
Tablespoon	20	15*	15 or ≈14.21^{§}	15*			≈ 14.79
Fluid ounce	≈ 28.41				—	30	≈ 29.57
Cup	250		≈ 170.48	≈ 227.31^{‡}	250	240	≈ 236.59
Pint	570^{†}	≈ 568.26			—	—	≈ 473.18
Quart	≈ 1136.52				—	—	≈ 946.35
Gallon	≈ 4546.09				—	—	≈ 3785.41

^{†} In South Australia, a "pint" of beer is traditionally 425 mL, while most other states have metricated this value to 570 mL.
^{‡} In Canada, a cup was historically 8 imperial fluid ounces (227 mL) but could also refer to 10 imperial fl oz (284 mL), as in Britain, and even a metric cup of 250 mL. Serving sizes on nutrition labelling on food packages in Canada employ the metric cup of 250 mL, with nutrition labelling in the US using a cup of 240 mL, based on the US customary cup.
* In Canada, a teaspoon is historically 1/6 imperial fluid ounce (4.74 mL) and a tablespoon is 1/2 imperial fl oz (14.21 mL). In Canada, cooking utensils commonly come in 5 mL for teaspoons and 15 mL for tablespoons.
^{§} In the UK, teaspoons and tablespoons are formally 1/160 and 1/40 of an imperial pint (3.55 mL and 14.21 mL), respectively, with 1tbsp being equal to 2 dessert spoons or 4tsp. Cooking utensils are now commonly manufactured at 15 mL for tablespoons, and either 1 metric teaspoon (5ml) or a compromise measurement (such as 4ml) for teaspoons. Metric dessertspoons are not commonly used in the UK.

The volume measures here are for comparison only. See below for the definition of Gallon for more details.

The "cook's cup" above is not the same as a "coffee cup", which can vary anywhere from 100 to 200 mL (3.5 to 7.0 imp fl oz; 3.4 to 6.8 US fl oz), or even smaller for espresso.

In Australia, since 1970, metric utensil units have been standardized by law, and imperial measures no longer have legal status. It is wise to measure the actual volume of the utensil measures, particularly the 'Australian tablespoon' (see above), since many are imported from other countries with different values. Dessertspoons are standardized as part of the metric system at 10 mL, though they are not normally used in contemporary recipes. Australia is the only metricated country with a metric tablespoon of 20 mL, unlike other countries that metricated, which have a 15 mL metric tablespoon.

In Europe, older recipes frequently refer to "pounds" (e.g. Pfund in German, pond in Dutch, livre in French). In each case, the unit refers to 500 g, about 10% more than an avoirdupois pound (454 g). Dutch recipes may also use the ons, which is 100 g.

== Weight of liquids ==
Density of common ingredients, very roughly
Ingredient	Density (g/mL or av.oz./fl.oz.)
Sugar	0.8
Flour	0.7
Salt	1.2
Butter	0.9

With the advent of accurate electronic scales, it has become more common to weigh liquids for use in recipes, avoiding the need for accurate volumetric utensils. The most common liquids used in cooking are water and milk, milk having approximately the same density as water.

1 mL of water weighs 1 gram, so a recipe calling for 300 mL (≈ 1/2 Imperial Pint) of water can simply be substituted with 300 g (≈ 10 oz.) of water.

1 fluid ounce of water weighs approximately 1 ounce, so a recipe calling for a UK pint (20 fl oz) of water can be substituted with 20 oz of water.

More accurate measurements become important in the large volumes used in commercial food production. Also, a home cook can use greater precision at times. Water at 4.0 °C (39.2 °F) may be volumetrically measured then weighed to determine an unknown measuring-utensil volume without the need for a water-density adjustment.

== United States measures ==
The US uses pounds and ounces (avoirdupois) for weight, and US customary units for volume. For measures used in cookbooks published in other nations navigate to the appropriate regional section in Traditional measurement systems.

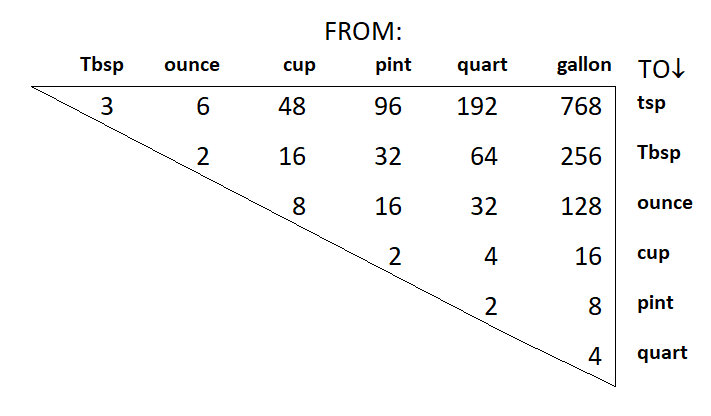
Ratios among the larger and smaller US cooking volumetric measures.

Measures are classified as either dry measures or fluid measures. Some of the fluid and dry measures have similar names, but the actual measured volume is quite different. A recipe will generally specify which measurement is required. U.S. recipes are commonly in terms of fluid measures, even for dry ingredients. Most of these units derive from earlier English units, as applied to the U.S. gallon. Typically they follow a pattern of binary submultiples, where each larger measure consists of two units of the next-smallest measure. An exception is with the commonly used teaspoon as one-third of a tablespoon.

Binary submultiples are fractional parts obtained by successively dividing by the number 2. Thus, one-half, one-fourth, one-eighth, one-sixteenth, and so on, are binary submultiples. The system can be traced back to the measuring systems of the Hindus and the ancient Egyptians, who subdivided the hekat (about 4.8 litres) into parts of 1/2, 1/4,1/8, 1/16, 1/32, and 1/64 (1 ro, or mouthful, or about 14.5 ml), and the hin similarly down to 1/32 (1 ro) using hieratic notation, as early as the Fifth Dynasty of Egypt, 2494 to 2345 BC, thus making the "English doubling system" at least 4,300 years old.

From units and tools of convenience, most of the system's history could have values vary widely. It was not until recent centuries that standardization began to take shape. The overlap with other systems – like the apothecaries' system, and giving each 1/2 division a unique – and often variable by context, person, place, and time – name instead of a systematic one, can make the system seem confusing for those not accustomed to it.

Other than the names themselves, the regular ratios make the actual measurements straightforward. In many cases, names have been deprecated in favor of fractionally denominated amounts of a few core units (such as taking gallons, cups, and teaspoons to their nearest quarters without names: nixing pottle; gill and wineglass; dram (as a culinary unit), coffeespoon, and saltspoon; respectively), or are limited to the specific or esoteric.

It is still a legal basis for measures in many states, such as Massachusetts, which mandates that "Glass bottles or jars used for the sale of milk or cream to the consumer shall be of the capacity of one gallon, a multiple of the gallon, or a binary submultiple of the gallon."

Metric equivalents are based upon one of two nearly equivalent systems. In the standard system the conversion is that 1 gallon = 231 cubic inches and 1 inch = 2.54 cm, which makes a gallon = 3785.411784 millilitres exactly. For nutritional labeling on food packages in the US, the teaspoon is defined as exactly 5 ml, giving 1 gallon = 3840 ml exactly. This chart uses the former.

Dry and fluid measures
Unit	Abbrev.	Defined	fl oz	mL (Note: Milliliter values based on fluid ounces by Google Units Converter.)	Binary submultiples
drop	dr., gt., gtt. (plural)	1/96 tsp	1/576	0.0513429	
smidgen	smdg., smi.	1/32 tsp*	1/256	0.115522	2 smidgens = 1 pinch
pinch	pn.	1/16 tsp*	1/128	0.231043	2 pinches = 1 dash
dash	ds.	1/8 tsp*	1/64	0.462086	2 dashes = 1 saltspoon
saltspoon‡ or scruple†	ssp.	1/4 tsp*	1/32†	0.924173†	2 saltspoons = 1 coffeespoon
coffeespoon‡	csp.	1/2 tsp*	1/16	1.84835	2 coffeespoons = 1 teaspoon
Fluid dram (Note: The bartender's teaspoon was once a widely used unit of Apothecaries' measure, it is equal to 1 fluid dram (or drachm).)	fl.dr.	3/4 tsp	1/8	3.69669	~~2 fluid drams = 1 dessertspoon (Australia)~~
teaspoon (culinary) (Note: The U.S. customary teaspoon is exactly 1 1/3 US fluid drams.)	tsp. or t.	1/3 tbsp	1/6	4.92892	2 teaspoons = 1 dessertspoon
dessertspoon‡	dsp., dssp. or dstspn.	2 tsp	1/3	9.85784	
tablespoon	tbsp. or T.	1/16 cup	1/2	14.7868	2 tablespoons = 1 fluid ounce
fluid ounce	fl.oz. or oz.	1/8 cup	1	29.5735	2 fluid ounces = 1 wineglass
wineglass‡	wgf.	1/4 cup	2	59.1471	2 wineglasses = 1 teacup
gill‡ or teacup‡	tcf.	1/2 cup	4	118.294	2 teacups = 1 cup
cup	C	1/2 pint	8	236.588	2 cups = 1 pint
pint	pt.	1/2 qt	16	473.176	2 pints = 1 quart
quart	qt.	1/4 gal	32	946.353	2 quarts = 1 pottle‡
gallon	gal.	231 in^{3}	128	3,785.41	4 quarts = 1 gal

Suffixed asterisks on some of the "tsp" units in the "Defined" column above indicate that those teaspoon units are defined as 1/8 fl oz (4 fl dram), the old 4 tsp = 1 tbsp amount, instead of 1/6 fl oz. This definition fits with "barkeepers' teaspoon", and is used in many cocktail recipe books. Generally the subdivisions are not so explicitly defined nor named below 1/4 tsp in general culinary. This can be verified by comparing the associated values in the "fl oz" column. All other "tsp" units in the "Defined" column are indeed defined as 1/6 fl oz, the current 3 tsp = 1 tbsp amount.

* Discrepancies due to size, generally disregarded as at the scale it becomes a factor, the person generally is using the next size up measuring cup (i.e.: 1 1/2 fl oz is likely to be straight measured in an ounce cup and not as 9 (vs 12) teaspoons)

‡ Rare if not nonexistent in use by name rather than as fraction of a different unit.

† The fluid scruple has been properly defined on its own in the apothecaries' system as 1/24 fl oz, 1/3 fluid dram, or = 20 minims (≈ 1.23223 ml), and also 1/4 tsp. Mind that scruples and drams were pharmaceutical and intended to be specific and precise. Cooking measures tended to use what was on hand and/or actually used to consume what was being prepared, and not intended to be as formally scientific in its degree of precision.

The saltspoon most likely combined into the scruple over time, as a consequence of home cooks approximating standard measures with what they had at hand, much as the teaspoon was roughly "close enough" for a kitchen approximation to a fluid dram (= 60 minims), but not equal to the 1 1/3 fl dr (80 minims) value it actually is. Especially with the variability of the method of measuring itself. Not of insignificance is the natural habit of customary measures to use a 2^{n} dividing scheme regardless of exact definitions. This pattern is seen even with metric measuring spoons.

Confusion comes about from teaspoon continuing to be called a "dram" in vernacular, despite the sizes of actual spoons creeping up quietly over time, such that 1/4 of a tsp (tsp > fl dr) would in fact become congruent with current 1/3 fl dr values for the scruple and saltspoon. In other words, the terminology not keeping pace with the definition. At the small scales involved this is negligible (i.e.: math can convert down to tsp ×10^{−9}, but to what degree can it practically be meted).

However, it can cause problems when accuracy is required such as medicines: "In almost all cases the modern teacups, tablespoons, dessertspoons, and teaspoons, after careful test by the author, were found to average 25 percent greater capacity than the theoretical quantities given above, and thus the use of accurately graduated medicine glasses, which may be had now at a trifling cost, should be insisted upon."

Units with respect to the teaspoon as defined and "dram-teaspoon" (defined values in bold)
			teaspoon		dram-teaspoon		
Unit	Abbr.	defined in tsp	minims	ml	minims	ml	Notes
Fluid Ounce	fl oz, f℥	6 tsp*/ 8 fl dr	**480**	29.57	**480**	29.57	
Tablespoon	Tbsp	3 tsp*/ 4 fl dr	**240**	14.79	**240**	14.79	1 Tbsp = 3 tsp*
Dessertspoon	dsp	2 tsp	160	9.858	120	7.393	1 dsp = 2 tsp
**Teaspoon**	**tsp**	**1 tsp**	**80**	4.929	60	3.697	1 tsp = 2 csp
Fluid Dram	fl dr, fʒ	3/4 tsp / 1 tsp	**60**	3.697	**60**	3.697	= 1/8 fl oz
Coffeespoon	csp	1/2 tsp	40	2.464	30	1.848	1 csp = 2 ssp
Fluid Scruple	f℈	1/4 tsp	**20**	1.232	**20**	1.232	= 1/24 fl oz
Saltspoon	ssp	1/4 tsp	20	1.232	15	0.9242	1 ssp = 2 ds
Dash	ds	1/8 tsp	10	0.6161	7 1/2	0.4621	1 ds = 2 pn
Pinch	pn	1/16 tsp	5	0.3081	3 3/4	0.2310	1 pn = 2 smdg
Smidgeon	smdg	1/32 tsp	2 1/2	0.1540	1 7/8	0.1155	
Minim	min, ɱ	1/80 tsp	**1**	0.0616	**1**	0.616	= 1/480 fl oz
Drop	dr., gt., gtt.	1/96 tsp	5/6	0.0513	5/6	.0513	= 1/576 fl oz

* Discrepancies due to size, generally disregarded as at the scale it becomes a factor, the person generally is using the next size up measuring cup. i.e.: 1 1/2 fl oz is likely to be straight measured in an ounce cup and not as 9 (vs 12) teaspoons.

In domestic cooking, bulk solids, notably flour and sugar, are measured by volume, often cups, though they are sold by weight at retail. Weight measures are used for meat. Butter may be measured by either weight (1/4 lb) or volume (3 tbsp) or a combination of weight and volume (1/4 lb plus 3 tbsp). It is sold by weight but in packages marked to facilitate common divisions by eye.

As a sub-packaged unit, a stick of butter, at 1/4 lb [113 g], is a de facto measure in the US. Some recipes may specify butter amounts called a pat (1–1.5 tsp) or a knob (2 tbsp).

Cookbooks in Canada use the same system, although pints and gallons would be taken as their Imperial quantities unless specified otherwise. Following the adoption of the metric system, recipes in Canada are frequently published with metric conversions.

=== Approximate units ===
There are a variety of approximate units of measures, which are frequently undefined by any official source, or which have had conflicting definitions over time, yet which are commonly used. The measurement units that are most commonly understood to be approximate are the drop, smidgen, pinch, and dash, yet nearly all of the traditional cooking measurement units lack statutory definitions, or even any definition by any organization authorized to set standards in the U.S.

For example, of the table above, only the fluid ounce, pint, quart, and gallon are officially defined by the NIST. All of the others appear only in conversion guides lacking statutory authority, or in now-obsolete publications of the U.S. Pharmacopeial Convention, or USP—essentially, the Apothecaries' system—which still has authority to define certain drug and supplement standards. The USP has long-since abandoned Apothecaries' measurements, and even now recommends against using teaspoons to measure doses of medicine.

== British (Imperial) measures ==
Note that measurements in this section are in imperial units.

British imperial measures distinguish between weight and volume.

Weight is measured in ounces and pounds (avoirdupois) as in the U.S.

Volume is measured in imperial gallons, quarts, pints, fluid ounces, fluid drachms, and minims. The imperial gallon was originally defined as 10 pounds (4.5359 kg) of water in 1824, and refined as exactly 4.54609 litres in 1985.

Traditionally, when describing volumes, recipes commonly give measurements in the following units:

- Tumbler (10 fluid ounces; named after a typical drinking glass)
- Breakfast cup (8 fluid ounces; named after a cup for drinking tea or coffee while eating breakfast)
- Cup (6 fluid ounces; named after an everyday drinking cup)
- Teacup (5 fluid ounces; named after a typical teacup)
- Coffee cup (2 1/2 fluid ounces; named after a small cup for serving after‑dinner coffee)
- Wine glass (2 fluid ounces; named after a small glass for serving liquor)

If the recipe is one that has been handed down in a family and gives measurements in ‘cups’, it is just as likely to refer to someone's favourite kitchen cup as to the said unit that is 6 fluid ounces.

All six units are the traditional British equivalents of the US customary cup and the metric cup, used in situations where a US cook would use the US customary cup and a cook using metric units the metric cup. The breakfast cup is the most similar in size to the US customary cup and the metric cup. Which of these six units is used depends on the quantity or volume of the ingredient: there is division of labour between these six units, like the tablespoon and the teaspoon.

British cookery books and recipes, especially those from the days before the UK's partial metrication, commonly use two or more of the aforesaid units simultaneously. For example, the same recipe may call for a ‘tumblerful’ of one ingredient and a ‘wineglassful’ of another one. Or a ‘breakfastcupful’ or ‘cupful’ of one ingredient, a ‘teacupful’ of a second one, and a ‘coffeecupful’ of a third one.

Unlike the US customary cup and the metric cup, a tumbler, a breakfast cup, a cup, a teacup, a coffee cup, and a wine glass are not measuring cups. They are simply everyday drinking vessels commonly found in British households and typically having the respective aforementioned capacities. Due to long-term and widespread use, they have been transformed into measurement units for cooking. There is not a British imperial unit–based culinary measuring cup.

For smaller amounts, British recipes traditionally give measurements in the following units:

- Tablespoon (4 fluid drachms or 1/2 fluid ounce)
- Dessert spoon (1/2 tablespoon: the equivalence of 2 fluid drachms or 1/4 fluid ounce)
- Teaspoon (1/2 dessert spoon or 1/4 tablespoon: the equivalence of 1 fluid drachm or 1/8 fluid ounce)
- Salt spoon (1/2 teaspoon: the equivalence of 30 minims, 1/2 fluid drachm, or 1/16 fluid ounce)

For even smaller amounts, the following units are used:

- Pinch (1/2 salt spoon or 1/4 teaspoon: an amount of space that can accommodate 15 minims (1/4 fluid drachm or 1/32 fluid ounce) of liquid), if it is a dry ingredient
- Drop (1 minim, 1/60 fluid drachm, or 1/480 fluid ounce), if it is a liquid

Table of volume units
Unit	Fluid ounces	Pints	Millilitres	Cubic inches	US fluid ounces	US pints
fluid ounce (fl oz)	1	1/20	28.4130625	1.7339	0.96076	0.060047
gill	5	1/4	142.0653125	8.6694	4.8038	0.30024
pint (pt)	20	1	568.26125	34.677	19.215	1.2009
quart (qt)	40	2	1,136.5225	69.355	38.430	2.4019
gallon (gal)	160	8	4,546.09	277.42	153.72	9.6076
Note: The millilitre figures are exact whereas the cubic-inch and US measure figures are to five significant digits.
Note 2: The imperial gallon is equal to 10 lbs of water.

Conversion table for drinking vessel–based British culinary measurement units and their metric and US customary equivalents
1 tumbler	1 breakfast cup	1 cup	1 teacup	1 coffee cup	1 wine glass
10 fluid ounces / 1/2 pint	8 fluid ounces / 2/5 pint	6 fluid ounces / 3/10 pint	5 fluid ounces / 1/4 pint	2 1/2 fluid ounces / 1/8 pint	2 fluid ounces / 1/10 pint
1 1/4 breakfast cups	4/5 tumbler	3/5 tumbler	1/2 tumbler	1/4 tumbler	1/5 tumbler
1 2/3 cups	1 1/3 cups	3/4 breakfast cup	5/8 breakfast cup	5/16 breakfast cup	1/4 breakfast cup
2 teacups	1 3/5 teacups	1 1/5 teacups	5/6 cup	5/12 cup	1/3 cup
4 coffee cups	3 1/5 coffee cups	2 2/5 coffee cups	2 coffee cups	1/2 teacup	2/5 teacup
5 wine glasses	4 wine glasses	3 wine glasses	2 1/2 wine glasses	1 1/4 wine glasses	4/5 coffee cup
≈ 284.13 millilitres	≈ 227.3 millilitres	≈ 170.48 millilitres	≈ 142.07 millilitres	≈ 71.03 millilitres	≈ 56.83 millilitres
≈ 1.14 metric cups	≈ 0.91 metric cup	≈ 0.68 metric cup	≈ 0.57 metric cup	≈ 0.28 metric cup	≈ 0.23 metric cup
≈ 9.61 US customary fluid ounces	≈ 7.69 US customary fluid ounces	≈ 5.76 US customary fluid ounces	≈ 4.8 US customary fluid ounces	≈ 2.4 US customary fluid ounces	≈ 1.92 US customary fluid ounces
≈ 1.2 US customary cups	≈ 0.96 US customary cup	≈ 0.72 US customary cup	≈ 0.6 US customary cup	≈ 0.3 US customary cup	≈ 0.24 US customary cup

Conversion table for spoon‑based British culinary measurement units and their metric and US customary equivalents
1 tablespoon	1 dessert spoon	1 teaspoon	1 salt spoon
4 fluid drachms / 1/2 fluid ounce	2 fluid drachms / 1/4 fluid ounce	1 fluid drachm / 1/8 fluid ounce	1/2 fluid drachm / 1/16 fluid ounce
2 dessert spoons	1/2 tablespoon	1/4 tablespoon	1/8 tablespoon
4 teaspoons	2 teaspoons	1/2 dessert spoon	1/4 dessert spoon
8 salt spoons	4 salt spoons	2 salt spoons	1/2 teaspoon
16 pinches (solids only)	8 pinches (solids only)	4 pinches (solids only)	2 pinches (solids only)
240 drops (liquids only)	120 drops (liquids only)	60 drops (liquids only)	30 drops (liquids only)
≈ 14.21 millilitres	≈ 7.1 millilitres	≈ 3.55 millilitres	≈ 1.78 millilitres
≈ 0.95 international metric tablespoon	≈ 0.47 international metric tablespoon	≈ 0.24 international metric tablespoon	≈ 0.11 international metric tablespoon
≈ 0.71 Australian metric tablespoon	≈ 0.36 Australian metric tablespoon	≈ 0.18 Australian metric tablespoon	≈ 0.09 Australian metric tablespoon
≈ 1.42 metric dessert spoons	≈ 0.71 metric dessert spoon	≈ 0.36 metric dessert spoon	≈ 0.18 metric dessert spoon
≈ 2.84 metric teaspoons	≈ 1.42 metric teaspoons	≈ 0.71 metric teaspoon	≈ 0.36 metric teaspoon
≈ 3.84 US customary fluid drams / 0.48 US customary fluid ounce	≈ 1.92 US customary fluid drams / 0.24 US customary fluid ounce	≈ 0.96 US customary fluid dram / 0.12 US customary fluid ounce	≈ 0.48 US customary fluid dram / 0.06 US customary fluid ounce
≈ 0.96 US customary tablespoon	≈ 0.48 US customary tablespoon	≈ 0.24 US customary tablespoon	≈ 0.12 US customary tablespoon
≈ 1.44 US customary dessert spoons	≈ 0.72 US customary dessert spoon	≈ 0.36 US customary dessert spoon	≈ 0.18 US customary dessert spoon
≈ 2.88 US customary teaspoons	≈ 1.44 US customary teaspoons	≈ 0.72 US customary teaspoon	≈ 0.36 US customary teaspoon
≈ 5.76 US customary coffee spoons	≈ 2.88 US customary coffee spoons	≈ 1.44 US customary coffee spoons	≈ 0.72 US customary coffee spoon
≈ 11.53 US customary salt spoons	≈ 5.76 US customary salt spoons	≈ 2.88 US customary salt spoons	≈ 1.44 US customary salt spoon
≈ 23.06 US customary dashes (solids only)	≈ 11.53 US customary dashes (solids only)	≈ 5.76 US customary dashes (solids only)	≈ 2.88 US customary dashes (solids only)
≈ 46.12 US customary pinches (solids only)	≈ 23.06 US customary pinches (solids only)	≈ 11.53 US customary pinches (solids only)	≈ 5.76 US customary pinches (solids only)
≈ 92.23 US customary smidgens (solids only)	≈ 46.12 US customary smidgens (solids only)	≈ 23.06 US customary smidgens (solids only)	≈ 11.53 US customary smidgens (solids only)
≈ 276.7 US customary drops (liquids only)	≈ 138.35 US customary drops (liquids only)	≈ 69.17 US customary drops (liquids only)	≈ 34.59 US customary drops (liquids only)

Conversion table for the pinch and their metric and US customary equivalents
1 pinch
An amount of a solid occupying an amount of space that can accommodate 15 minims (1/4 fluid drachm or 1/32 fluid ounce) of liquid
1/2 salt spoon or 1/4 teaspoon
≈ An amount of a solid occupying an amount of space that can accommodate 0.89 millilitre of liquid
≈ 0.178 metric teaspoon
≈ An amount of a solid occupying an amount of space that can accommodate 14.41 US customary minims (0.24 US customary fluid dram or 0.03 US customary fluid ounce) of liquid
≈ 0.18 US customary teaspoon / 0.36 US customary coffee spoon / 0.72 US customary salt spoon
≈ 1.44 US customary dashes
≈ 2.88 US customary pinches
≈ 5.76 US customary smidgens

Conversion table for the drop and their metric and US customary equivalents
1 drop
1 minim / 1/60 fluid drachm / 1/480 fluid ounce
1/30 salt spoon / 1/60 teaspoon
≈ 0.059 millilitre
≈ 0.0118 metric teaspoon
≈ 0.96 US customary minim / 0.016 US customary fluid dram / 0.002 US customary fluid ounce
≈ 0.012 US customary teaspoon / 0.024 US customary coffee spoon / 0.033 US customary salt spoon
≈ 1.15 US customary drops

American cooks using British recipes, and vice versa, need to be careful with pints and fluid ounces. A US pint (16 US fluid ounces) is about 16.65 UK fluid ounces or 473 mL. A UK pint is 20 UK fluid ounces (about 19.21 US fluid ounces or 568 mL). A UK pint is about 20% larger than a US pint.

A US fluid ounce is 1/16 of a US pint (about 1.04 UK fluid ounces or 29.6 mL). A UK fluid ounce is 1/20 of a UK pint (about 0.96 US fluid ounce or 28.4 mL).

On a larger scale, perhaps for institutional cookery, a UK gallon is 8 UK pints (160 UK fluid ounces; about 1.2 US gallons or 4.546 litres). The US gallon is 8 US pints (128 US fluid ounces; about 0.83 UK gallon or 3.785 litres).

In the 20th century, the metric system was officially adopted in the UK, for most purposes. Both imperial and metric are taught in schools and used in books. It is now mandatory for the sale of food to also show metric. However, it is not uncommon to purchase goods which are measured and labeled in metric, but the actual measure is rounded to the equivalent imperial measure (i.e., milk labeled as 568 mL / 1 pint). In September 2007, the EU deregulated prescribed metric packaging of most products, leaving only wines and spirits subject to prescribed EU-wide pre-packaging legislation. The law relating to labelling of products remaining unchanged.

== Special instructions ==
Volume measures of compressible ingredients have a substantial measurement uncertainty, in the case of flour of about 20%. Some volume-based recipes, therefore, attempt to improve the reproducibility by including additional instructions for measuring the correct amount of an ingredient. For example, a recipe might call for "1 cup brown sugar, firmly packed", or "2 heaping cups flour". A few of the more common special measuring methods:

Firmly packed
With a spatula, a spoon, or by hand, the ingredient is pressed as tightly as possible into the measuring device.
Lightly packed
The ingredient is pressed lightly into the measuring device, only tightly enough to ensure no air pockets.
Even / level
A precise measure of an ingredient, discarding all of the ingredient that rises above the rim of the measuring device. Sweeping across the top of the measure with the back of a straight knife or the blade of a spatula is a common leveling method.
Rounded
Allowing a measure of an ingredient to pile up above the rim of the measuring device naturally, into a soft, rounded shape.
Heaping / heaped
The maximum amount of an ingredient which will stay on the measuring device.
Sifted
This instruction may be seen in two different ways, with two different meanings: before the ingredient, as "1 cup sifted flour", indicates the ingredient should be sifted into the measuring device (and normally leveled), while after the ingredient, as "1 cup flour, sifted", denotes the sifting should occur after measurement.

Such special instructions are unnecessary in weight-based recipes.

== See also ==
- Cooking
- Gastronorm sizes (standard sizes of container)
- Gas mark, a system of oven temperatures used in the UK
- Gourmet Library and museum
- Imperial units
- Scoop (utensil), having their own system of measurement
- United States customary units
