= Salt spoon =

Kind of spoon

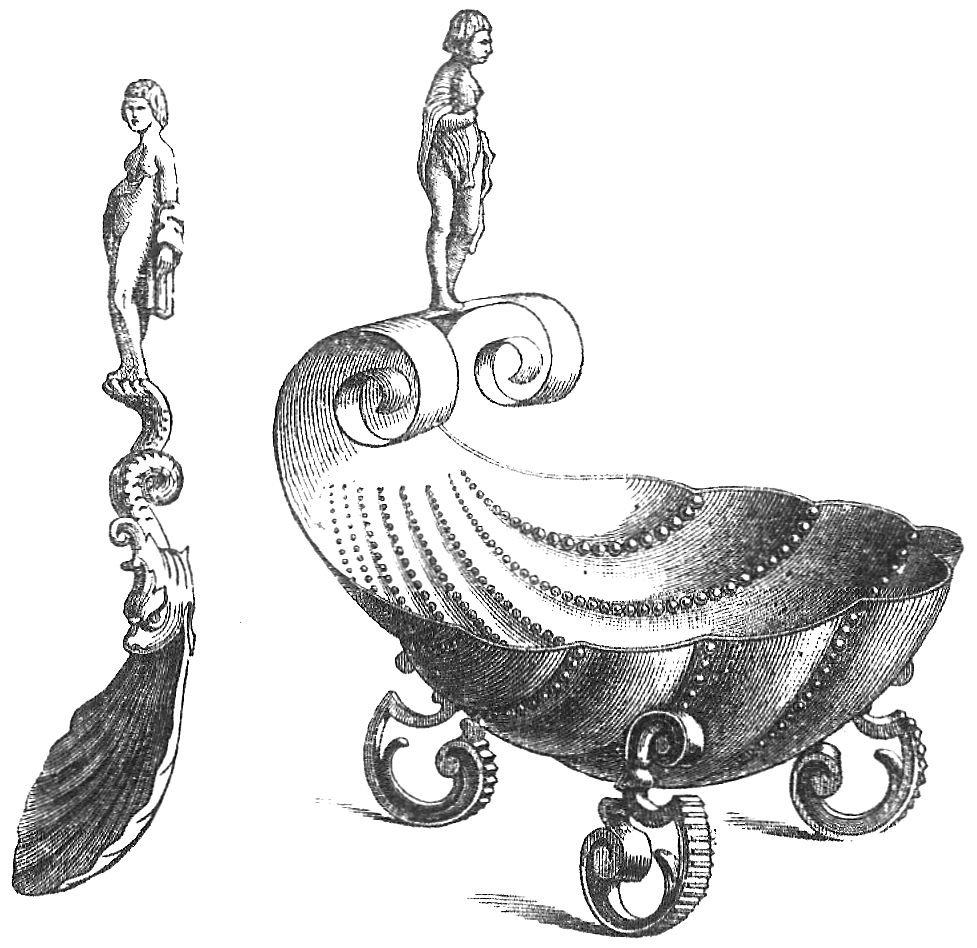
Salt cellar and salt spoon

A salt spoon is a miniature utensil used with an open salt cellar for individual service. It is a historical and nostalgic item from a time before table salt was free-flowing, as it is today. The spoon itself ranges from 2 to 3 inches (5 to 7.5 cm) long and has a circular bowl measuring approximately 0.5 to 0.75 inches (1.25 to 2 cm). They can be found in a wide range of materials including glass, Sterling silver, plastic, wood, ivory, bone and shell.

== History ==
Salt spoons apparently were not used until the 18th century. Design of these small spoons closely followed the design of the table spoons. The bowls tended to be of the round shape, with the exception of the cases where the bowl was unusual to accommodate some fantastic form of the overall spoon design.

Salt absorbs moisture from its surroundings, and had a tendency to clump together into one large lump. The head of the household usually presided over the distribution of salt at the dining table. This lump of salt was placed into a small dish, called by various names - open salt, salt cellar, table salt. Today we also refer to these as Master salts. It was then broken up with a knife handle or other utensil and placed into smaller, individual salt cellars, often matching the larger one in design. Since salt was such a precious seasoning, only small portions were given to each person at the table. Diners could either dip food into their individual salt cellars or use a small salt spoon to sprinkle the seasoning over their food.

In the early 1930s, a process was developed which coats each grain of salt with an anti-caking agent, keeping them from sticking together. Due to these changes in the processing of salt for consumer use, the open salt cellar and its accompanying salt spoon have become largely obsolete, having been replaced by the everyday saltshakers. They are, however, a highly collectable item and are still used today on some dining tables, out of a sense of nostalgia.

== Unit of measurement ==
In the United States, as a unit of measurement in some old recipes, 1 salt spoon (ssp) = 1/4 US customary teaspoon (20 US customary minims or 1/3 US customary fluid dram).

1 US customary salt spoon	=	20	US customary minims
	=	1/3	US customary fluid drams
	=	1/12	US customary tablespoon
	=	1/8	US customary dessert spoon
	=	1/4	US customary teaspoon
	=	1/2	US customary coffee spoons
	=	2	US customary dashes (solids only)
	=	4	US customary pinches (solids only)
	=	8	US customary smidgens (solids only)
	=	24	US customary drops (liquids only)
	≈	20·8	British imperial minims
	≈	0·35	British imperial fluid drachm
	≈	0·087	UK tablespoon
	≈	0·17	UK dessert spoon
	≈	0·35	UK teaspoon
	≈	0·69	UK salt spoon
	≈	1·39	UK pinches (solid only)
	≈	20·82	UK drops (liquids only)
	≈	1·23	millilitres
	≈	0·082	international metric tablespoon
	≈	0·062	Australian metric tablespoon
	≈	0·12	metric dessert spoon
	≈	0·25	metric teaspoon

In the United Kingdom, 1 salt spoon is traditionally 30 British imperial minims (1/2 British imperial fluid drachm), the equivalence of 1/8 UK tablespoon, 1/4 UK dessert spoon, or 1/2 UK teaspoon.

1 UK salt spoon	=	30	British imperial minims
	=	1/2	British imperial fluid drachm
	=	1/8	UK tablespoon
	=	1/4	UK dessert spoon
	=	1/2	UK teaspoon
	=	2	UK pinches (solids only)
	=	30	UK drops (liquids only)
	=	1/16	British imperial fluid ounce
	≈	28·8	US customary minims
	≈	0·48	US customary fluid dram
	≈	0·12	US customary tablespoon
	≈	0·18	US customary dessert spoon
	≈	0·36	US customary teaspoon
	≈	0·72	US customary coffee spoon
	≈	1·44	US customary salt spoons
	≈	2·88	US customary dashes (solids only)
	≈	5·76	US customary pinches (solids only)
	≈	11·53	US customary smidgens (solids only)
	≈	34·59	US customary drops (liquids only)
	≈	1·78	millilitres
	≈	0·118	international metric tablespoon
	≈	0·09	Australian metric tablespoon
	≈	0·18	metric dessert spoon
	≈	0·36	metric teaspoon

== Sources ==
- Jackson, Charles James (1911). "The spoon and its history: Its form, material, and development". An Illustrated History of English Plate, Ecclesiastical and Secular: In which the Development of Form and Decoration in the Silver and Gold Work of the British Isles, from the Earliest Known Examples to the Latest of the Georgian Period, is Delineated and Described, Volume 2. "Country life," limited. pp. 470–537. OCLC 1074655150.
