= ♏︎ =

♏︎ is a symbol which may refer to:

- Scorpio, the eighth astrological sign in the zodiac, in astrology;
- The minim, a unit used in ancient apothecaries' system of measurement;
- An alchemical symbol.
