= A grain of salt =

English idiom expressing skepticism

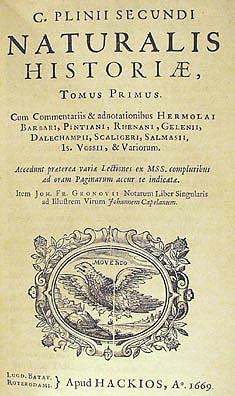
Pliny the Elder's Naturalis Historia may be the origin of the phrase.

To take something with a "grain of salt" or "pinch of salt" is an English idiom that suggests to view something, specifically claims that may be misleading or unverified, with skepticism or not to interpret something literally.

In the old-fashioned English units of weight, a grain weighs approximately 65 mg, which is about how much table salt a person might pick up between the fingers as a pinch.

== History ==
The phrase is thought to come from Pliny the Elder's Naturalis Historia, regarding the discovery of a recipe written by the Pontic king Mithridates to make someone immune to poison. One of the ingredients in the recipe was a grain of salt.

The phrase cum grano salis ("with a grain of salt") is not what Pliny wrote. Pliny's actual words were addito salis grano ("after having added a grain of salt").

The Latin word sal (salis is the genitive) means both "salt" and "wit", thus the Latin phrase cum grano salis could be translated to either "with a grain of salt" or "with a grain of wit", actually to "with caution"/cautiously.

The phrase is typically said "with a pinch of salt" in British English and said "with a grain of salt" in American and Canadian English.
