= Salt cellar =

Container for salt

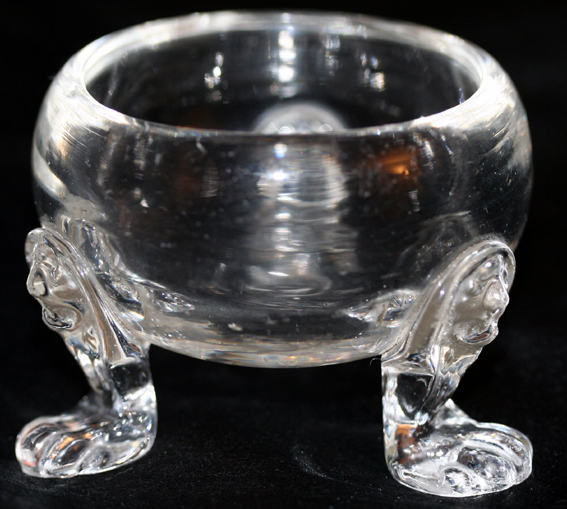
An English glass salt cellar, circa 1720

A salt cellar (also called a salt, salt-box) is an article of tableware for holding and dispensing salt. In British English, the term can be used for what in North American English are called salt shakers. Salt cellars can be either lidded or open, and are found in a wide range of sizes, from large shared vessels to small individual dishes. Styles range from simple to ornate or whimsical, using materials including glass and ceramic, metals, ivory and wood, and plastic.

Use of salt cellars is documented as early as ancient Rome. They continued to be used through the first half of the 20th century; however, usage began to decline with the introduction of free-flowing salt in 1911, and they have been almost entirely replaced by salt shakers.

Salt cellars were an early collectible as pieces of silver, pewter, glass, etc. Soon after their role at the table was replaced by the shaker, salt cellars became a popular collectible in their own right.

== Etymology ==
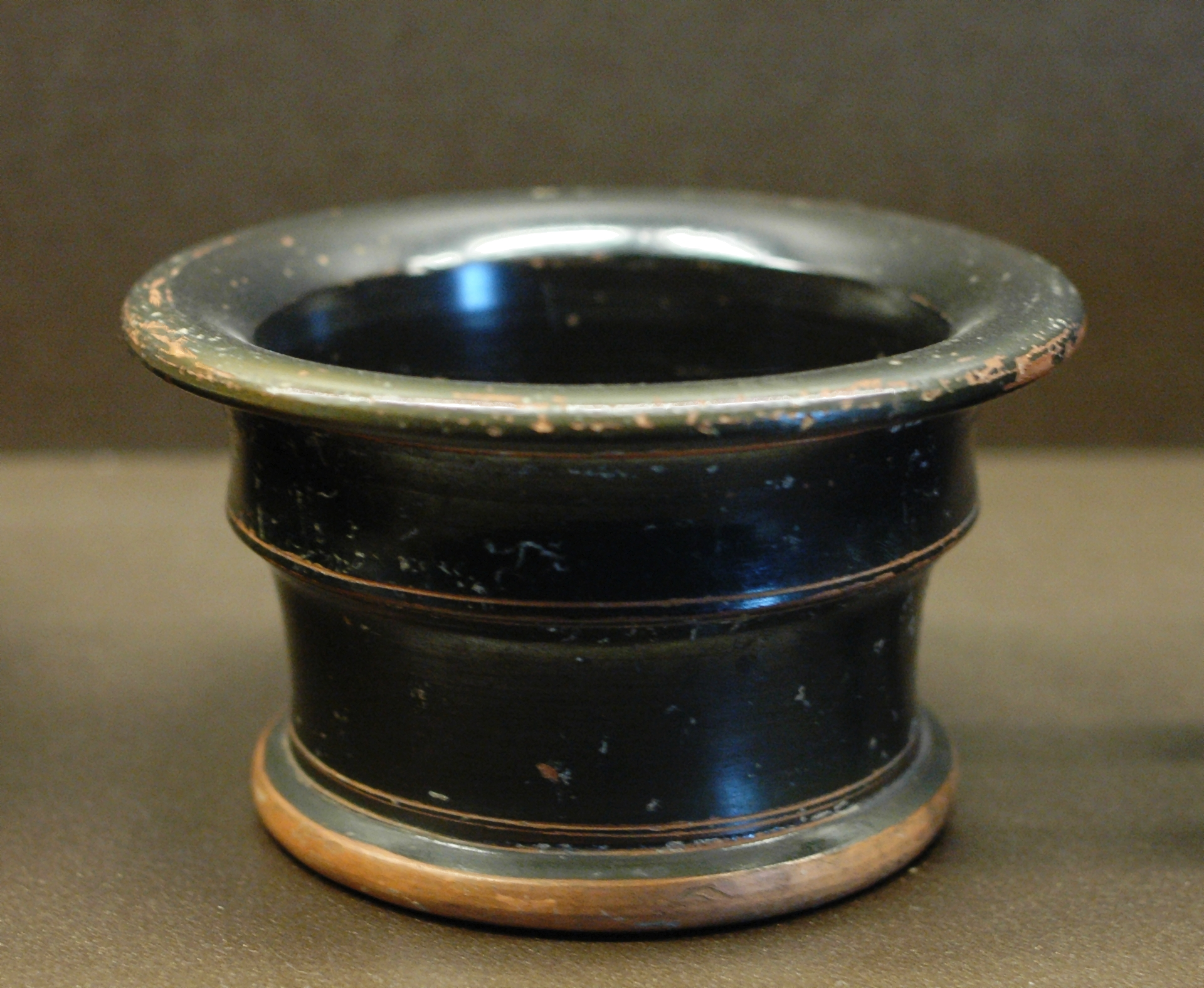
Black-glaze salt cellar. Terracotta, 5th century BC, Athens.

The word salt cellar is attested in English from the 15th century. It combines the English word salt with the Anglo-Norman word saler (from Latin sāl), which already by itself meant "salt container".

Salt cellars are known, in various forms, by assorted names including open salt, salt dip, standing salt, master salt, and salt dish. A master salt is the large receptacle from which the smaller, distributed, salt dishes are filled; according to fashion or custom it was lidded, or open, or covered with a cloth. A standing salt is a master salt, so-named because it remained in place as opposed to being passed. A trencher salt is a small salt cellar located next to the trencher (i.e., place setting). Open salt and salt dip refer to salt dishes that are uncovered.

The term salt cellar is also used generally to describe any container for table salt, thus encompassing salt shakers and salt pigs.

== History ==
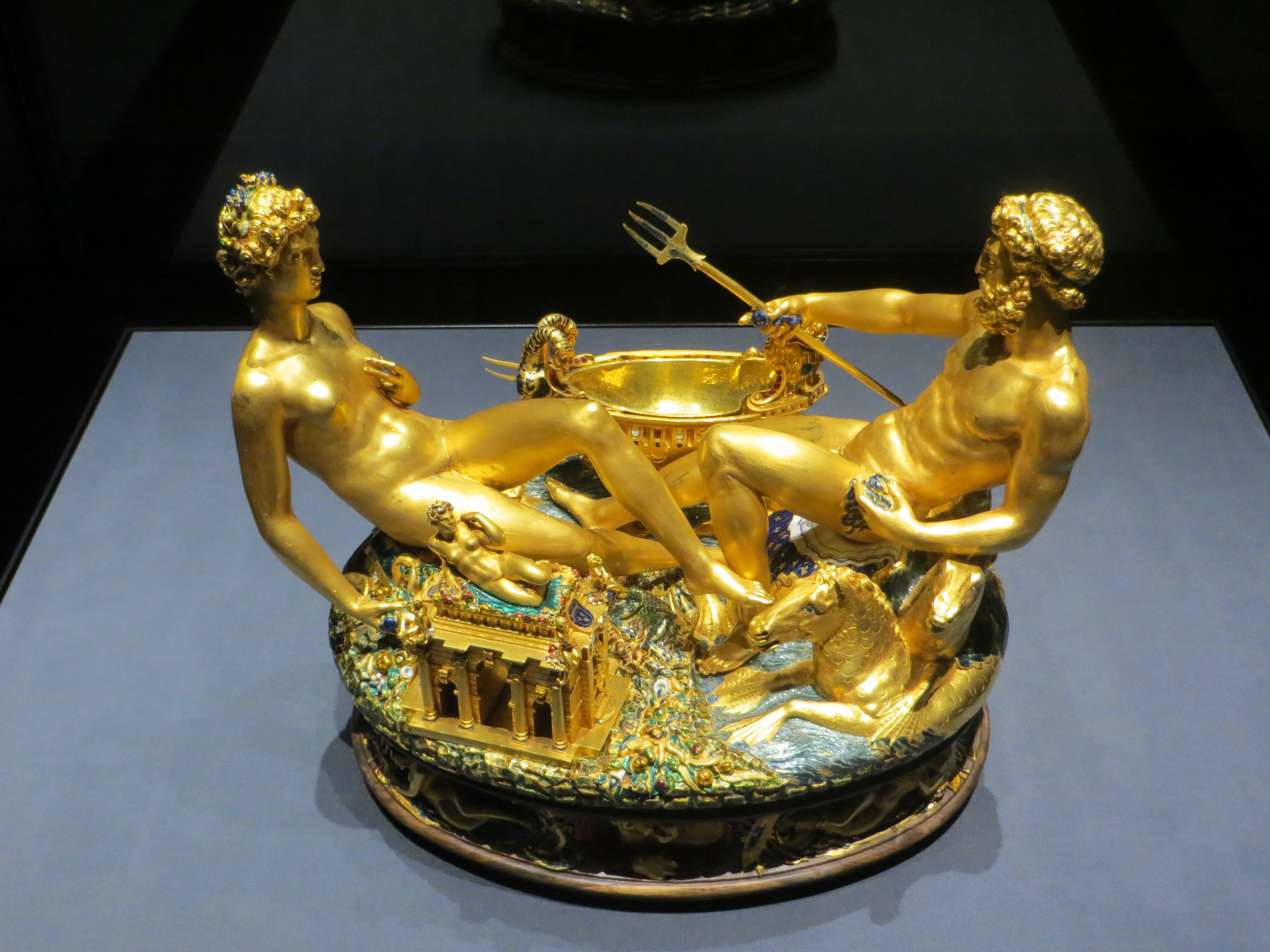
Cellini's Salt Cellar, made for Francis I of France, 1540–1543. Gold, partly enameled, with an ebony base. Depicts Earth and Sea personified.

Greek artifacts from the classical period in the shape of small bowls are often called salt cellars. Their function remains uncertain, though they may have been used for condiments including salt. The Romans had the salinum, a receptacle typically of silver and regarded as essential in every household. The salinum had ceremonial importance as the container of the (salt) offering made during the meal, but it was also used to dispense salt to diners.

During the Middle Ages, elaborate master salt cellars evolved. Placed at the head table, this large receptacle was a sign of status and prosperity, prominently displayed. It was usually made of silver and often decorated in motifs of the sea. In addition to the master salt, smaller, simpler salt cellars were distributed for diners to share; these could take forms as simple as slices of stale bread. The social status of guests could be measured by their positions relative to the master's large salt cellar: high-ranking guests sat above the salt while those of lesser importance sat below the salt.

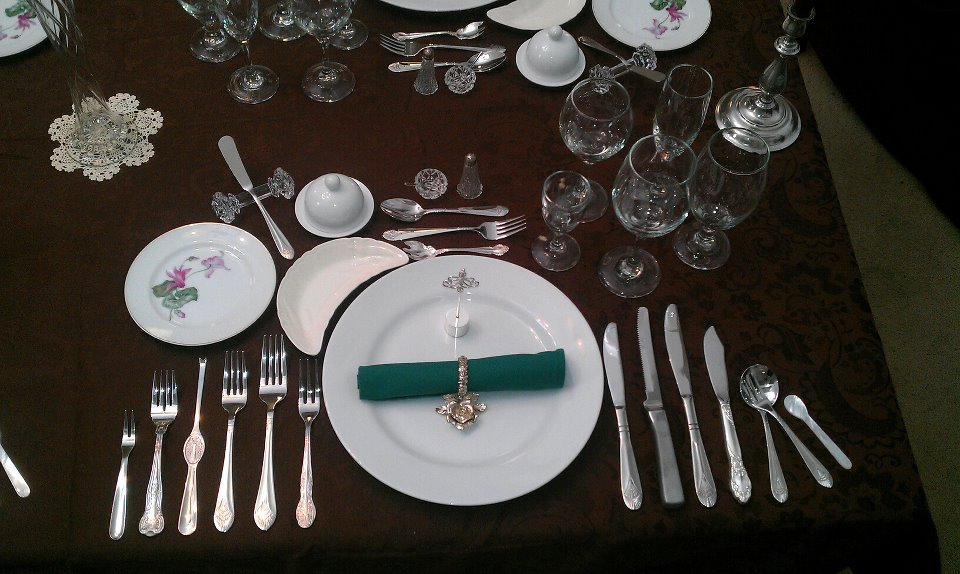
Formal place setting for a 12 course dinner; individual salt cellar at top of place setting

Large, ornate master salts continued to be made through the Renaissance and Baroque periods, becoming more ceremonial. In England, the ornamental master salt came to be called a standing salt, because it was not passed but remained in place. By 1588, reference is documented in England to the "trencher salt"; by the early 18th century, these had mostly supplanted large salts. Tiny salt spoons appear in the 17th century, and in increasing numbers as the use of trencher salts increased.

The advent of the Industrial Revolution in the late 18th to early 19th centuries rendered both salt and salt cellars commonplace. From about 1825 pressed glass manufacture became an industry and thrived; because they were easy to mold, salt cellars were among the earliest items mass-produced by this method. Similarly, the development of Sheffield plate (18th century), then electroplating (19th century), led to mass production of affordable silver-plated wares, including salt cellars.

Salt shakers began to appear in the Victorian era, and patents show attempts to deal with the problem of salt clumping, but they remained the exception rather than the norm. It was not until after 1911, when anti-caking agents began to be added to table salt, that salt shakers gained favor and open salts began to fall into disuse.

== Collectibility ==
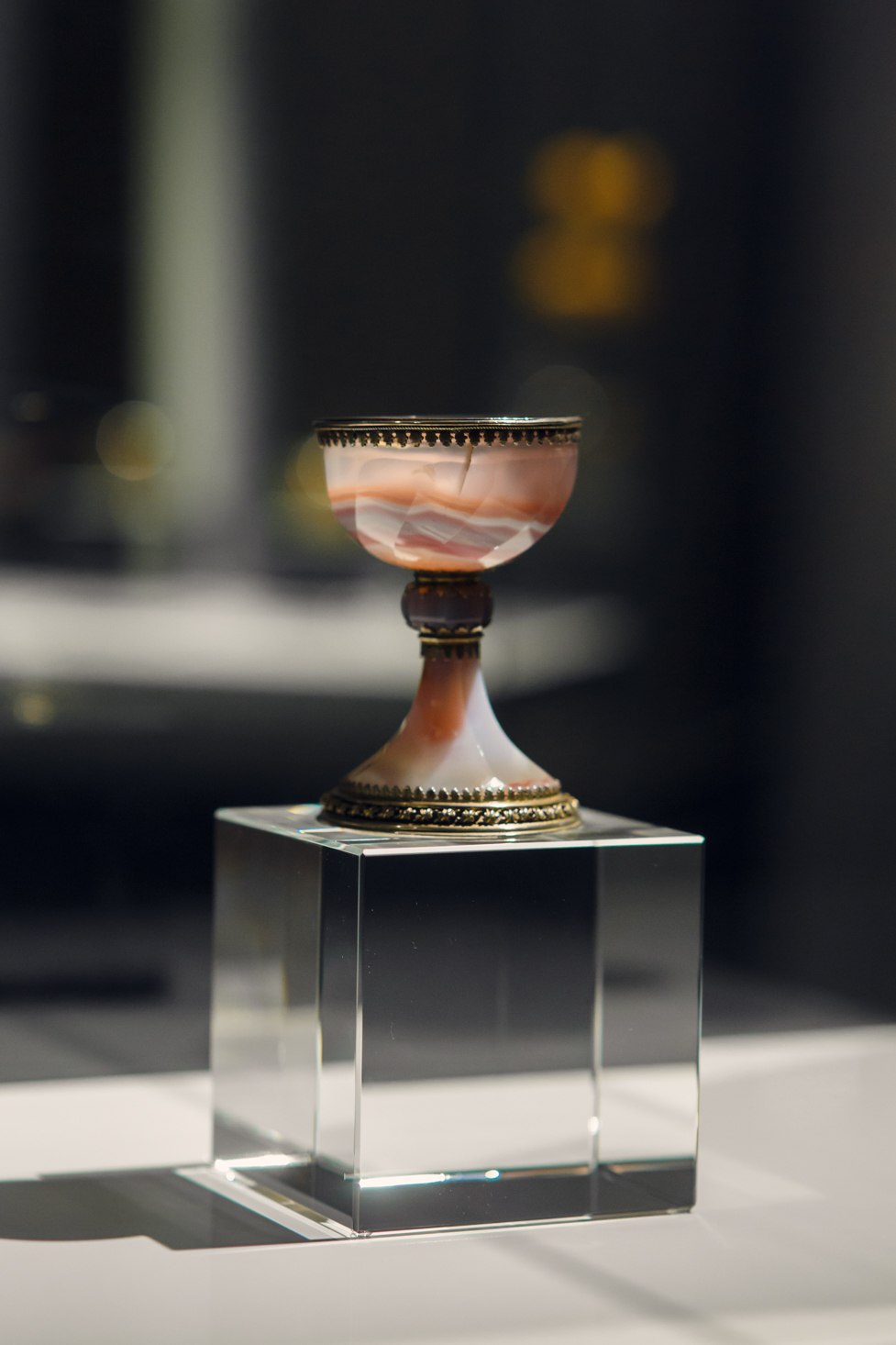
The gothic salt cellar from around 1500 on exhibition in Saltworks Castle (the oldest object in collection)

Silver, glass, china, pewter, stoneware, and other media used in the creation of tableware are collectible and have most likely been collected for centuries. By extension, salt cellars first became collectible as pieces of silver, glass, etc. Whether because of their commonness (and hence affordability), or the wide variety of them, or because of their slide into anachronism and quaintness, salt cellars themselves became collectible at latest by the 1930s.

Although antique salt cellars are not difficult to find and can be very affordable, modern manufacturers and artisans continue to make salt cellars. Reproductions are common, as are new designs that reflect current tastes.

The Muzeum Żup Krakowskich Wieliczka in Wieliczka, Poland, has a large collection of salt cellars. It contains over 1000 objects made of: porcelain, gold, silver, glass, wood, bone, quartz and mother-of-pearl. Those artifacts are on display in the Saltworks Castle (Zamek Żupny in Polish).

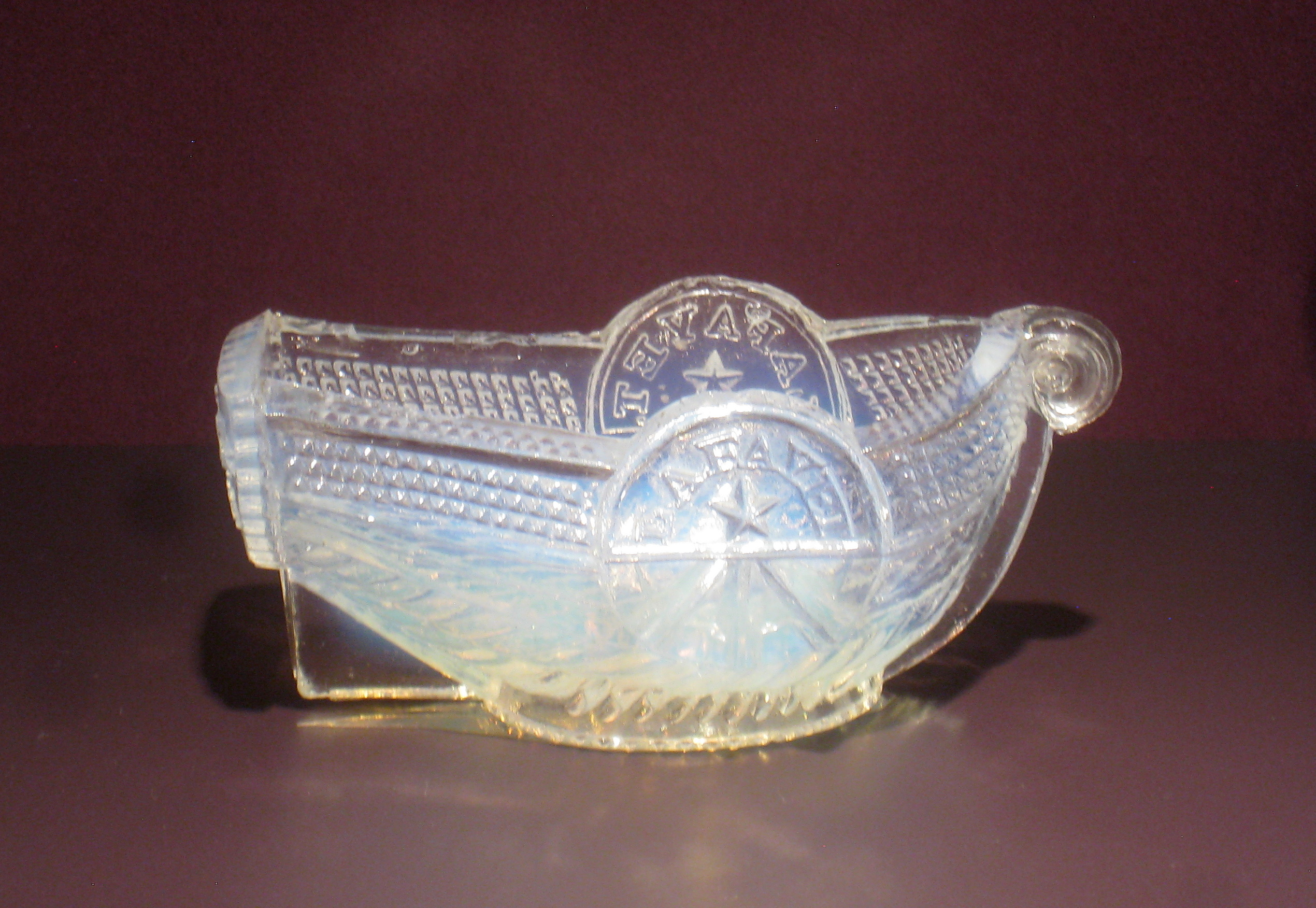
Open salt dish, pressed glass; Boston and Sandwich Glass Company, 1830–1835

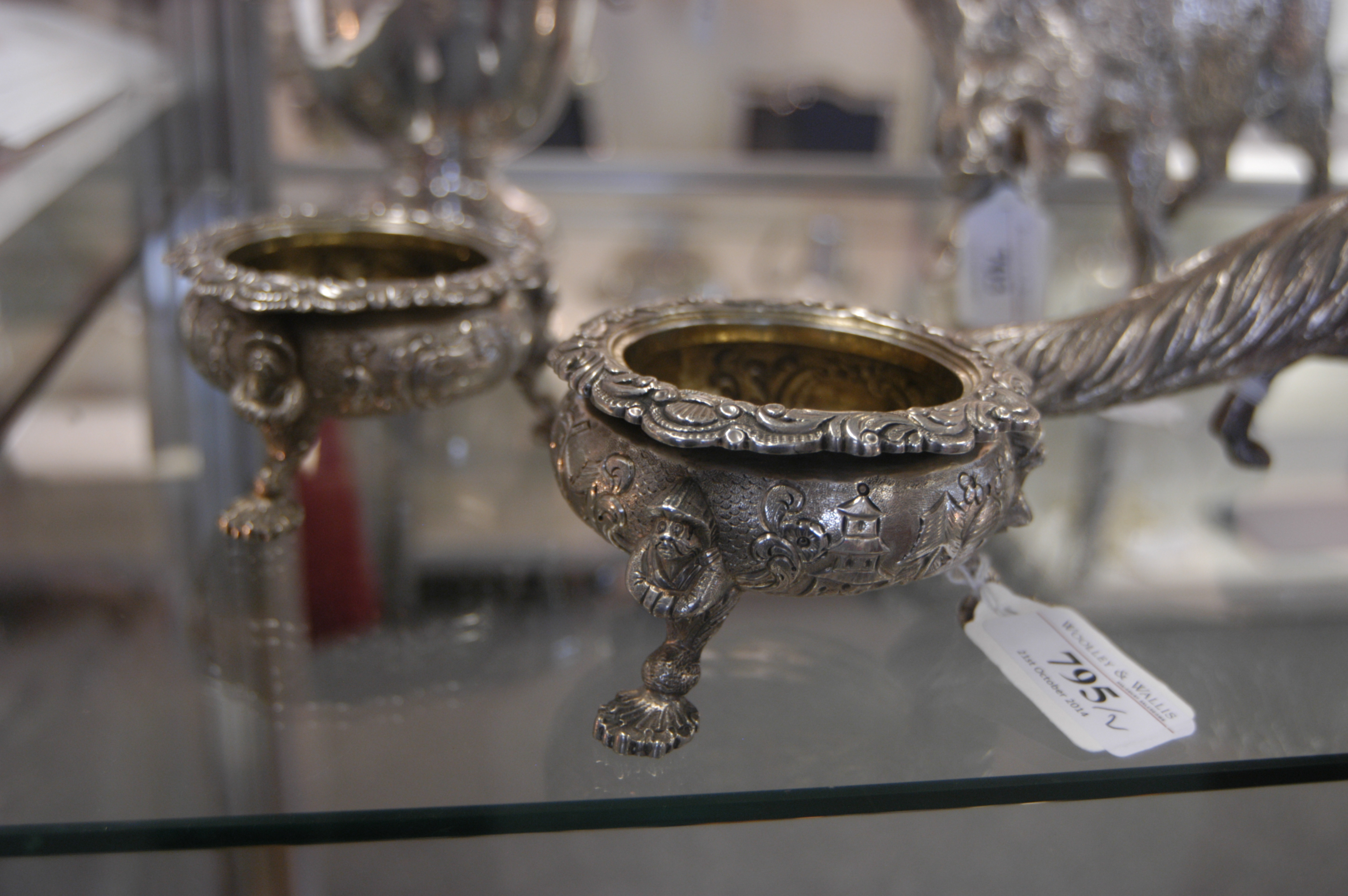
A pair of George IV Irish silver Chinoiserie salt cellars, by William Nowlan, Dublin, 1825

== Salt pig ==
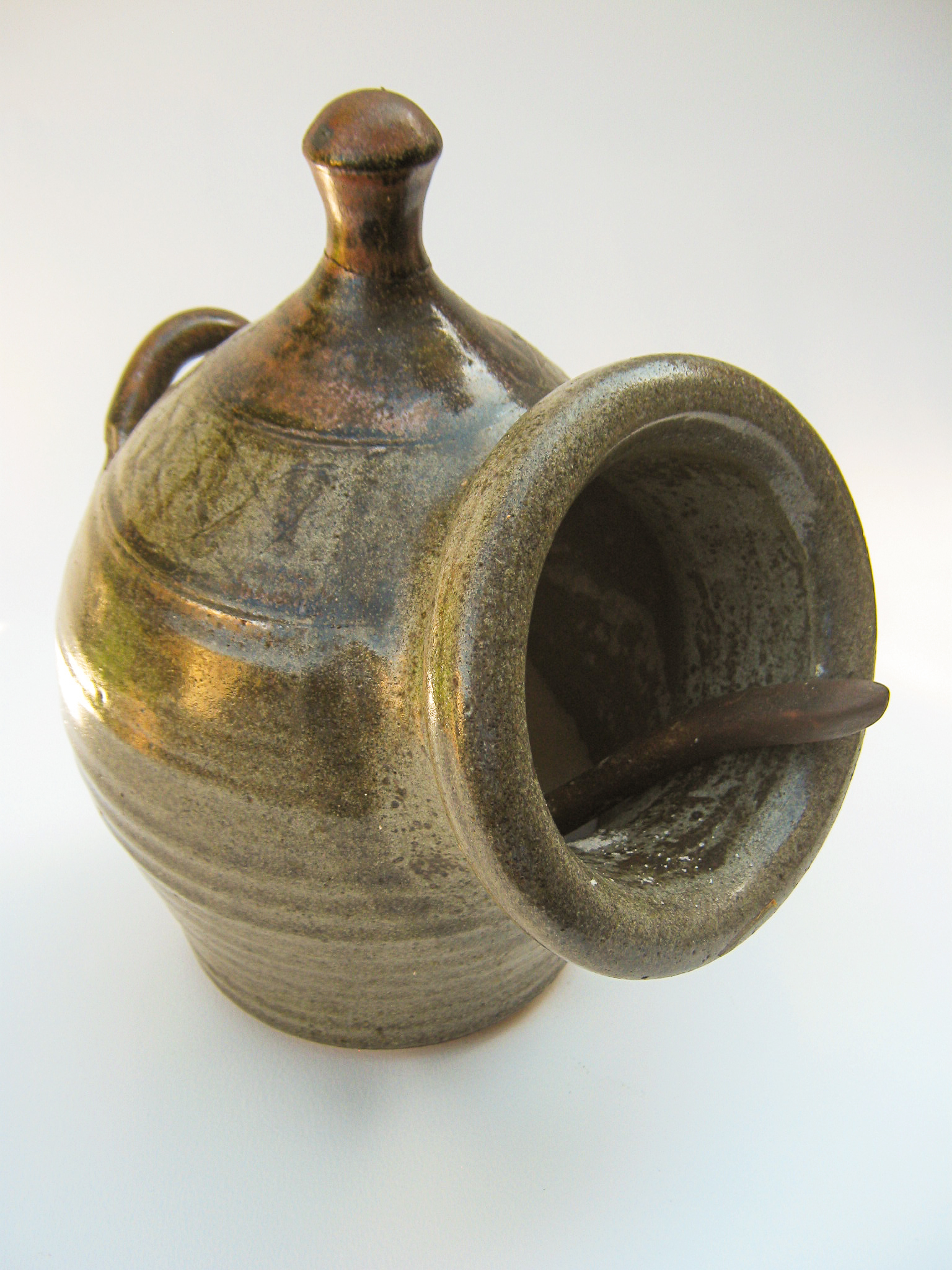
An example of a salt pig

A salt pig is a container used to hold salt, particularly in a kitchen, to make it easily accessible to pinch or spoon measure into dishes. They are available in many materials, but are generally ceramic, porcelain, earthenware or clay. The earthenware construction of a salt pig can help keep the salt from clumping in humid kitchens. In the blog Mundane Essays, writer Muness Alrubaiehis researched the origin of the term "salt pig", finding the use of "pig" in Scots and northern English dialect to mean an earthenware vessel.

== See also ==
- Nef
- Salt spoon
- Salt cellar (origami)
