= Teaspoon =

Kind of spoon

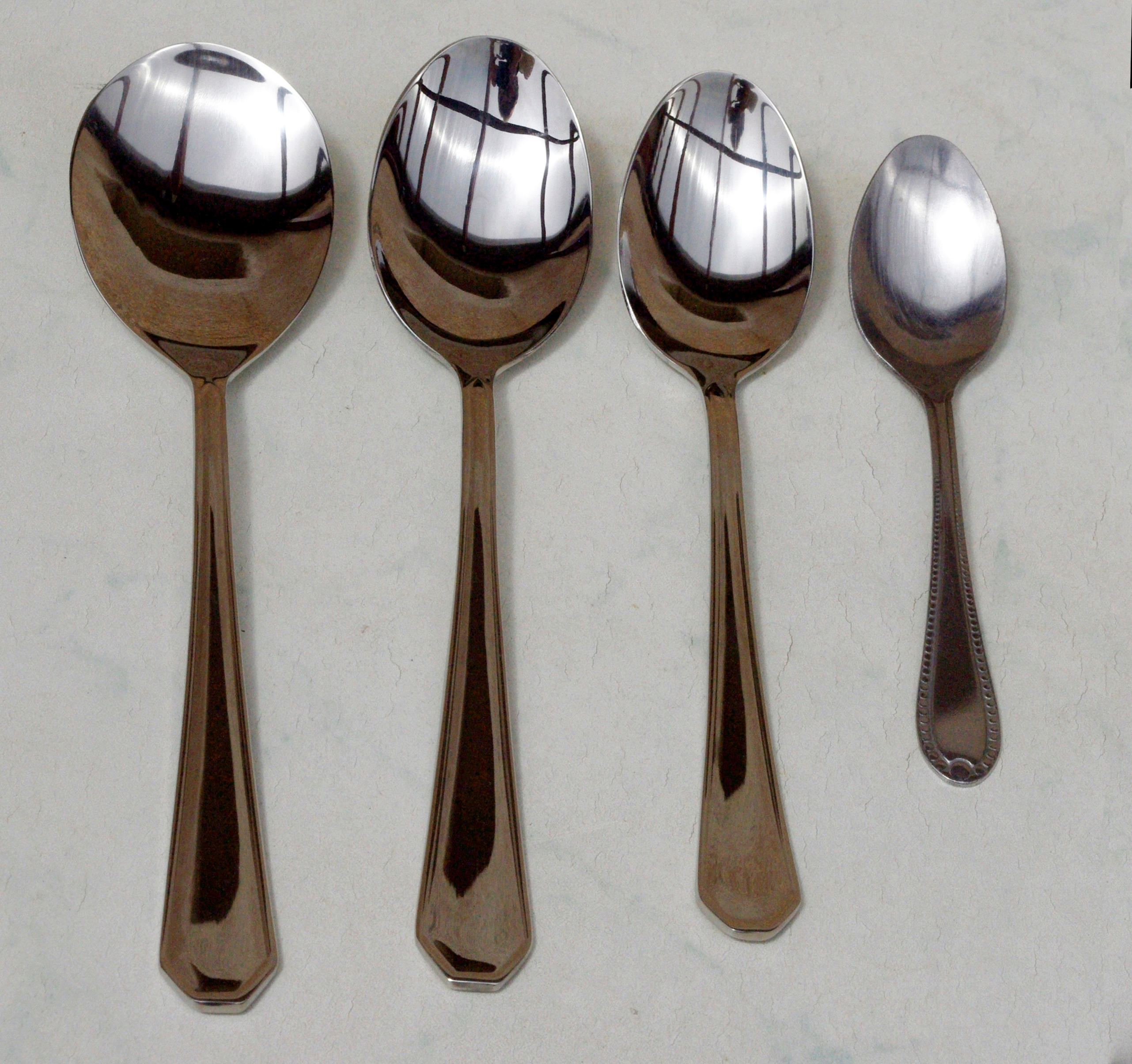
left-to-right: Serving spoon; Tablespoon (tbsp.); Dessert spoon (dsp.); Teaspoon (tsp.)

A teaspoon (tsp.) is a small spoon that can be used to stir a cup of tea or coffee, or as a tool for measuring volume. The size of teaspoons ranges from about 2.5 to 7.3 mL (0.088 to 0.257 imp fl oz; 0.085 to 0.247 US fl oz). For dosing of medicine and, in places where metric units are used, for cooking purposes, a teaspoonful is defined as 5 mL (0.18 imp fl oz; 0.17 US fl oz), and standard measuring spoons are used.

== Cutlery ==
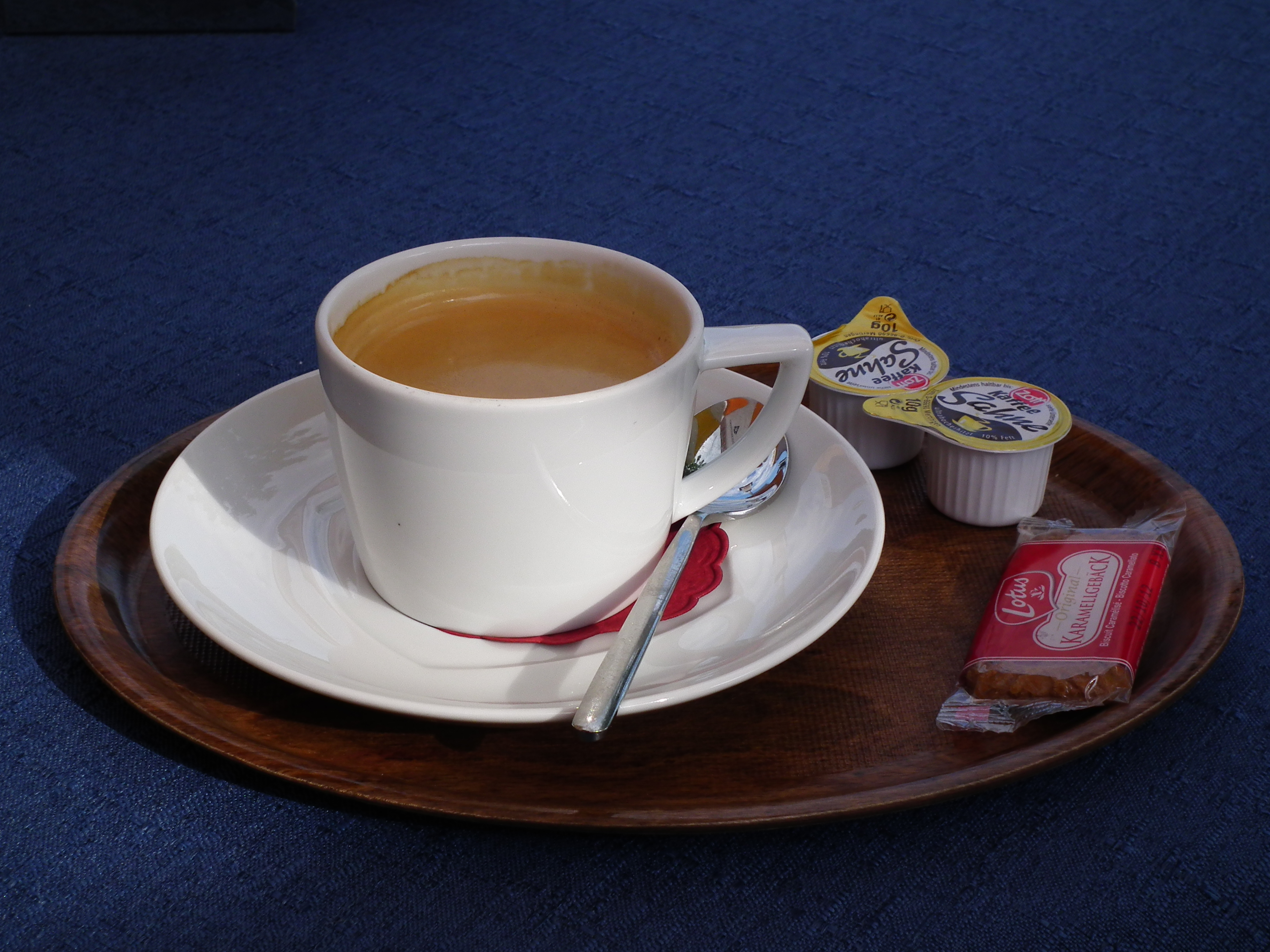
A cup of coffee with coffee spoon

A teaspoon is a small spoon suitable for stirring and sipping the contents of a cup of tea or coffee, or adding a portion of loose sugar to it. These spoons have heads more or less oval in shape. Teaspoons are a common part of a place setting.

Teaspoons with longer handles, such as iced tea spoons, are commonly used also for ice cream desserts or floats. Similar spoons include the tablespoon and the dessert spoon, the latter intermediate in size between a teaspoon and a tablespoon, used in eating dessert and sometimes soup or cereals. Much less common is the coffee spoon, which is a smaller version of the teaspoon, intended for use with the small type of coffee cup. (Note: T. S. Eliot's poem The Love Song of J. Alfred Prufrock mentions coffee spoons: "For I have known them all already, known them all: / Have known the evenings, mornings, afternoons, / I have measured out my life with coffee spoons;")

Another teaspoon, called an orange spoon (in American English: grapefruit spoon), tapers to a sharp point or teeth, and is used to separate citrus fruits from their membranes. A bar spoon, equivalent to a teaspoon, is used in measuring ingredients for mixed drinks.

A container designed to hold extra teaspoons, called a spooner, usually in a set with a covered sugar container, formed a part of Victorian table service.

== History ==
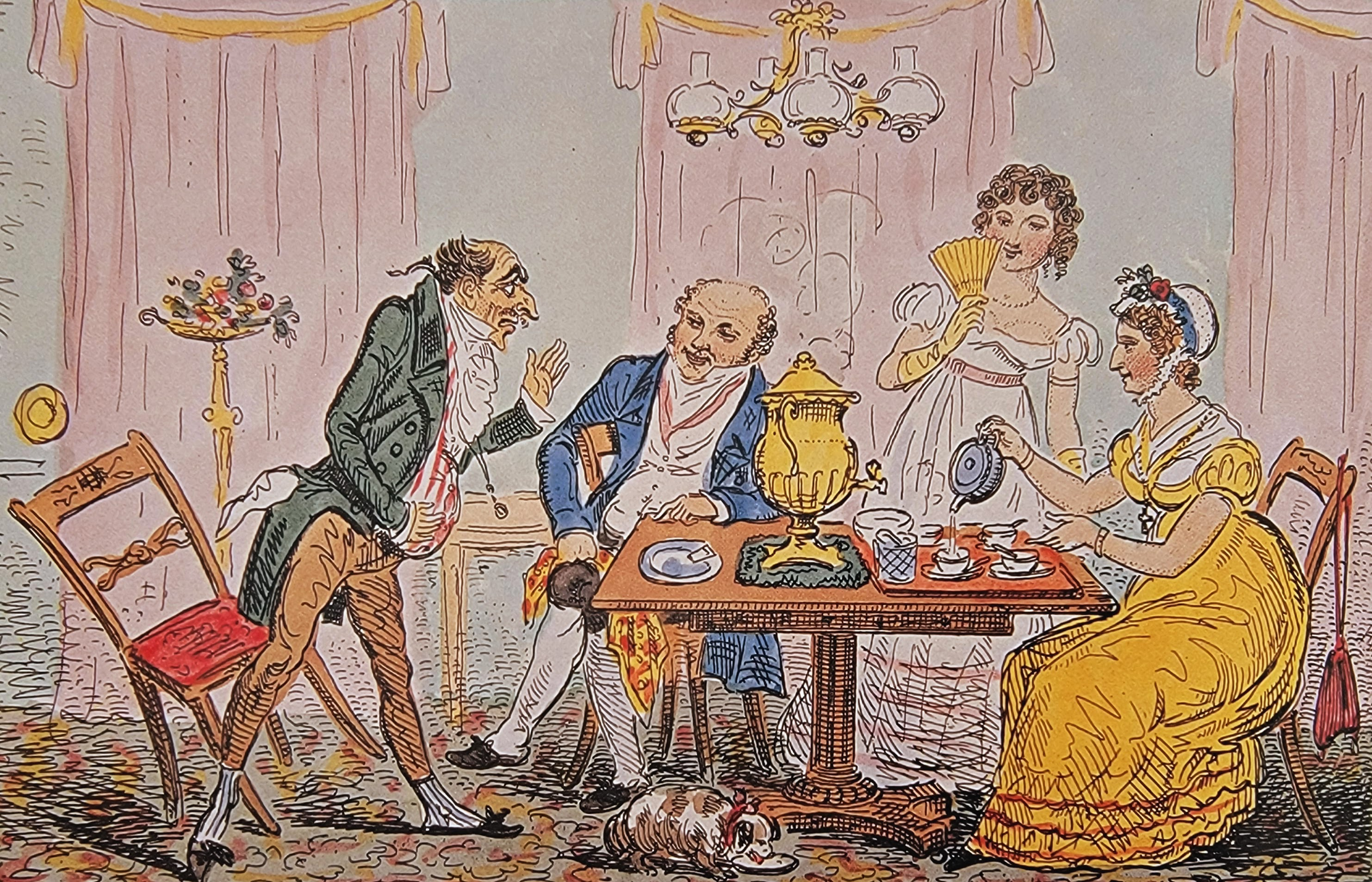
An 1825 cartoon makes fun of a Frenchman unfamiliar with the British etiquette. The guest did not place his spoon into the cup and is thus being offered his thirteenth cup of tea.

The teaspoon is a European invention. Small spoons were common in Europe since at least the 13th century. These special spoons were introduced almost simultaneously with tea and coffee in the mid-17th century. Originally teaspoons were exotic items, precious and small, resembling the demitasse spoons of the later times.

Also used for coffee, these spoons were usually made of gilt silver, and were available with a variety of handle shapes: plain, twisted, decorated with knobs, also known as knops, hence the knop-top name for such spoons. Widespread use and modern size date back to the Georgian era. The teaspoon is first mentioned in an advertisement in a 1686 edition of the London Gazette. Teaspoons, probably of English origin, are present on the 1700 Dutch painting by Nicholas Verkolje, "A Tea Party".

A special dish for resting the teaspoons, a "spoon boat", was a part of the tea set in the 18th century. At that time, the spoons were playing important role in the tea drinking etiquette: a spoon laid "across" the teacup indicated that the guest did not need any more tea, otherwise, the hostess was obligated to offer a fresh cup of tea, and it was considered impolite to refuse the offering. Sometimes the spoons were numbered to make it easier to match the cups with the guests after a refill.

== Unit of measure ==
teaspoon
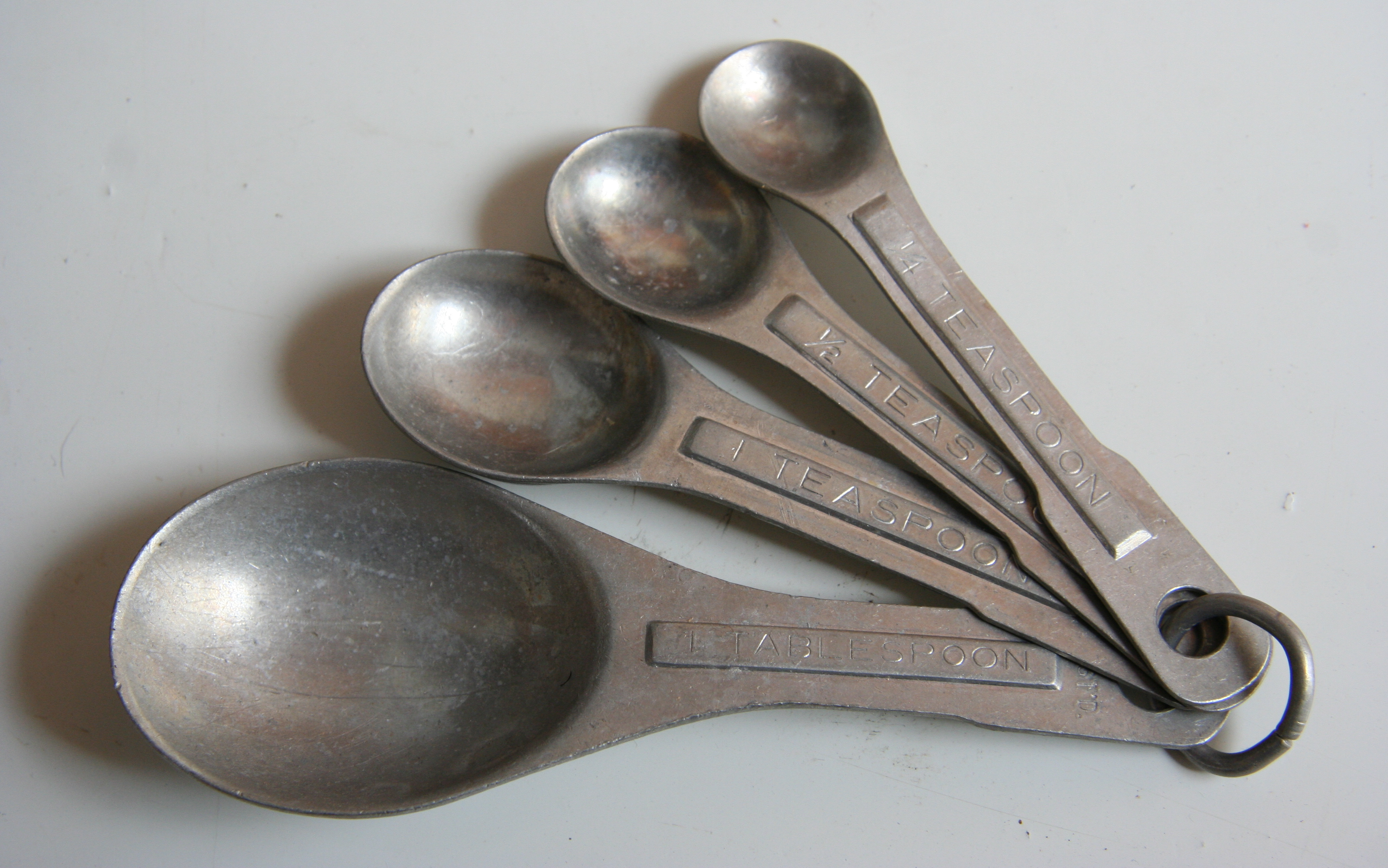
- Measuring spoons, with the second largest one representing the volume of a teaspoon.

General information
- Unit system: Imperial units, US customary units
- Unit of: Volume
- Symbol: tsp

Conversions (imperial)
1 imp tsp in ...	... is equal to ...
- SI units: 3.552 mL
- US customary units: 0.721 US tsp

Conversions (US)
1 US tsp in ...	... is equal to ...
- SI units: 4.929 mL
- Imperial units: 1.388 imp tsp

In some countries, a teaspoon (occasionally teaspoonful) is a cooking measure of volume, especially widely used in cooking recipes and pharmaceutic medical prescriptions. In English it is abbreviated as tsp. or, less often, as t., ts., or tspn.. The abbreviation is never capitalized because a capital letter is customarily reserved for the larger tablespoon ("Tbsp.", "T.", "Tbls.", or "Tb."). (Note: In German and Dutch, teaspoon is abbreviated TL, for Teelöffel and Theelepel respectively.)

A small scale study in Greece found that household teaspoons are a poor approximation of the standard tsp measure. The study investigated the accuracy of teaspoons as a measuring tool for liquid medicine. They surveyed 71 teaspoons from 25 houses and found that the volume varied between 2.5 and 7.3 mL (0.088 and 0.257 imp fl oz; 0.085 and 0.247 US fl oz).

=== Metric teaspoon ===
The metric teaspoon as a unit of culinary measure is 5 mL, equal to 5 cm^{3}, 1/3 international metric tablespoon, or 1/4 Australian metric tablespoon.

1 metric teaspoon	=	5	mL
	=	1/3	international metric tablespoon
	=	1/4	Australian metric tablespoon
	=	1/2	metric dessert spoon
	≈	1.41	British imperial fluid drachms
	≈	0.18	British imperial fluid ounce
	≈	0.35	UK tablespoon
	≈	0.7	UK dessert spoon
	≈	1.41	UK teaspoons
	≈	2.81	UK salt spoons
	≈	5.63	UK pinches (solids only)
	≈	84.47	UK drops (liquids only)
	≈	1.35	US customary fluid drams
	≈	0.17	US customary fluid ounce
	≈	0.34	US customary tablespoon
	≈	0.51	US customary dessert spoon
	≈	1.01	US customary teaspoons
	≈	2.03	US customary coffee spoons
	≈	4.06	US customary salt spoons
	≈	8.11	US customary dashes (solids only)
	≈	16.23	US customary pinches (solids only)
	≈	32.46	US customary smidgens (solids only)
	≈	97.38	US customary drops (liquids only)

=== United States customary unit ===
As a unit of culinary measure, one teaspoon in the United States is 1/3 tablespoon, exactly 4.92892159375 millilitres (mL), 1 1/3 US customary fluid drams, 1/6 US customary fl. oz, 1/48 US cup, 1/768 US liquid gallon, or 77/256 (0.30078125) cubic inches.

1 US customary teaspoon	=	1 1/3	US customary fluid drams
	=	1/6	US customary fluid ounce
	=	1/3	US customary tablespoon
	=	1/2	US customary dessert spoon
	=	2	US customary coffee spoons
	=	4	US customary salt spoons
	=	8	US customary dashes (solids only)
	=	16	US customary pinches (solids only)
	=	32	US customary smidgens (solids only)
	=	96	US customary drops (liquids only)
	≈	1.39	British imperial fluid drachms
	≈	0.17	British imperial fluid ounce
	≈	0.35	UK tablespoon
	≈	0.69	UK dessert spoons
	≈	1.39	UK teaspoons
	≈	2.78	UK salt spoons
	≈	5.55	UK pinches (solid only)
	≈	83.27	UK drops (liquids only)
	=	4.92892159375	millilitres
	≈	0.33	international metric tablespoon
	≈	0.25	Australian metric tablespoon
	≈	0.49	metric dessert spoon
	≈	0.99	metric teaspoon

For nutritional labeling and medicine in the US, the teaspoon is defined the same as a metric teaspoon—precisely 5 millilitres (mL).

=== British culinary measurement unit ===
Traditionally, in the United Kingdom, 1 teaspoon is 1 British imperial fluid drachm (1/8 British imperial fluid ounce). 1 UK teaspoon is the equivalence of 1/4 UK tablespoon, 1/2 UK dessert spoon, or 2 UK salt spoons.

1 UK teaspoon	=	1	British imperial fluid drachm
	=	1/4	UK tablespoon
	=	1/2	UK dessert spoon
	=	2	UK salt spoons
	=	4	UK pinches (solids only)
	=	60	UK drops (liquids only)
	=	1/8	British imperial fluid ounce
	≈	0.96	US customary fluid dram
	≈	0.12	US customary fluid ounce
	≈	0.24	US customary tablespoon
	≈	0.36	US customary dessert spoon
	≈	0.72	US customary teaspoon
	≈	1.44	US customary coffee spoons
	≈	2.88	US customary salt spoons
	≈	5.76	US customary dashes (solids only)
	≈	11.53	US customary pinches (solids only)
	≈	23.06	US customary smidgens (solids only)
	≈	69.17	US customary drops (liquids only)
	≈	3.55	millilitres
	≈	0.24	international metric tablespoon
	≈	0.18	Australian metric tablespoon
	≈	0.36	metric dessert spoon
	≈	0.71	metric teaspoon

=== Dry ingredients ===
For dry granular or powdered ingredients (e.g., salt, flour, spices, and especially beverages involving tea and sugar), a recipe may call for the spoon to be filled in a certain way that changes the volume of the ingredient. As with much of cooking, these measures are by their nature inexact. This can be exacerbated here by failing to use a real teaspoon: a teaspoon's greater area supports considerably more to be heaped above it than a deeper hemispherical measuring spoon, so if using a measuring spoon, one will typically use less than called for by the recipe.

The definitions of "spoonful" vary. In American recipes, a "spoon" without clarification stands for a "level" spoon, with no ingredient showing above the rim of the spoon bowl. A British cookbook would mean a "round" or "heaped" spoon, with the ingredient peaking above the rim:

- A scant teaspoon is one which has been filled to slightly less than level.
- A level teaspoon, which is the default teaspoon if no adjective is given, refers to an approximately leveled filling of the spoon, producing the same volume as for liquids. The excess of ingredient can be scraped off by a knife.
- A rounded teaspoon is roughly symmetrical with as much ingredient above the rim as is in the spoon below the rim, giving a measure roughly equivalent to two level teaspoons.
- A heaping (North American English) or heaped (UK English) teaspoon is a larger inexact measure consisting of the amount obtained by scooping the dry ingredient up as high as possible to balance on a spoon. This quantity can vary considerably, up to 5 amounts of ingredient in the level spoon. Many cookbooks treat heaped and rounded spoons interchangeably.

Lincoln used the spoon measure without adjectives to define either a rounded one (for flour and sugar) or a level one (for salt and spices).

=== Apothecary ===
As an unofficial but once widely used unit of apothecaries' measure, the teaspoon is equal to 1 fluid dram (or drachm) and thus 1/4 of a tablespoon or 1/8 of a fluid ounce. The apothecaries' teaspoon was formally known by the Latin cochleare minus (cochl. min.) to distinguish it from the tablespoon or cochleare majus (cochl. maj.).

When tea-drinking was first introduced to England circa 1660, tea was rare and expensive, as a consequence of which teacups and teaspoons were smaller than today. This situation persisted until 1784, when the Commutation Act reduced the tax on tea from 119% to 12.5%. As the price of tea declined, the size of teacups and teaspoons increased. By the 1850s, the teaspoon as a unit of culinary measure had increased to 1/3 of a tablespoon, but the apothecary unit of measure remained the same. Nevertheless, the teaspoon, usually under its Latin name, continued to be used in apothecaries' measures for several more decades, with the original definition of one fluid dram.

== See also ==
- Bar spoon
- Caddy spoon, a specialized spoon used for taking dried tea out of a storage container
- Cooking weights and measures
- Dessert spoon
- Tablespoon

== Sources ==
- Ukers, William Harrison (1935). "Evolution of tea-making appliances". All about Tea, Volume 2. Tea and coffee trade journal Company. pp. 436–448. OCLC 1201914.
- Pettigrew, Jane (2001). A Social History of Tea. National Trust. ISBN 978-0-7078-0289-3. OCLC 1008339683.
- Falagas, M. E.; Vouloumanou, E. K.; Plessa, E.; Peppas, G.; Rafailidis, P. I. (August 2010). "Inaccuracies in dosing drugs with teaspoons and tablespoons: Drug dosing with teaspoons/tablespoons". International Journal of Clinical Practice. 64 (9): 1185–1189. doi:10.1111/j.1742-1241.2010.02402.x. PMID 20653796. S2CID 3062421.
- Veitgh, Henry Newton (October 1923). "Spoons Of Old English Plate". International Studio. LXXVIII (317): 121–124.
- Roth, Rodris (1961). "Tea Drinking in 18th-Century America: Its Etiquette and Equipage". United States National Museum Bulletin. 225 (Contributions from the Museum of History and Technology). Washington, DC: Smithsonian Institution: 61–91.
- Grigson, Jane (1 April 2007). "Spoon Measurements". Jane Grigson's Vegetable Book. U of Nebraska Press. p. xviii. ISBN 978-0-8032-5994-2. OCLC 1102099392. "By a heaped spoon, I mean as much of the ingredient as you can balance on a spoon-shaped spoon ... In England, by tradition, all spoon measurements given in recipes were rounded; in other words, there was as much above the rim of the spoon as below it"
- BBC (13 December 1945). "Recipes for the Housewife". Listener. 34: 715. "level spoon means level with the edges of the bowl; use a knife to level off... rounded spoon means as much above the bowl as you have in it: it is equal to 2 level spoons ... heaped spoon means as much as you can pile up onto the spoon: it is equal to 3, 4 or 5 level"
- Baggett, Nancy (11 September 2012). Simply Sensational Cookies: Bright Fresh Flowers, Natural Colors & Easy, Streamlined Techniques. Houghton Mifflin Harcourt. ISBN 978-0-544-18813-6. OCLC 1132332173. "Scant means that the spoon or cup should not be quite full"
- Collister, Linda (25 October 2012). "Spoon Measures - Level and Rounded". Great British Bake Off: Learn to Bake: 80 easy recipes for all the family. Random House. ISBN 978-1-4481-4051-0. OCLC 1100934893.
- Henderson, Fergus; Gellatly, Justin Piers (6 December 2008). "Conversion Tables". Beyond Nose to Tail: More Omnivorous Recipes for the Adventurous Cook. Bloomsbury Publishing USA. ISBN 978-1-59691-805-4. OCLC 858912920.
- Lincoln, Mary Johnson Bailey (1903). "Measuring". Boston School Kitchen Text-book: Lessons in Cooking for the Use of Classes in Public and Industrial Schools. Little, Brown. p. 24. OCLC 4053808. "A tablespoonful of flour, sugar and butter is a rounded spoonful. A teaspoonful of salt, soda, pepper and spice is a level spoonful. A heaped spoonful is all the spoon will hold"
