= Drop (unit) =

Unit of measure of volume

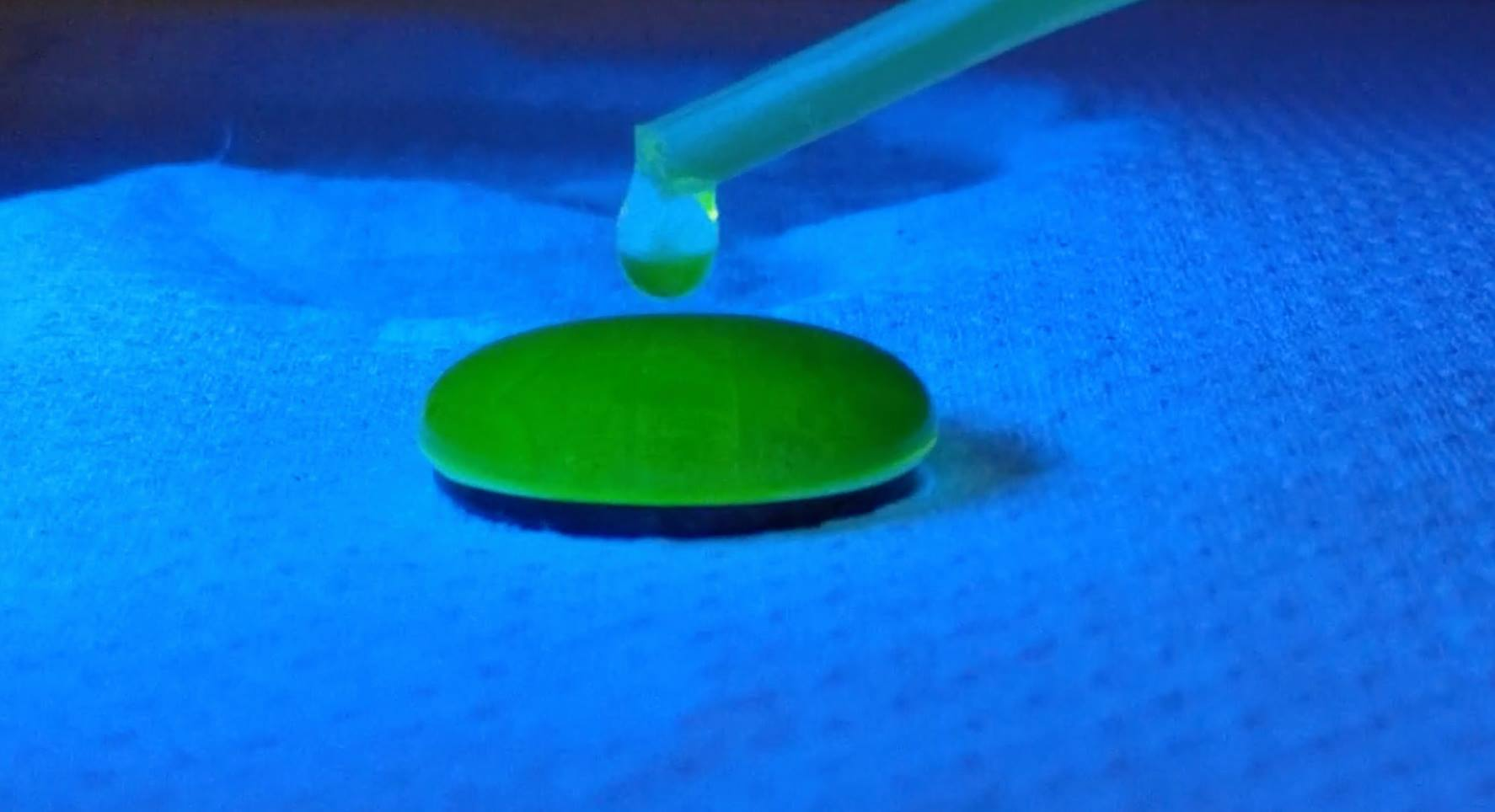
One drop hanging from the dropper.

The drop is an approximated unit of measure of volume, the amount dispensed as one drop from a dropper or drip chamber. It is often used in giving quantities of liquid drugs to patients, and occasionally in cooking and in organic synthesis. The abbreviations gt or gtt come from the Latin noun gutta ("drop").

The volume of a drop is not well defined: it depends on the device and technique used to produce the drop, on the strength of the gravitational field, and on the viscosity, density, and the surface tension of the liquid.

Several exact definitions exist:

- In medicine, Intravenous (IV) drips deliver 10, 15, 20, or 60 drops per Milliliter (ml). Micro-drip sets deliver 60 drops per ml and 10, 15, or 20 drops per ml for a macro-drip set.
- Prior to the adoption of the unit of the minim in the early 19th century, the smallest unit of fluid measure in the Apothecaries' systems of the United States customary units and pre-1824 English units was, while inexact, presumed to be equal to 1/60 of a fluid dram or 1/480 of a fluid ounce.
- Under the modern US customary measurement system, 1 drop is 1/72 of a US customary fluid dram.

1 US customary drop	=	5/6	US customary minim
	=	1/72	US customary fluid dram
	=	1/288	US customary tablespoon
	=	1/192	US customary dessert spoon
	=	1/96	US customary teaspoon
	=	1/48	US customary coffee spoon
	=	1/24	US customary salt spoon
	≈	0·87	British imperial minim
	≈	0·0036	UK tablespoon
	≈	0·0072	UK dessert spoon
	≈	0·014	UK teaspoon
	≈	0·029	UK salt spoon
	≈	0·87	UK drop
	≈	0·051	millilitre
	≈	0·0034	international metric tablespoon
	≈	0·0026	Australian metric tablespoon
	≈	0·0051	metric dessert spoon
	≈	0·01	metric teaspoon

- In the United Kingdom, subsequent to the adoption of the minim and the creation of the British imperial system of units in the 1820s, a drop is defined as 1 British imperial minim, the equivalence of 1/60 of a British imperial fluid drachm or 1/480 of a British imperial fluid ounce.

1 UK drop	=	1	British imperial minim
	=	1/60	British imperial fluid drachm
	=	1/240	UK tablespoon
	=	1/120	UK dessert spoon
	=	1/60	UK teaspoon
	=	1/30	UK salt spoon
	=	1/480	British imperial fluid ounce
	≈	0·96	US customary minims
	≈	0·016	US customary fluid dram
	≈	0·004	US customary tablespoon
	≈	0·006	US customary dessert spoon
	≈	0·012	US customary teaspoon
	≈	0·024	US customary coffee spoon
	≈	0·048	US customary salt spoon
	≈	1·15	US customary drops
	≈	0·059	millilitre
	≈	0·0039	international metric tablespoon
	≈	0·003	Australian metric tablespoon
	≈	0·006	metric dessert spoon
	≈	0·012	metric teaspoon

In organic synthesis, a synthetic procedure will often call for the addition of a reagent "dropwise" with the aid of a syringe or a dropping funnel. The rate of addition for such a procedure is taken to be slow but is otherwise vague: one chemist might consider dropwise to be one drop per second, another five to ten drops per second (almost a stream). Furthermore, needle gauge or the dimensions of the glassware also affect drop volume. To improve reproducibility, experimental procedures also note the total amount of time required to add the liquid or another measure of addition rate. In a related usage, the amount of a reagent, whose precise quantity is unimportant, will sometimes be given in terms of the number of drops, often from a glass pipette. In this usage, a drop is typically considered to be approximately 0.05 mL. The practice of giving quantities this way has declined in usage.

== History ==
In the first decade of the 19th century, the minim, the smallest unit of Apothecary Measure, was promoted by the pharmaceutical and medical establishments as an alternative to the drop. It was noted that the size of a drop can vary considerably depending on the viscosity and specific gravity of the fluid, as well as the size and shape of the vessel from which it is poured. (At the time, surface tension was not well understood.) The minim came with a set of procedures for ensuring accurate measurement, specifically, diluting powerful medicines that had previously been measured by the drop, then using a "minimometer" or "minim glass" (graduated pipette) with minim marks at regular intervals. The minim was defined as one 60th of a fluid dram or one 480th of a fluid ounce. This is equal to about 61.6 μL (U.S.) or 59.2 μL (Britain).

Pharmacists have since moved to metric measurements, with a drop being rounded to exactly 0.05 mL (50 μL, that is, 20 drops per milliliter). In hospitals, intravenous tubing is used to deliver medication in drops of various sizes ranging from 10 drops/mL to 60 drops/mL. A drop is abbreviated gtt, with gtts used for the plural, often seen on prescriptions. Other sources abbreviate gt for singular, and gtt for plural. These abbreviations come from gutta (plural guttae), the Latin word for drop.

== See also ==
- Drop (liquid)
