= Pinch (unit) =

Amount that can be taken between the thumb and forefinger

A pinch is a small, indefinite amount of a substance, typically a powder like salt, sugar, spice, or snuff. It is the "amount that can be taken between the thumb and forefinger".

Some manufacturers of measuring spoons and some U.S. cookbooks give more precise equivalents, typically 1/16 US customary teaspoon; some sources define it as 1/8 or 1/24 teaspoon. There is no generally accepted standard.

1 US customary pinch	=	1/48	US customary tablespoon
	=	1/32	US customary dessert spoon
	=	1/16	US customary teaspoon
	=	1/8	US customary coffee spoon
	=	1/2	US customary dash
	=	2	US customary smidgens
	≈	0·022	UK tablespoon
	≈	0·043	UK dessert spoon
	≈	0·087	UK teaspoon
	≈	0·17	UK salt spoon
	≈	0·35	UK pinch
	≈	0·02	international metric tablespoon
	≈	0·015	Australian metric tablespoon
	≈	0·031	metric dessert spoon
	≈	0·062	metric teaspoon

In the United Kingdom, a pinch is traditionally 1/2 UK salt spoon, the equivalence of 1/4 UK teaspoon. 1/2 UK salt spoon is an amount of space that can accommodate 15 British imperial minims (1/4 British imperial fluid drachm or 1/32 British imperial fluid ounce; about 14·41 US customary minims (0·24 US customary fluid dram or 0·03 US customary fluid ounce) or 0·89 millilitres) of liquid.

1 UK pinch	=	1/16	UK tablespoon
	=	1/8	UK dessert spoon
	=	1/4	UK teaspoon
	=	1/2	UK salt spoon
	≈	0·06	US customary tablespoon
	≈	0·09	US customary dessert spoon
	≈	0·18	US customary teaspoon
	≈	0·36	US customary coffee spoon
	≈	0·72	US customary salt spoon
	≈	1·44	US customary dashes
	≈	2·88	US customary pinches
	≈	5·76	US customary smidgens
	≈	0·059	international metric tablespoon
	≈	0·044	Australian metric tablespoon
	≈	0·089	metric dessert spoon
	≈	0·18	metric teaspoon
