= Tablespoon =

Kind of spoon and unit of volume

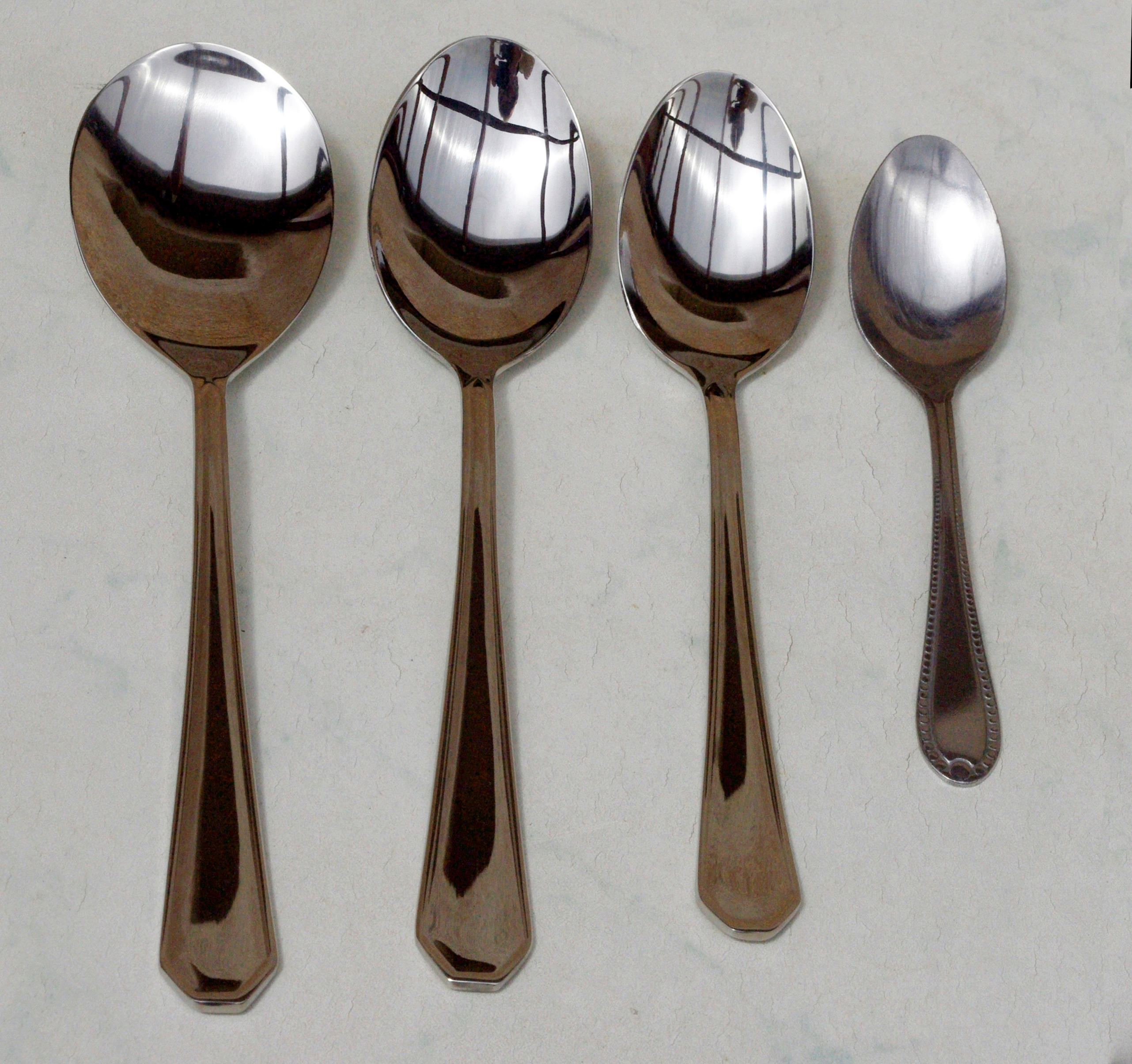
left-to-right: Serving spoon; Tablespoon (tbsp.); Dessert spoon (dsp.); Teaspoon (tsp.)

A tablespoon (tbsp., Tbsp., Tb., or T.) is a large spoon and a cooking measure of volume. In many English-speaking regions, the term now refers to a large spoon used for serving. In some regions, it is the largest type of spoon used for eating.

Several systems of units of measurement define a tablespoon. The international metric tablespoon, used in the UK and US is exactly 15 mL. An Australian metric tablespoon is 20 mL. The United States customary liquid tablespoon is 1/2 US fluid ounce, approximately 14.8 mL; A British tablespoon was exactly 1/2 imperial fluid ounce, approximately 14.2 mL.

The capacity of the utensil, as opposed to the measurement, is defined by neither law nor custom but only by preferences, and may or may not significantly approximate the measurement.

== Dining ==
Before about 1700, it was customary for Europeans to bring their own spoons to the table. Spoons were carried as personal property in much the same way as people today carry wallets, key rings, etc. From about 1700 the place setting became popular, and with it the "table-spoon" (hyphenated), "table-fork" and "table-knife". Around the same time the tea-spoon and dessert-spoon first appeared. The table-spoon was reserved for eating soup. The 18th century witnessed a proliferation of different sorts of spoons, including the mustard-spoon, salt-spoon, coffee-spoon, and soup-spoon.

In the late 19th century UK, the dessert-spoon and soup-spoon began to displace the table-spoon as the primary implement for eating from a bowl, at which point the name "table-spoon" took on a secondary meaning as a much larger serving spoon. In 1928, when the first edition of the Oxford English Dictionary was published, "tablespoon", which by then was no longer hyphenated, still had two definitions in the UK: the original definition (eating spoon) and the new definition (serving spoon).

Victorian and Edwardian era tablespoons used in the UK are often 25 mL, about 0.88 imperial fluid ounce or 0.85 US fluid ounce, or sometimes larger. They are used only for preparing and serving food, not as part of a place-setting. Common tablespoons intended for use as cutlery, called dessert spoons in the UK, where a tablespoon is always a serving spoon, usually hold 7–14 mL, about 0.25–0.49 imperial fluid ounce or 0.24–0.47 US fluid ounce, considerably less than some tablespoons used for serving.

== Culinary measure ==
tablespoon
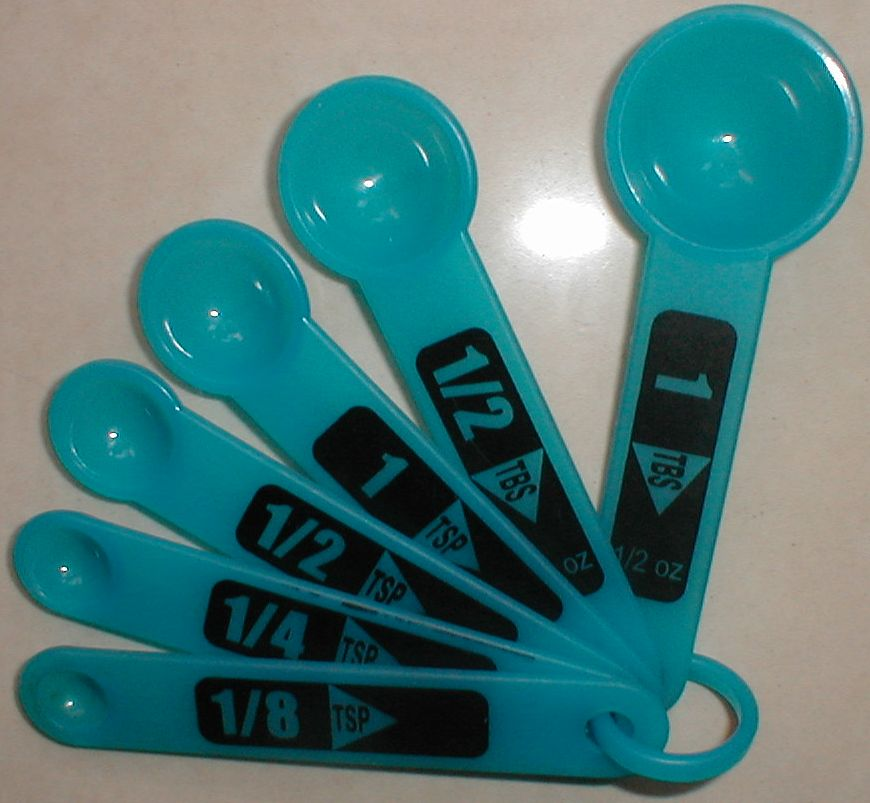
- Measuring spoons, with the largest one representing the volume of a tablespoon.

General information
- Unit system: Imperial units, US customary units
- Unit of: Volume
- Symbol: tbsp

Conversions (imperial)
1 imp tbsp in ...	... is equal to ...
- SI units: 14.207 mL
- US customary units: 0.961 US tbsp

Conversions (US)
1 US tbsp in ...	... is equal to ...
- SI units: 14.787 mL
- Imperial units: 1.041 imp tbsp

=== Naming ===
In recipes, an abbreviation like tbsp. is usually used to refer to a tablespoon, to differentiate it from the smaller teaspoon (tsp.). Some authors capitalize the abbreviation, as Tbsp., while leaving tsp. in lower case, to emphasize that the larger tablespoon, rather than the smaller teaspoon, is wanted. The tablespoon abbreviation is sometimes abbreviated to Tb. or T.

=== Traditional definitions ===
In most places, one tablespoon equals three teaspoons. In Australia, one tablespoon equals four teaspoons.

==== International metric ====
An international metric tablespoon is exactly equal to 15 mL. It is the equivalence of 1 1/2 metric dessert spoons or 3 metric teaspoons.

1 international metric tablespoon	=	15	mL
	=	3/4	Australian metric tablespoon
	=	1 1/2	metric dessert spoons
	=	3	metric teaspoons
	≈	4.22	British imperial fluid drachm
	≈	0.53	British imperial fluid ounce
	≈	1.06	UK tablespoons
	≈	2.11	UK dessert spoons
	≈	4.22	UK teaspoons
	≈	8.45	UK salt spoons
	≈	16.89	UK pinches (solids only)
	≈	253.41	UK drops (liquids only)
	≈	4.06	US customary fluid drams
	≈	0.51	US customary fluid ounce
	≈	1.01	US customary tablespoons
	≈	1.52	US customary dessert spoons
	≈	3.04	US customary teaspoons
	≈	6.09	US customary coffee spoons
	≈	12.17	US customary salt spoons
	≈	24.35	US customary dashes (solids only)
	≈	48.69	US customary pinches (solids only)
	≈	97.39	US customary smidgens (solids only)
	≈	292.16	US customary drops (liquids only)

==== Australian metric ====
The Australian metric tablespoon is different from that of the rest of the world. The Australian official definition of the tablespoon as a unit of volume is:

1 Australian metric tablespoon	= 20 mL
	= 1 1/3 international metric tablespoons
	= 2 metric dessert spoons (1 metric dessert spoon = 10 mL each)
	= 4 metric teaspoons (1 metric teaspoon = 5 mL each)
	≈ 5.63 British imperial fluid drachms
	≈ 0.7 British imperial fluid ounce
	≈ 1.41 UK tablespoons
	≈ 2.82 UK dessert spoons
	≈ 4.12 UK teaspoons
	≈ 11.26 UK salt spoons
	≈ 22.52 UK pinches (solids only)
	≈ 337.87 UK drops (liquids only)
	≈ 5.41 US customary fluid drams
	≈ 0.67 US customary fluid ounce
	≈ 1.35 US customary tablespoons
	≈ 2.03 US customary dessert spoons
	≈ 4.06 US customary teaspoons
	≈ 4.06 US customary coffee spoons
	≈ 16.23 US customary salt spoons
	≈ 32.46 US customary dashes (solids only)
	≈ 64.92 US customary pinches (solids only)
	≈ 129.85 US customary smidgens (solids only)
	≈ 389.54 US customary drops (liquids only)

This definition was promulgated by the Metric Conversion Board in the 1970s, as part of the country's metrication process. There is not a distinct Australian metric dessert spoon or metric teaspoon.

==== United Kingdom ====
1 UK tablespoon	=	4	British imperial fluid drachm
	=	2	UK dessert spoons
	=	4	UK teaspoons
	=	8	UK salt spoons
	=	16	UK pinches (solids only)
	=	240	UK drops (liquids only)
	=	1/2	British imperial fluid ounce
	≈	3.84	US customary fluid drams
	≈	0.48	US customary fluid ounce
	≈	0.96	US customary tablespoon
	≈	1.44	US customary dessert spoons
	≈	2.88	US customary teaspoons
	≈	5.76	US customary coffee spoons
	≈	11.53	US customary salt spoons
	≈	23.06	US customary dashes (solids only)
	≈	46.12	US customary pinches (solids only)
	≈	92.23	US customary smidgens (solids only)
	≈	276.70	US customary drops (liquids only)
	≈	14.207	millilitres
	≈	0.95	international metric tablespoon
	≈	0.71	Australian metric tablespoon
	≈	1.42	metric dessert spoons
	≈	2.84	metric teaspoons

==== United States ====
The traditional U.S. interpretation of the tablespoon as a unit of volume is:

1 US customary tablespoon	= 4 US fluid drams
	= 1 1/2 US customary dessert spoons
	= 3 US customary teaspoons
	= 6 US customary coffee spoons
	= 12 US customary salt spoons
	= 24 US customary dashes (solids only)
	= 48 US customary pinches (solids only)
	= 96 US customary smidgens (solids only)
	= 288 US customary drops (liquids only)
	= 1/2 US fluid ounce
	≈ 4.16 British imperial fluid drachms
	≈ 0.52 British imperial fluid ounce
	≈ 1.04 UK tablespoons
	≈ 2.08 UK dessert spoons
	≈ 4.16 UK teaspoons
	≈ 8.33 UK salt spoons
	≈ 16.65 UK pinches (solids only)
	≈ 249.8 UK drops (liquids only)
	≈ 14.8 mL
	≈ 0.99 international metric tablespoon
	≈ 0.74 Australian metric tablespoon
	≈ 1.48 metric dessert spoons
	≈ 2.96 metric teaspoons

In nutrition labeling in the U.S., a tablespoon is defined as 15 mL, about 4.22 British imperial fluid drachms (0.53 British imperial fluid ounce) or 4.06 US customary fluid drams, 0.51 US customary fluid ounce.

=== Dry measure ===
For dry ingredients, if a recipe calls for a level tablespoon, the usual meaning without further qualification, is measured by filling the spoon and scraping it level. In contrast, a heaped, heaping, or rounded spoonful is not leveled off, and includes a heap above the spoon. The exact volume of a heaped tablespoon depends somewhat on the shape and curvature of the measuring spoon being used and largely upon the physical properties of the substance being measured, and so is not a precise unit of measurement. If neither a rounded nor a level tablespoon is specified, a level tablespoon is used, just as a cup of flour is a level cup unless otherwise specified.

== Apothecary measure ==
In the 18th century, the table-spoon became an unofficial unit of the apothecaries' system of measures, equal to 4 drams (1/2 fl oz, 14.8 mL). It was more commonly known by the Latin name cochleare majus (abbreviated cochl. maj.) or, in apothecaries' notation, f℥ss or f℥ß (fluid ℥, i.e. ounce, semis, one-half).

== See also ==
- Dessert spoon
- Teaspoon
- Fork
