= Dessert spoon =

Spoon designed for eating dessert

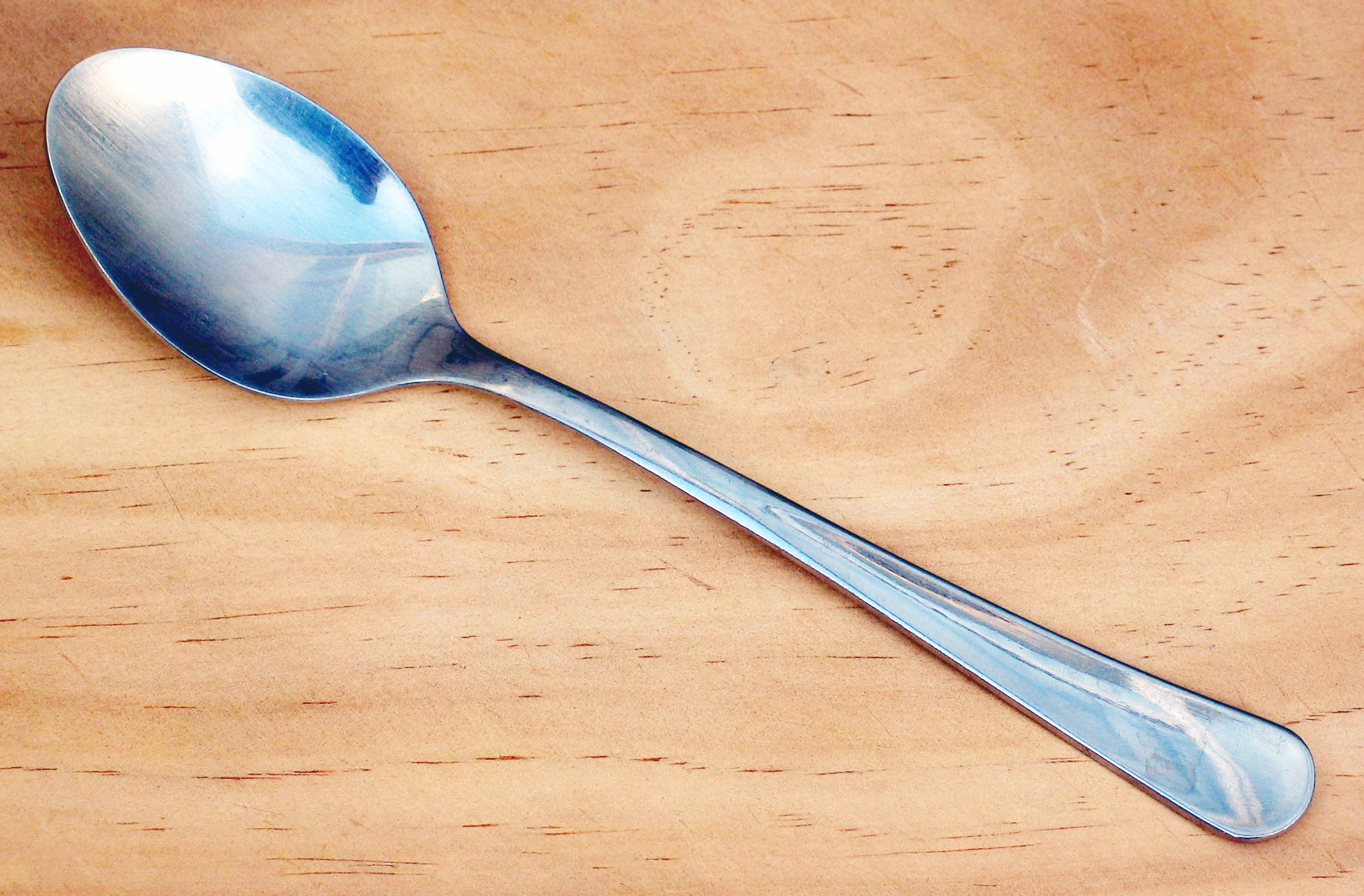
Dessert spoon

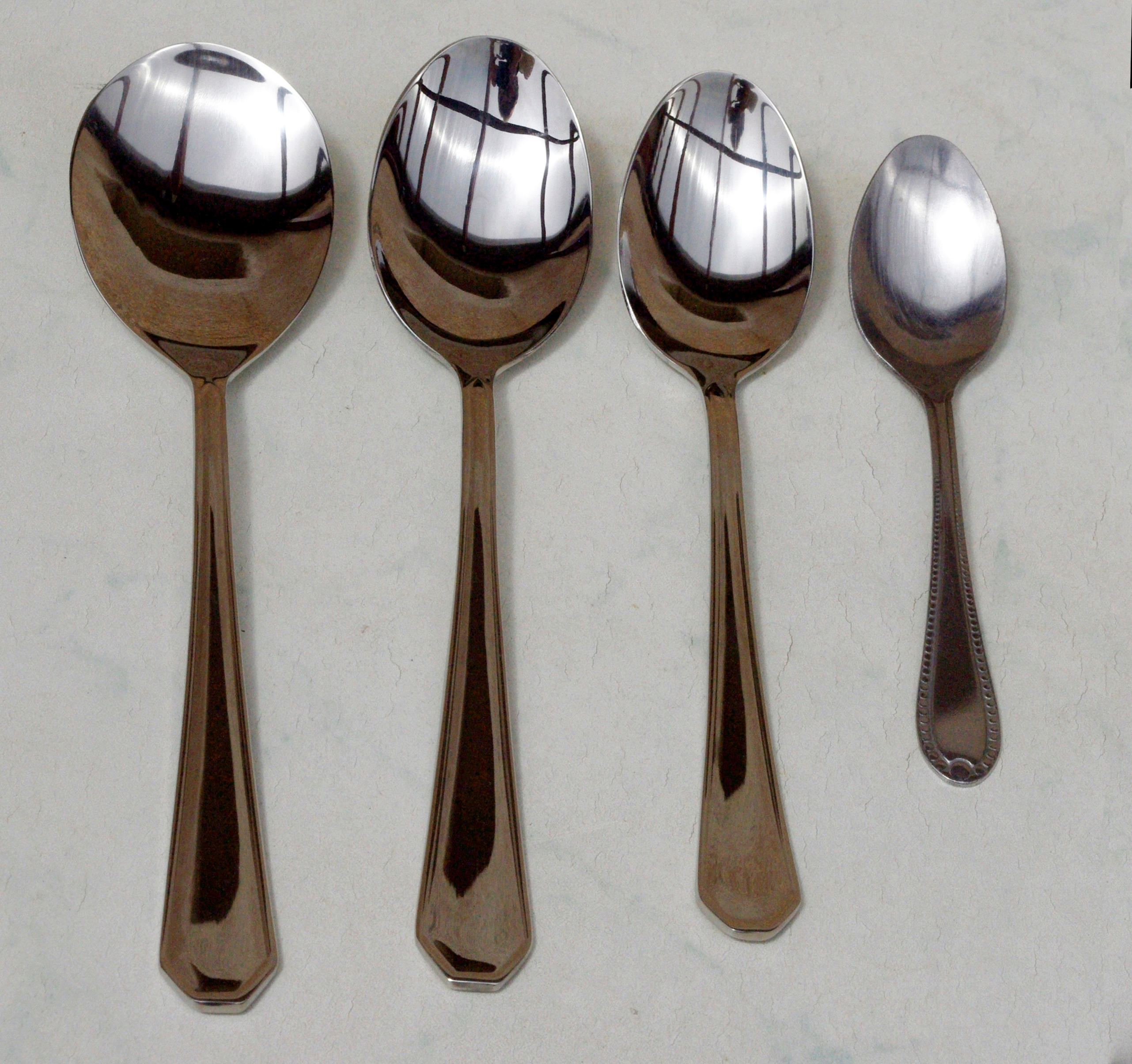
left-to-right: Serving spoon; Tablespoon (tbsp.); Dessert spoon (dsp.); Teaspoon (tsp.)

A dessert spoon is a spoon designed specifically for eating dessert. Similar in size to a soup spoon (intermediate between a teaspoon and a tablespoon) but with an oval rather than round bowl, it typically has a capacity around twice that of a teaspoon.

By extension, the term "dessert spoon" is used as a cooking measure of volume, usually of 10 millilitres (mL), 1/3 US fl oz, or 1/4 imp fl oz.

== Dining ==
The use of dessert spoons around the world varies massively; in some areas they are very common, while in other places the use of the dessert spoon is almost unheard of—with diners using forks or teaspoons for their desserts as a default.

In most traditional table settings, the dessert spoon is placed above the plate or bowl, separated from the rest of the cutlery, or it may simply be brought in with the dessert.

== Culinary measure ==
As a unit of culinary measure, in the United States, a level dessert spoon (dsp., dspn. or dstspn.) equals 2 US customary teaspoons, which is 2 2/3 US customary fluid drams (1/3 of a US customary fluid ounce).

1 US customary dessert spoon	=	2 2/3	US customary fluid drams
	=	1/3	US customary fluid ounce
	=	2/3	US customary tablespoons
	=	2	US customary teaspoons
	=	4	US customary coffee spoons
	=	8	US customary salt spoons
	=	16	US customary dashes (solids only)
	=	32	US customary pinches (solids only)
	=	64	US customary smidgens (solids only)
	=	192	US customary drops (liquids only)
	≈	2·78	British imperial fluid drachms
	≈	0·35	British imperial fluid ounce
	≈	0·69	UK tablespoon
	≈	1·39	UK dessert spoons
	≈	2·78	UK teaspoons
	≈	5·55	UK salt spoons
	≈	11·1	UK pinches (solid only)
	≈	166·53	UK drops (liquids only)
	≈	9·86	millilitres
	≈	0·66	international metric tablespoon
	≈	0·49	Australian metric tablespoon
	≈	0·99	metric dessert spoon
	≈	1·97	metric teaspoons

In the United Kingdom, a dessert spoon is traditionally 2 British imperial fluid drachms (1/4 of a British imperial fluid ounce). 1 UK dessert spoon is the equivalence of 1/2 UK tablespoon, 2 UK teaspoons, or 4 UK salt spoons.

1 UK dessert spoon	=	2	British imperial fluid drachms
	=	1/2	UK tablespoon
	=	2	UK teaspoons
	=	4	UK salt spoons
	=	8	UK pinches (solids only)
	=	120	UK drops (liquids only)
	=	1/4	British imperial fluid ounce
	≈	1·92	US customary fluid drams
	≈	0·24	US customary fluid ounce
	≈	0·48	US customary tablespoon
	≈	0·72	US customary dessert spoon
	≈	1·44	US customary teaspoons
	≈	2·88	US customary coffee spoons
	≈	5·76	US customary salt spoons
	≈	11·53	US customary dashes (solids only)
	≈	23·06	US customary pinches (solids only)
	≈	46·12	US customary smidgens (solids only)
	≈	138·35	US customary drops (liquids only)
	≈	7·10	millilitres
	≈	0·47	international metric tablespoon
	≈	0·36	Australian metric tablespoon
	≈	0·71	metric dessert spoon
	≈	1·42	metric teaspoons

A metric dessert spoon is 10mL, the equivalence of 2 metric teaspoons.

1 metric dessert spoon	=	10	mL
	=	2/3	international metric tablespoon
	=	1/2	Australian metric tablespoon
	=	2	metric teaspoons
	≈	2·81	British imperial fluid drachms
	≈	0·35	British imperial fluid ounce
	≈	0·7	UK tablespoon
	≈	1·41	UK dessert spoons
	≈	2·81	UK teaspoons
	≈	5·63	UK salt spoons
	≈	11·26	UK pinches (solids only)
	≈	168·94	UK drops (liquids only)
	≈	2·71	US customary fluid drams
	≈	0·34	US customary fluid ounce
	≈	0·68	US customary tablespoons
	≈	1·01	US customary dessert spoons
	≈	2·03	US customary teaspoons
	≈	4·06	US customary coffee spoons
	≈	8·12	US customary salt spoons
	≈	16·23	US customary dashes (solids only)
	≈	32·46	US customary pinches (solids only)
	≈	64·92	US customary smidgens (solids only)
	≈	194·77	US customary drops (liquids only)

== Apothecary measure ==
As a unit of Apothecary measure, the dessert-spoon was an unofficial but widely used unit of fluid measure equal to two fluid drams, or 1/4 fluid ounce. However, even when approximated, its use was discouraged: "Inasmuch as spoons vary greatly in capacity, and from their form are unfit for use in the dosage of medicine, it is desirable... to be measured with a suitable medicine measure."

In the United States and pre-1824 England, the fluid ounce was 1/128 of a Queen Anne wine gallon (which was defined as exactly 231 cubic inches) thus making the dessert-spoon approximately 7.39 ml. The post-1824 (British) imperial Apothecaries' dessert-spoon was also 1/4 fluid ounce, but the ounce in question was 1/160 of an imperial gallon, approximately 277.4 cubic inches, yielding a dessert-spoon of approximately 7.10 ml.

In both the British and American variants of the Apothecaries' system, two tea-spoons make a dessert-spoon, while two dessert-spoons make a table-spoon. In pharmaceutical Latin, the Apothecaries' dessert-spoon is known as cochleare medium, abbreviated as cochl. med. or less frequently coch. med., as opposed to the tea-spoon (cochleare minus or minimum) and table-spoon (cochleare magis or magnum).

== See also ==
- Cooking weights and measures
- Teaspoon
- Tablespoon
