= Minim (unit) =

Unit of volume

The minim (abbreviated min) is a unit of volume in both the imperial and U.S. customary systems of measurement. Specifically, in the imperial system, it is 1/60 of an imperial fluid drachm or 1/480 of an imperial fluid ounce; in the U.S. customary system, it is 1/60 of a US customary fluid dram or 1/480 of a US customary fluid ounce.

The minim was introduced in the 1809 edition of The Pharmacopœia of the Royal College of Physicians of London as a replacement for the drop, which had previously been the smallest unit of the apothecaries' system. It was observed that the size of a drop can vary considerably depending upon the viscosity and specific gravity of the liquid. (At the time, the phenomenon of surface tension was not well understood.) The minim, on the other hand, was measured with a graduated glass tube known as a "minimometer", later known as the minim-tube. The minim-tube was a type of graduated pipette, a device invented in 1791 by François-Antoine-Henri Descroizilles.

Apothecaries' measures are fully defined in the United Kingdom's Weights and Measures Act 1878, but the UK's Weights and Measures Act 1963 provided for the abolition of the minim, fluid scruple, and fluid drachm, all already obsolete. Actual delegalization occurred on 1 February 1971.

The use of the minim, along with other such measures, has been reduced by the adoption of the metric system, and even in the least metricated countries, pharmacy is largely metricated and the apothecaries' system is deprecated. The unit may rarely persist in some countries in the measurement of dosages of medicine.

== Definitions ==
Imperial minim	US customary minim
1/480 imperial fluid ounce	1/480 US fluid ounce
1/60 UK teaspoon	1/80 US teaspoon
1/60 imperial fluid drachm	1/60 US fluid dram
59.1938802083̅ microlitres (exactly)	61.611519921875 microlitres (exactly)
≃ 0.0036122322 cubic inches	77/20480 cubic inch (exactly)
≃ 0.002001583 US fluid ounces	≃ 0.002168422 imperial fluid ounces
≈ 0.96076 US fluid minims	≈ 1.0408427 imperial minims
