= Cubic mile =

Rarely used unit of volume

cubic mile
- Unit system: Imperial and US customary
- Unit of: Volume
- Symbol: mi^{3}, cu mi

Conversions
1 mi^{3} in ...	... is equal to ...
- Imperial/US: 1.4720×10^{11} ft^{3}; 5.4518×10^{9} yd^{3}
- SI units: 4.1682×10^{9} m^{3}; 4.1682 km^{3}

A cubic mile (abbreviation: cu mi or mi^{3}) is an imperial and US customary (non-SI non-metric) unit of volume, used in the United States, Canada and the United Kingdom. It is defined as the volume of a cube with sides of 1 mile (1.6 km) length, giving a volume of 1 cubic mile (4.2 km^{3}).

== Conversions ==
1 cubic mile	=	512	cubic furlongs
	≈	5.45 billion	cubic yards
	≈	147 billion	cubic feet
	≈	3.38 million	acre-feet
	≈	1.13 million	acre-yards
	=	640	acre-miles
	=	4.168181825440579584	cubic kilometres
	≈	917 billion	imperial gallons
	≈	1.1 trillion	US liquid gallons
	≈	115 billion	imperial bushels
	≈	118 billion	US bushels
	≈	26.2 billion	crude barrels
	≈	35 billion	US beer barrels

== See also ==
- Square mile
- Orders of magnitude for a comparison with other volumes
- Conversion of units § Volume
- Cube (arithmetic)
  - Cube root
  - Cubic equation
  - Cubic function
