= Orders of magnitude (volume) =

Comparison of a wide range of volumes

The table lists various objects and units by the order of magnitude of their volume.

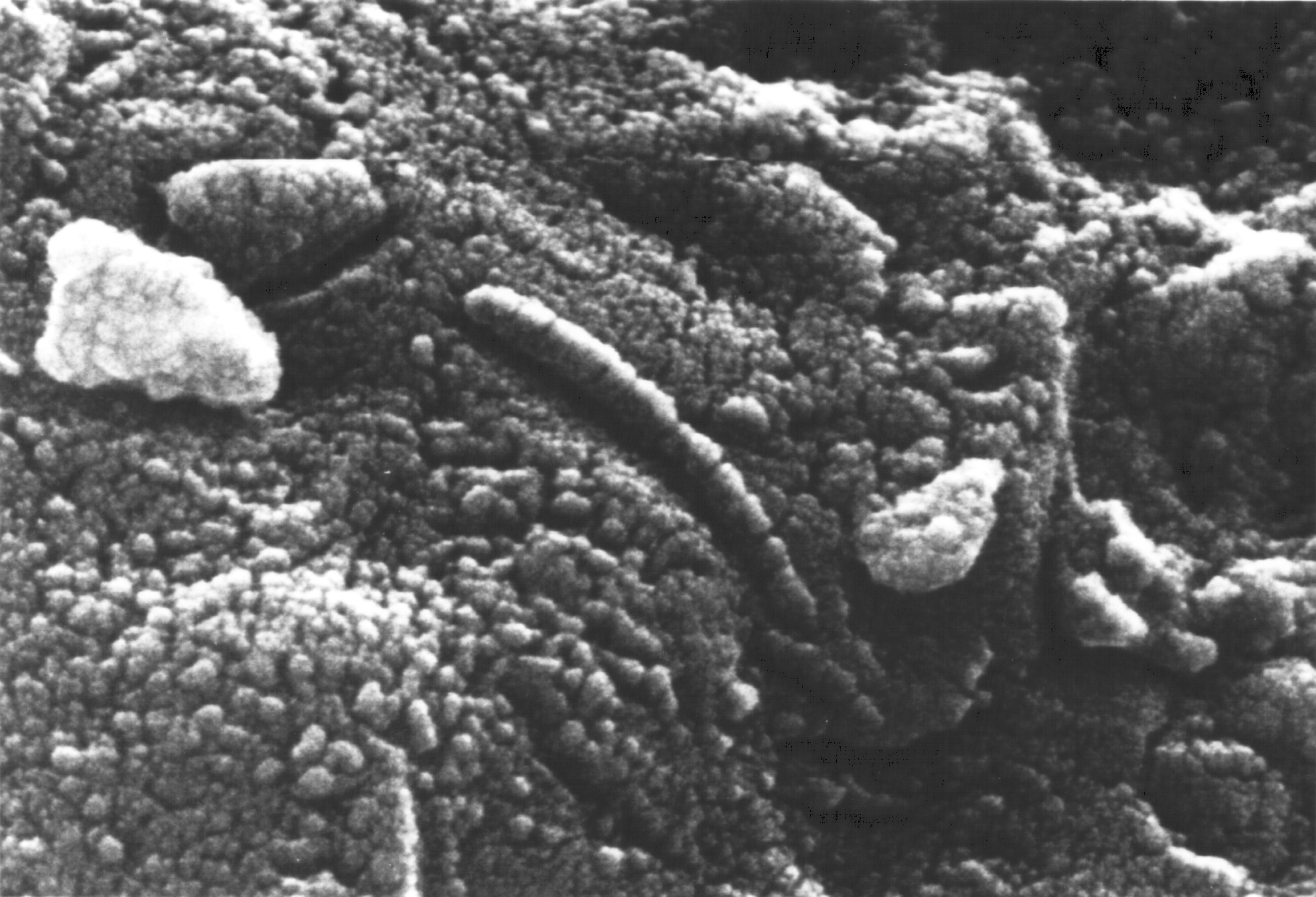
Chain structures in meteorite fragment ALH84001

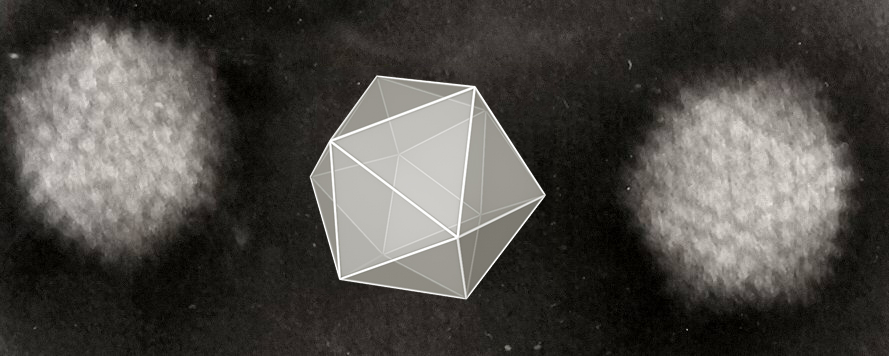
Electron micrograph of icosahedral adenovirus

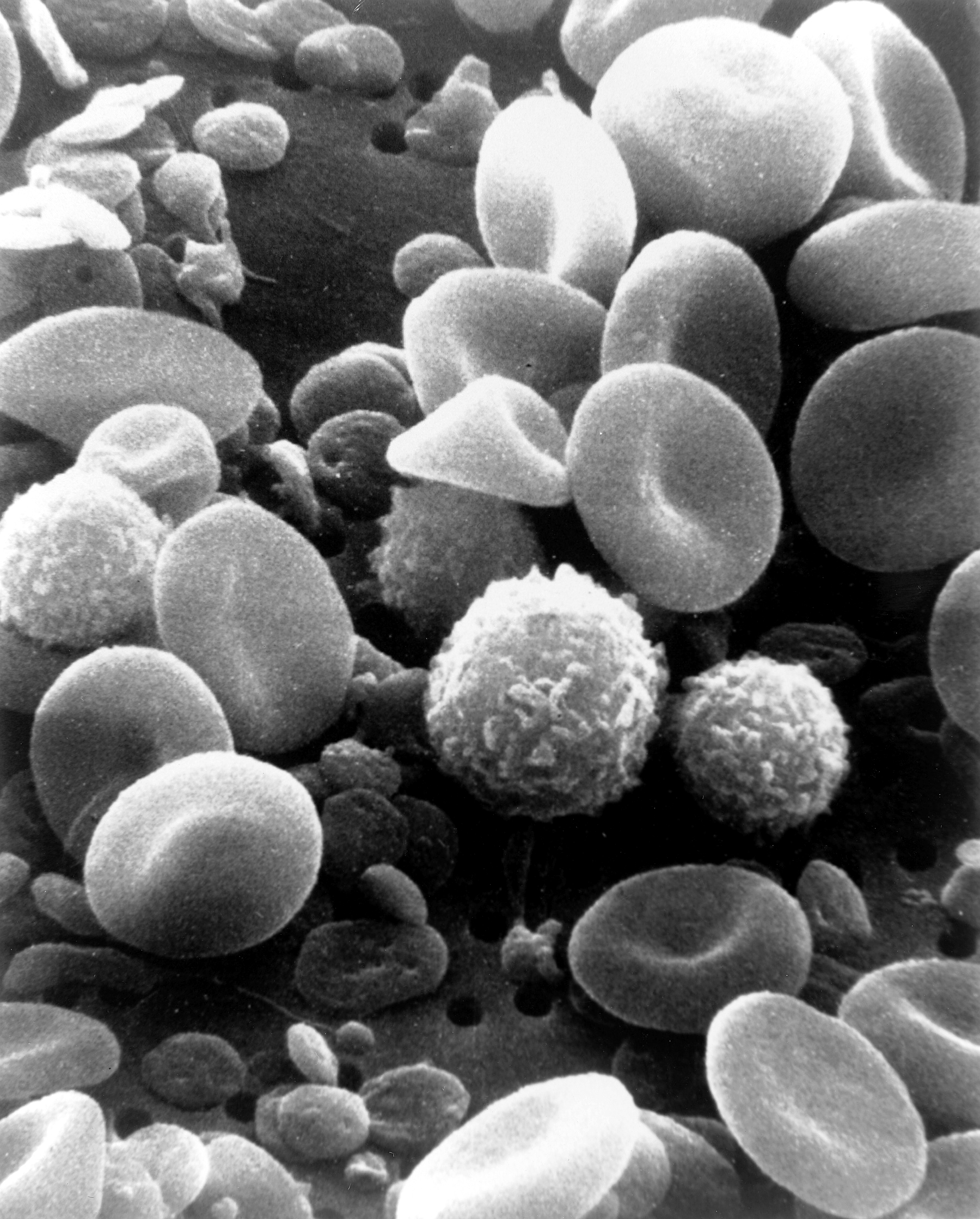
A scanning electron microscope image of normal circulating human blood showing red blood cells, several knobbly white blood cells including lymphocytes, a monocyte, a neutrophil and many small disc-shaped platelets

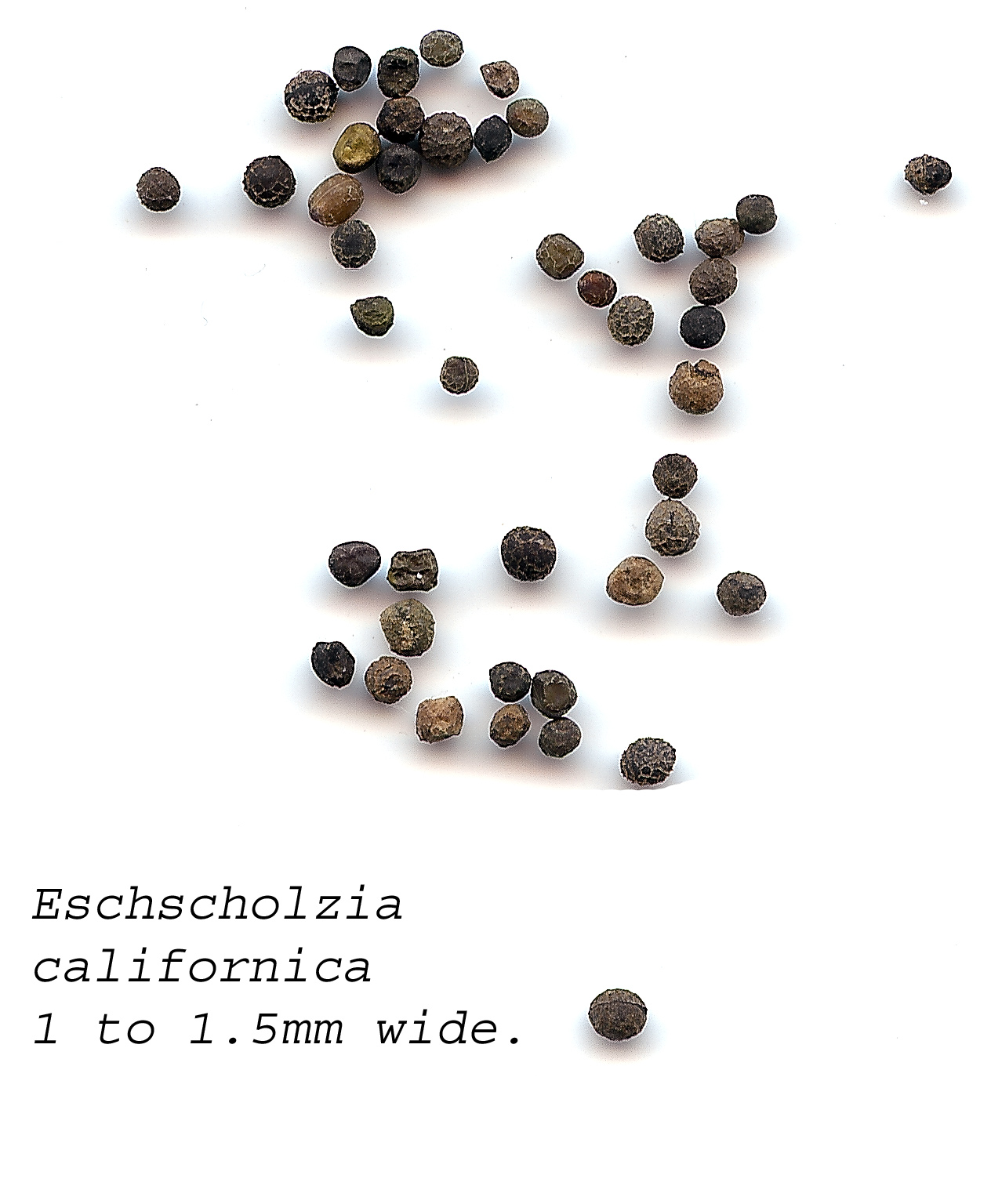
California poppy seeds

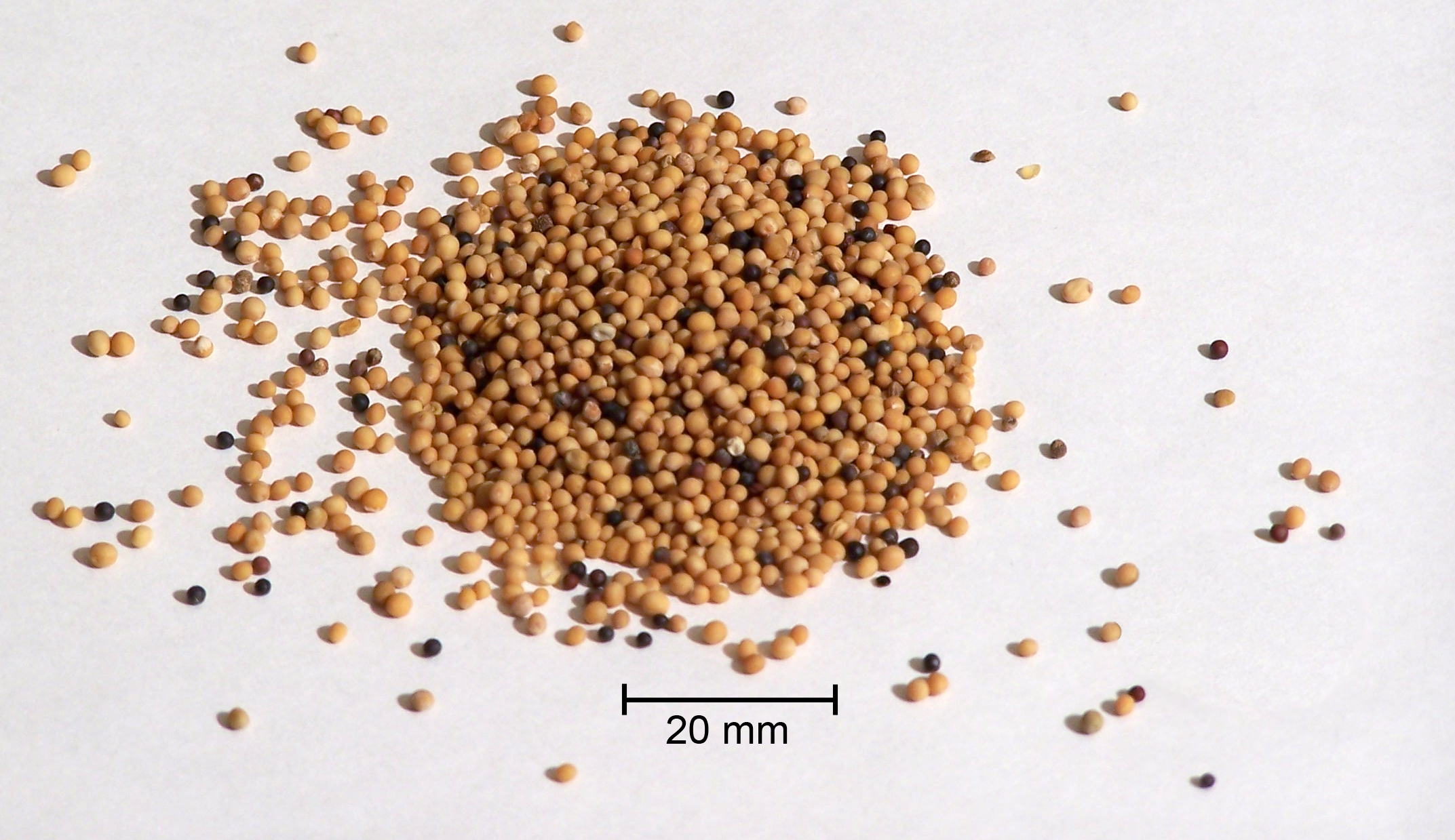
Mustard seeds

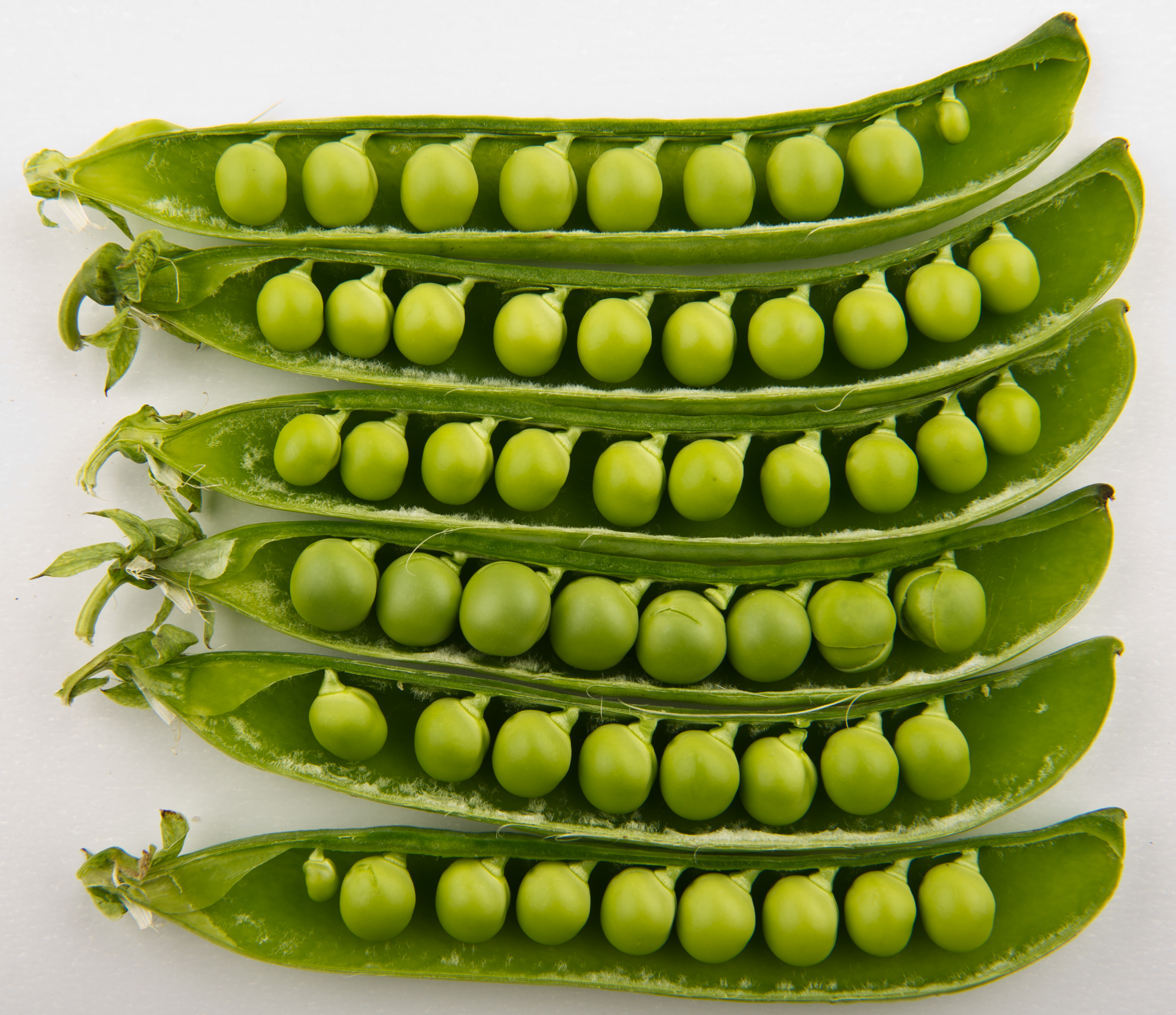
Peas in pods

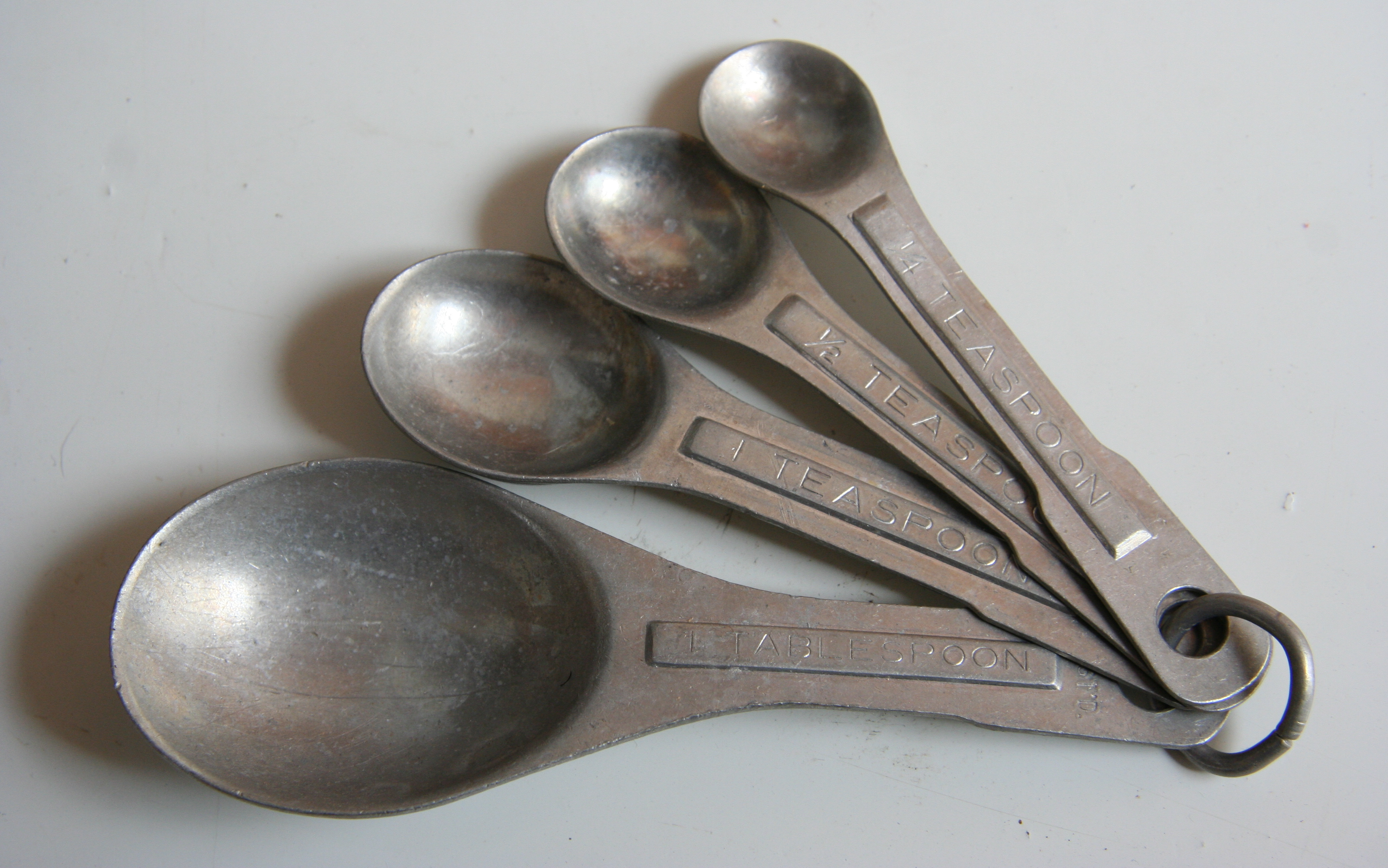
Measuring spoons of 1 tbsp (15 mL) and 1, 1/2 and 1/4 teaspoon

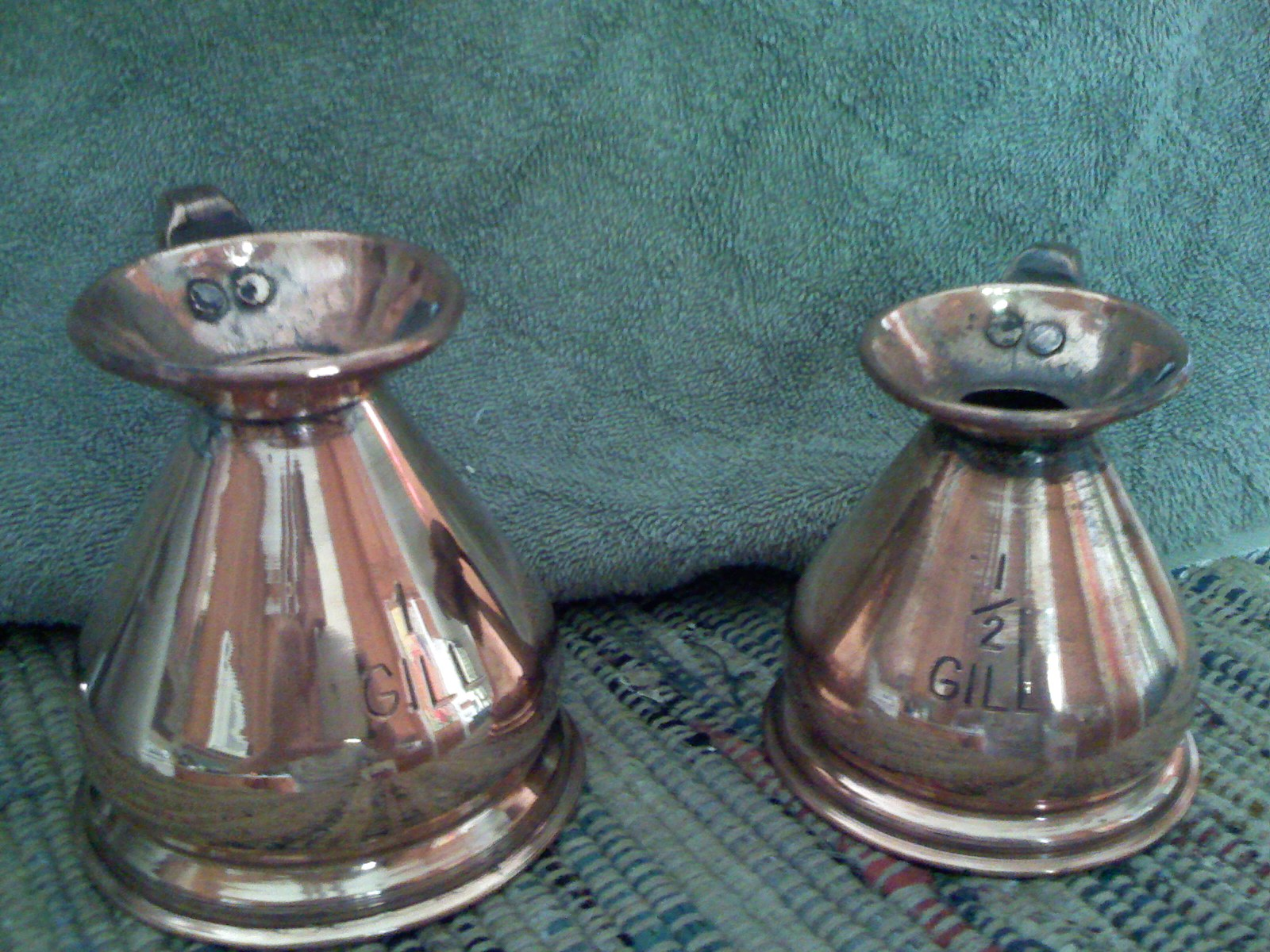
Copper measuring jugs of 1 and 1/2 gill

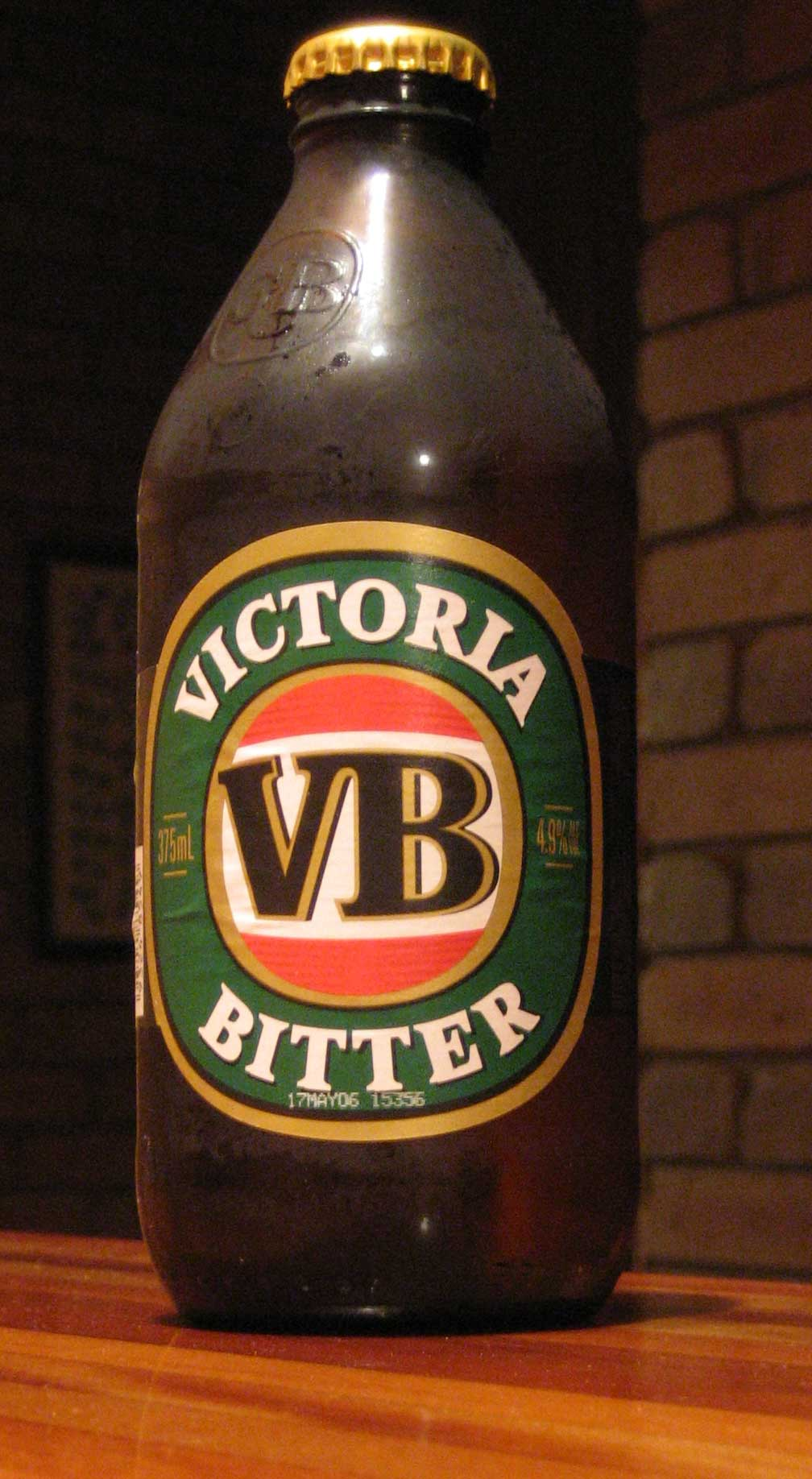
375 mL stubbie of beer

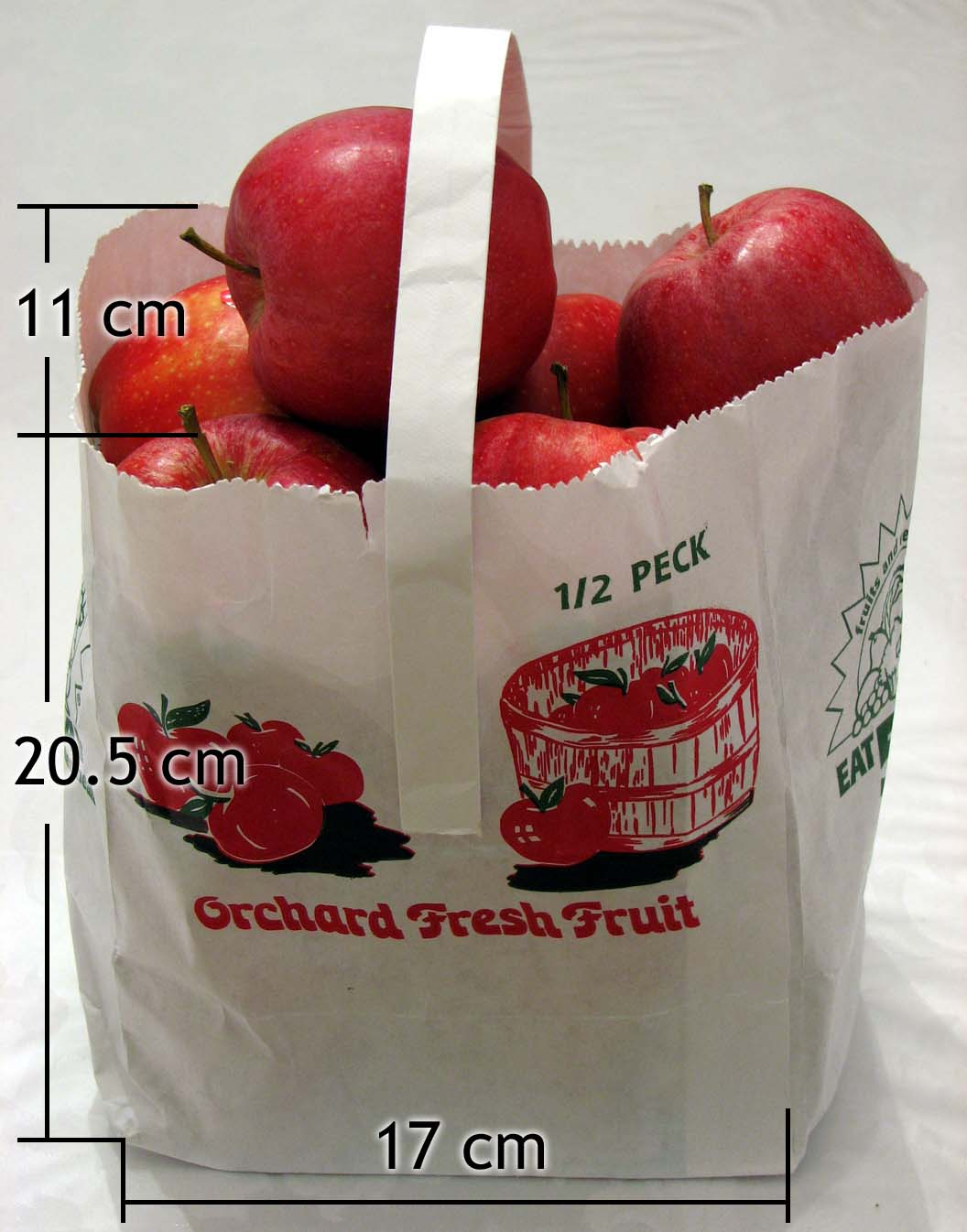
A 1/2-peck apple bag

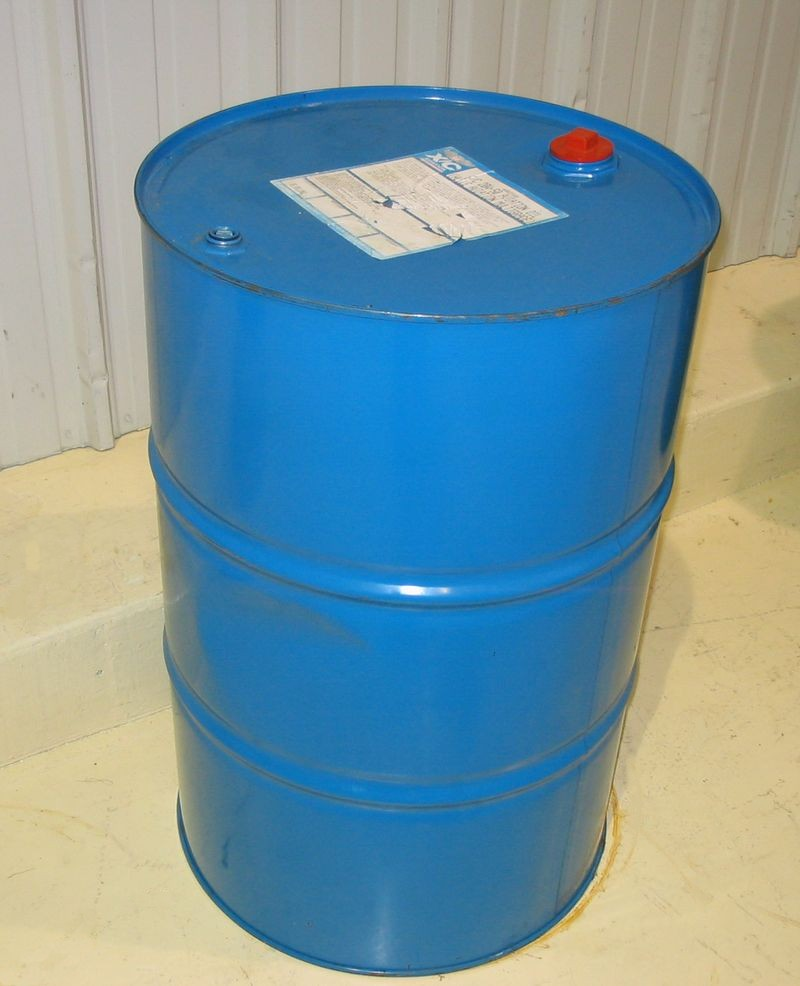
A standard 200-litre (55 US or 44 imp gal) drum

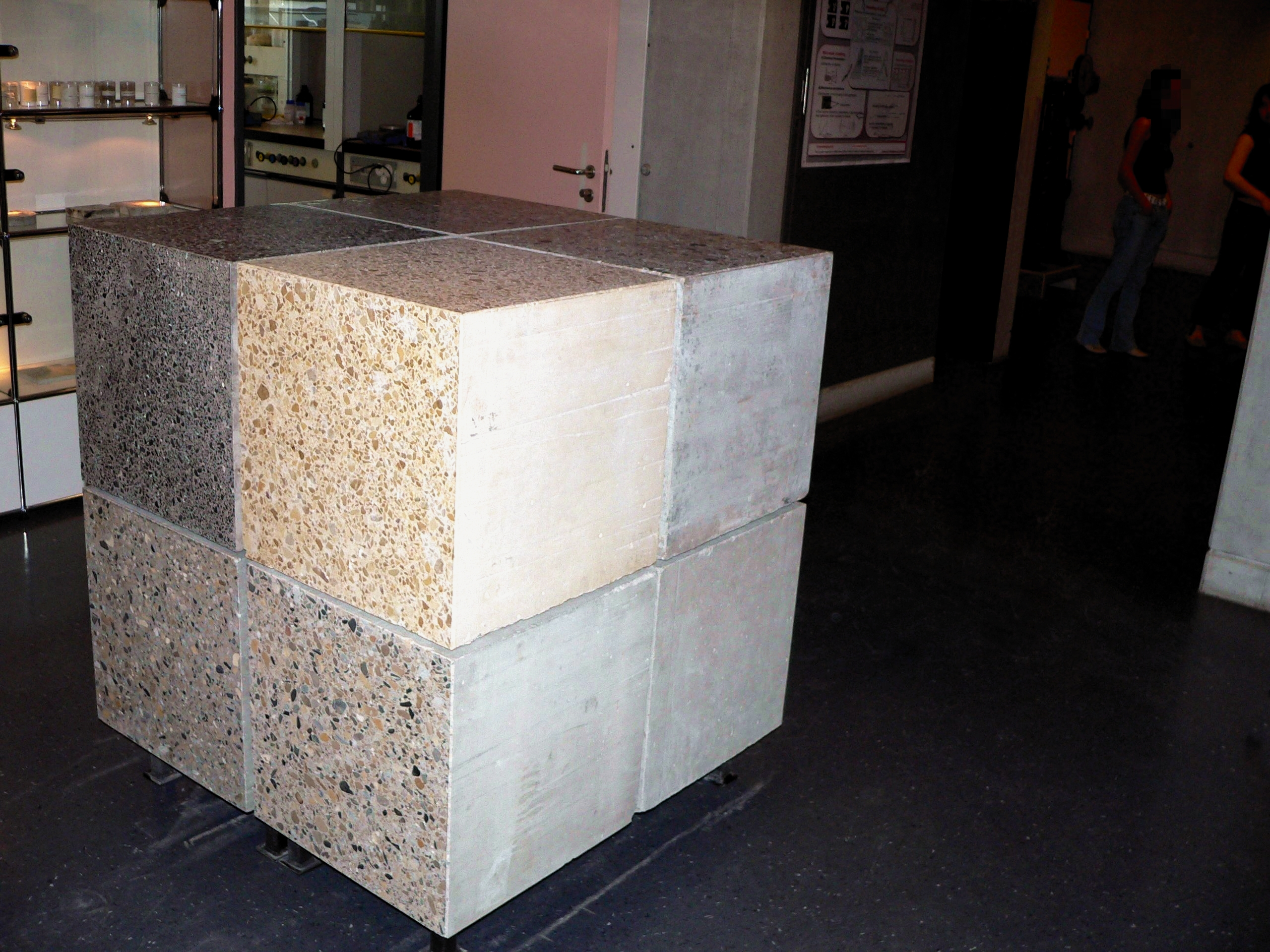
A cubic metre of concrete

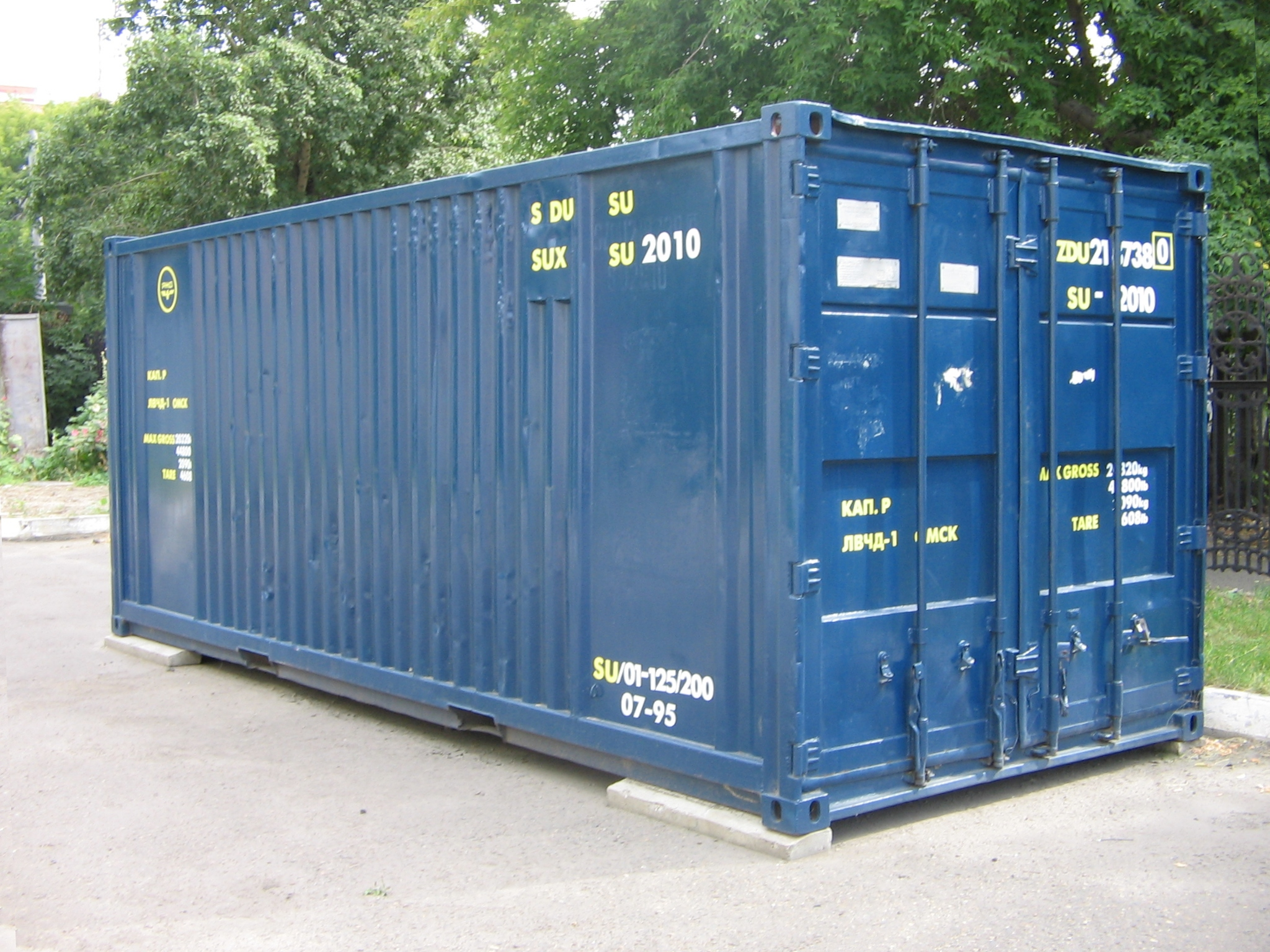
A TEU container

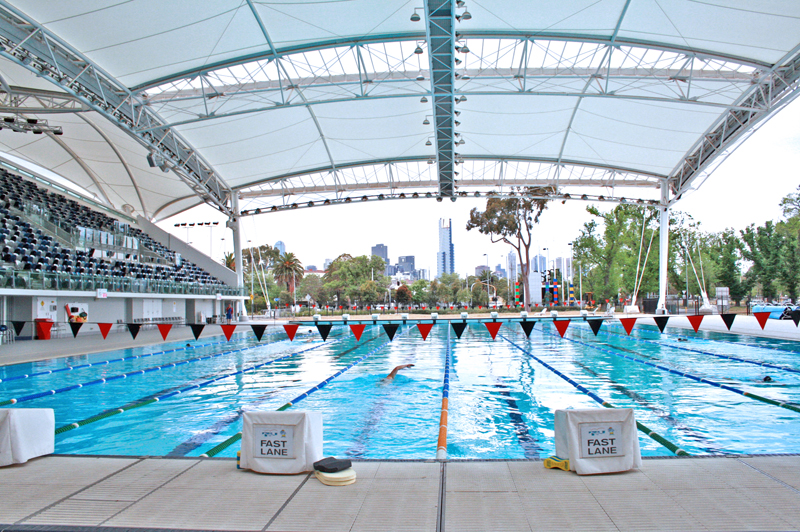
An Olympic swimming pool

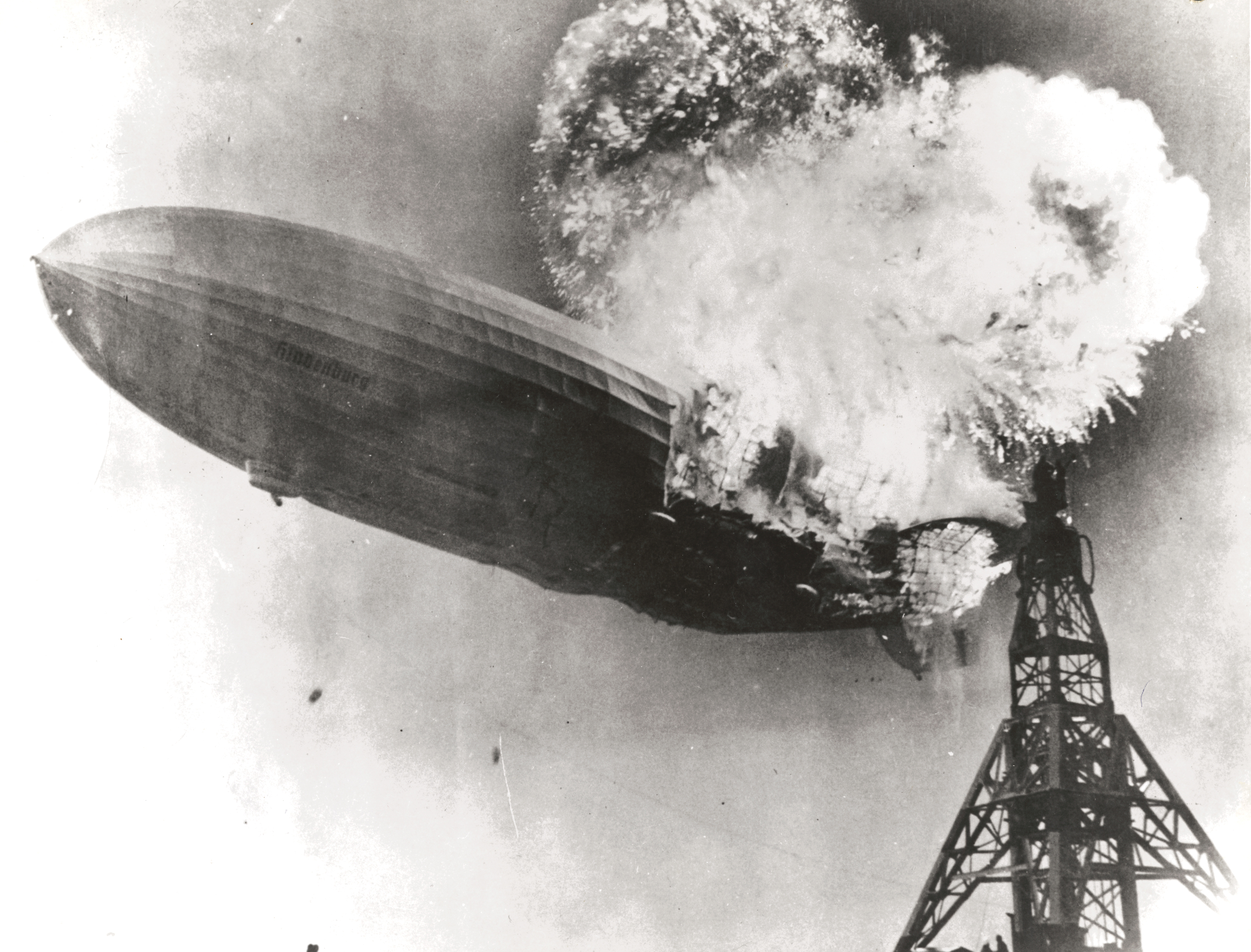
LZ 129 Hindenburg

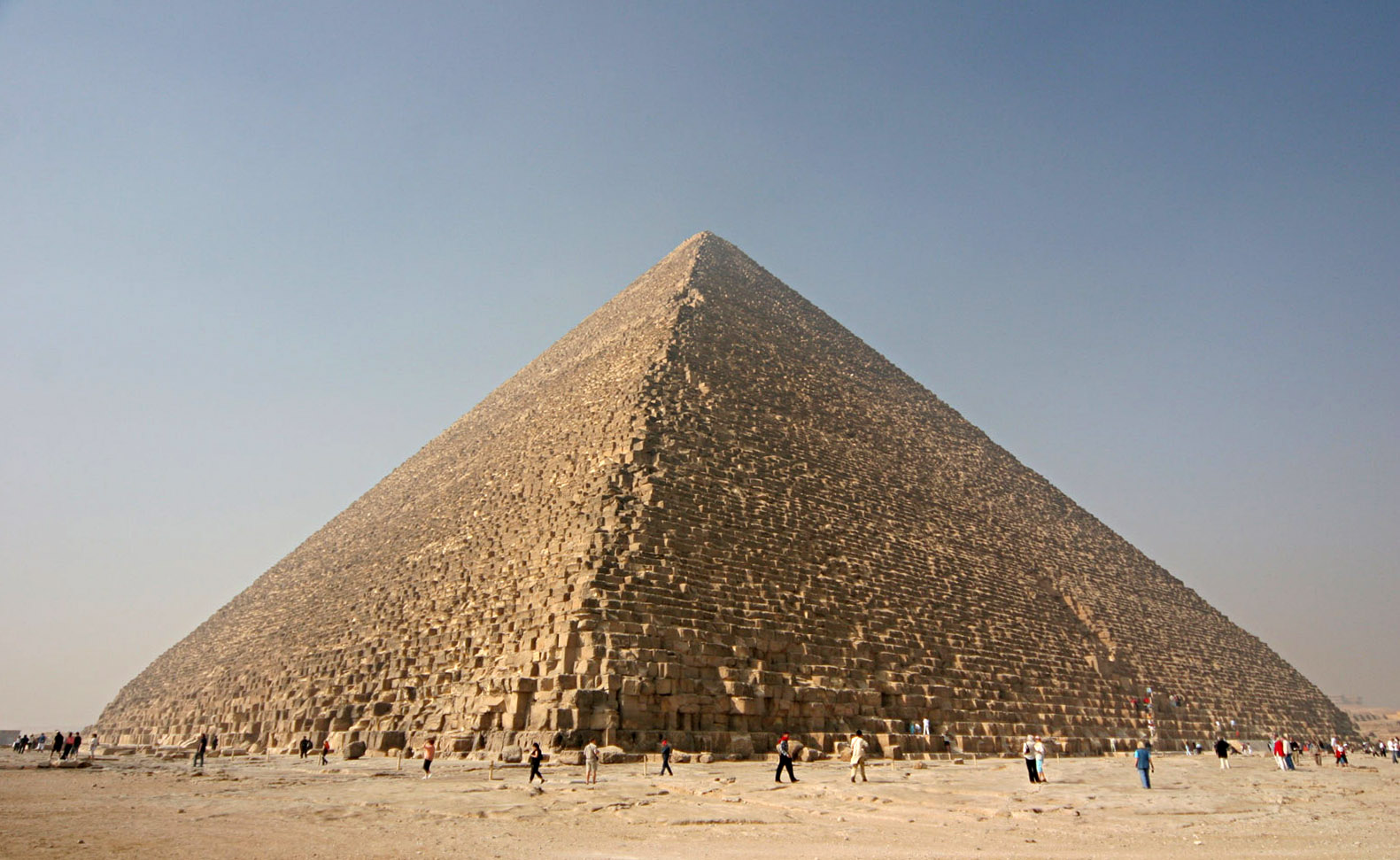
Great Pyramid of Giza

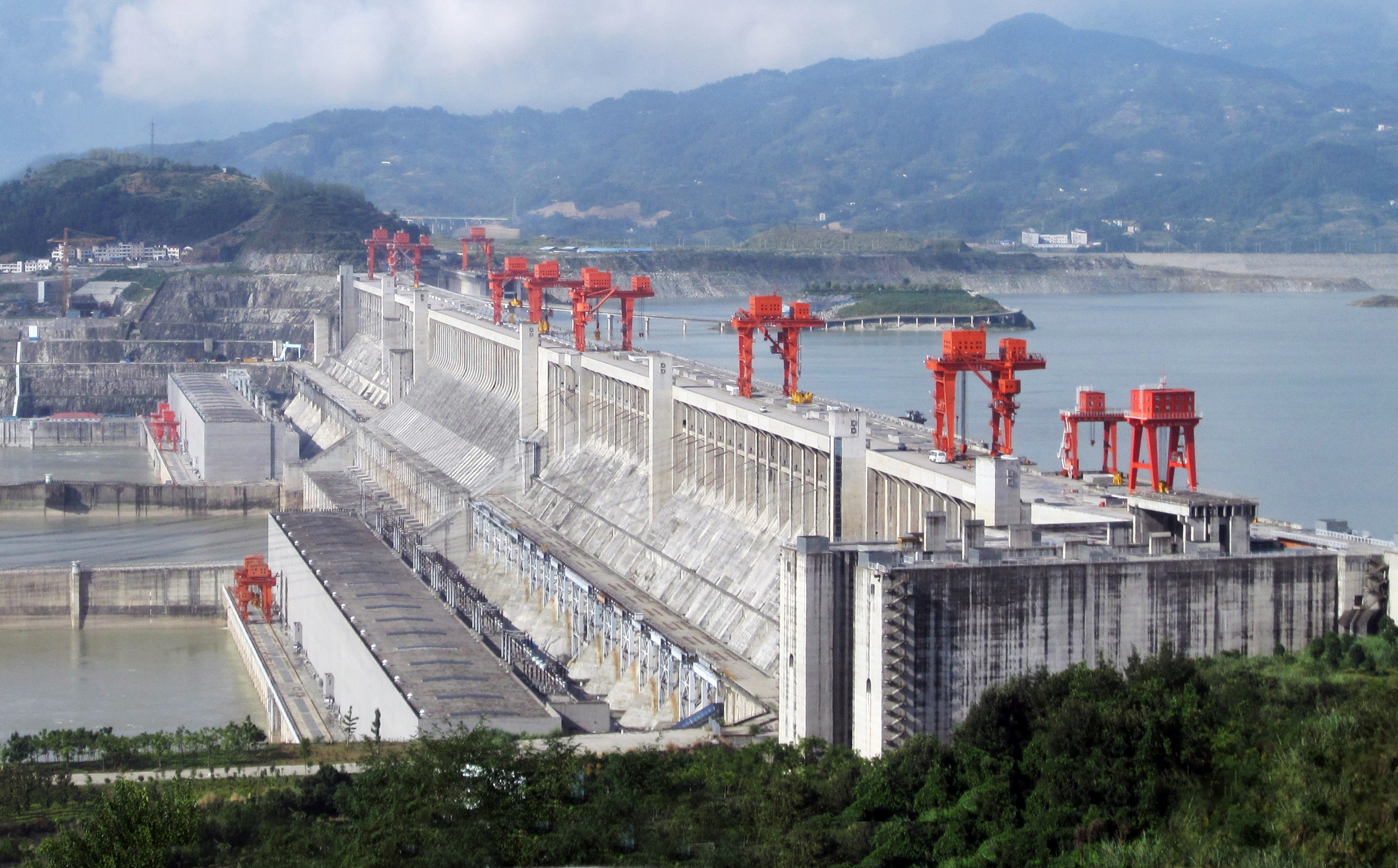
The Three Gorges Dam

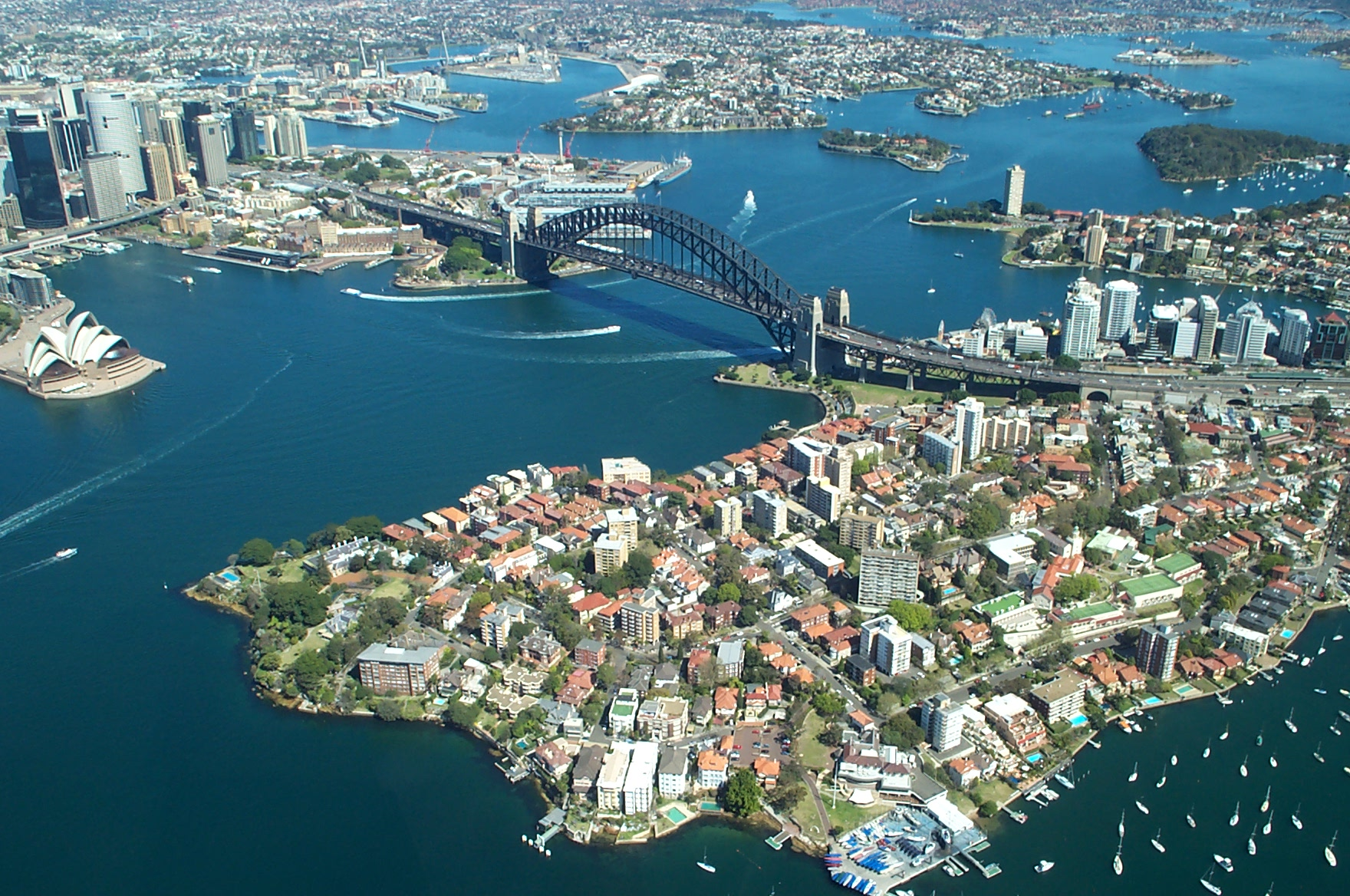
Sydney Harbour

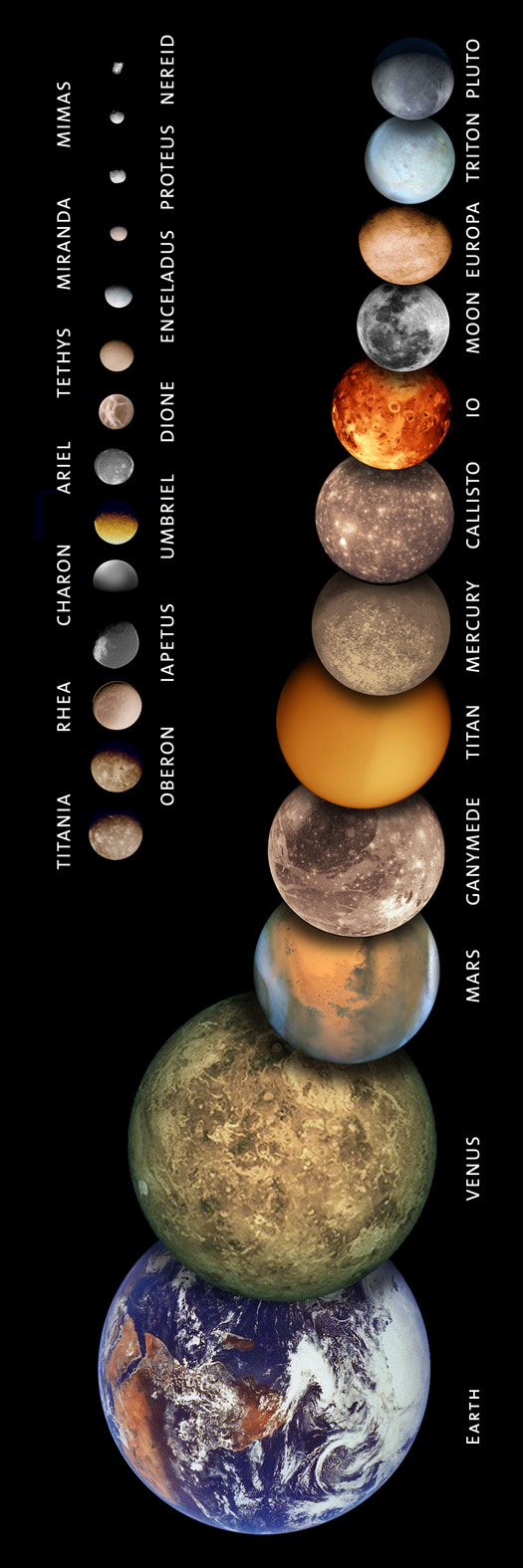
Solar System bodies with Earth volume or less

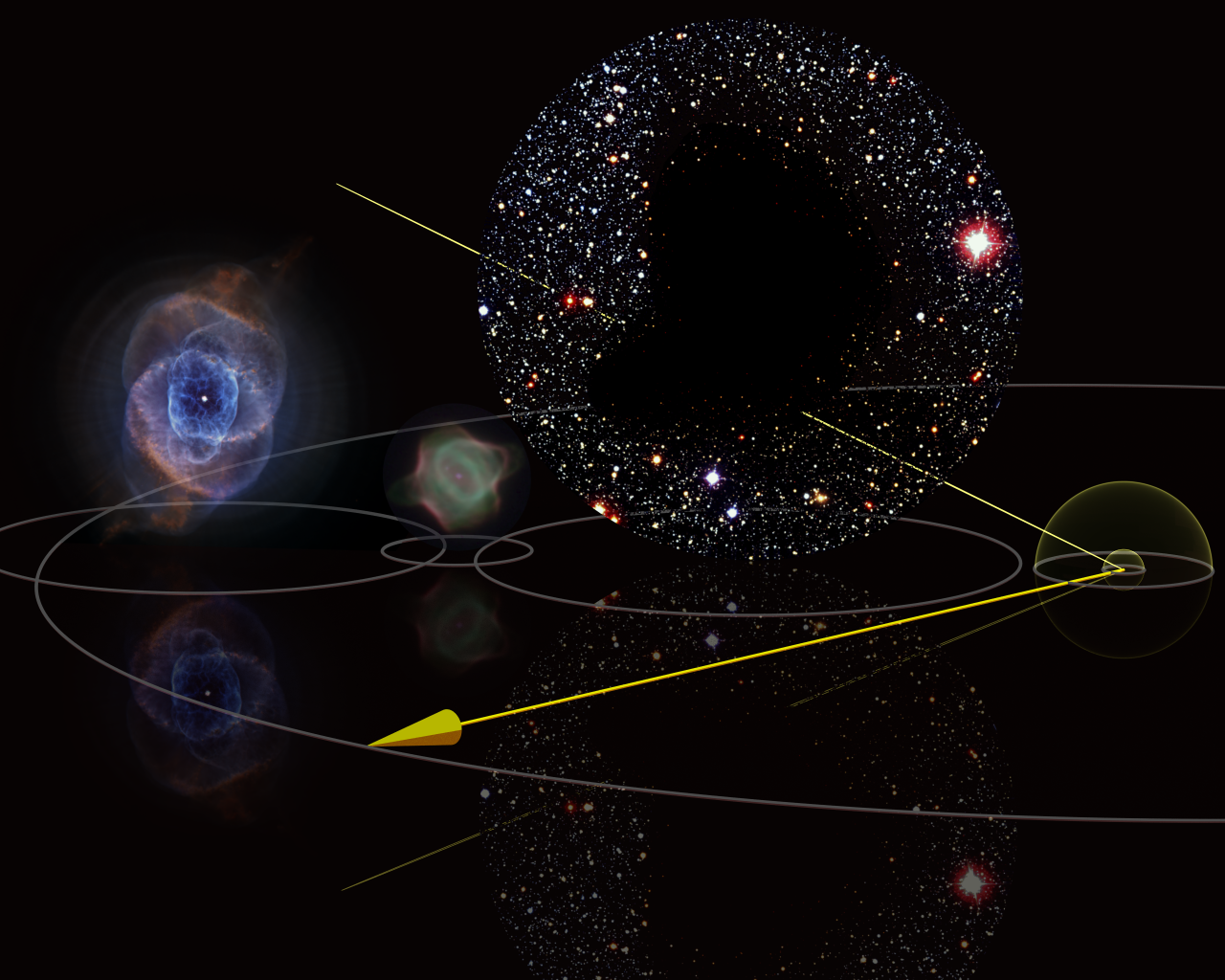
The Cat's Eye Nebula on left (about 3×10^{46} m^{3}) and the dark cloud Barnard 68 at top (about 6×10^{46} m^{3}) are of comparable volumes; the Stingray Nebula between them is smaller with a similar volume as the small yellow light-month radius sphere, about 2×10^{45} m^{3}.

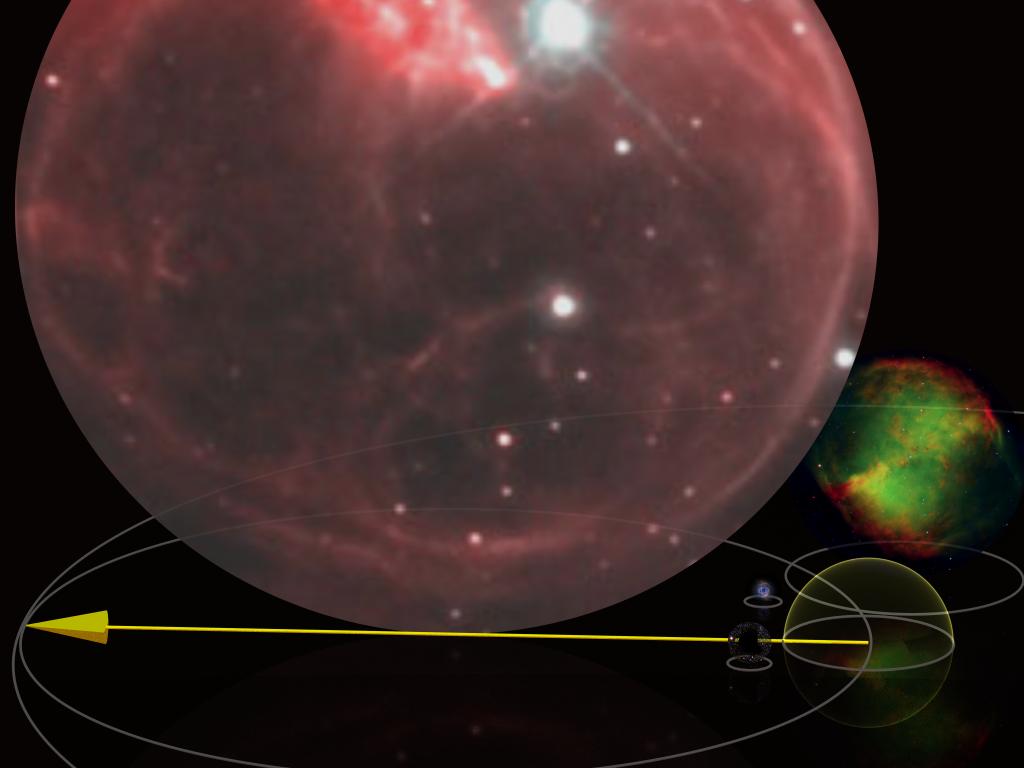
The Bubble Nebula (NGC 7635) at left with about 520 cubic light years (4.4×10^{50} m^{3}) dwarfs the Dumbbell Nebula's 12 cubic light years (1×10^{49} m^{3}) (very approximate figures)

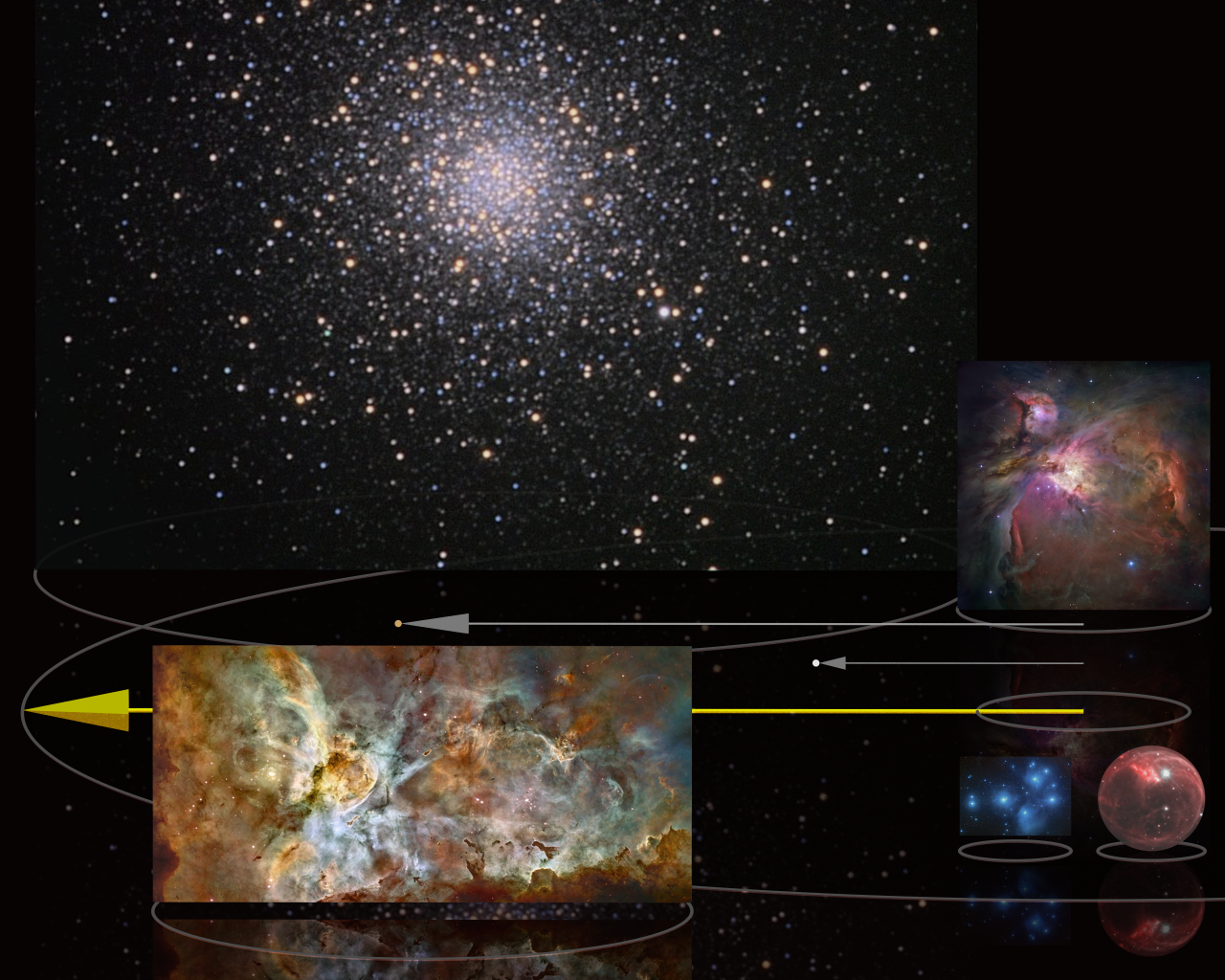
The globular cluster Messier 5 at upper left with about 2 million cubic light years (1.7×10^{54} m^{3}) dwarfs the much smaller Bubble Nebula at lower right.

== Sub-microscopic ==
Volume (m^{3})	Example
4.22419×10^{−105}	The Planck volume
1×10^{−90}	One cubic quectometre
1×10^{−81}	One cubic rontometre
1×10^{−72}	One cubic yoctometre
1×10^{−63}	One cubic zeptometre
1×10^{−54}	One cubic attometre
1×10^{−45}	One cubic femtometre
~2.82×10^{−45}	Volume of a proton
~9.4×10^{−44}	Classical volume of an electron
1×10^{−36}	One cubic picometre
1×10^{−33}	One quectolitre
1×10^{−30}	One cubic ångström or one rontolitre
7.23×10^{−30}	Volume enclosed by the Van der Waals radius of a hydrogen atom
3.936×10^{−29}	van der Waals volume of a helium atom
1.91×10^{−29}	volume enclosed by the van der Waals radius of a gold atom
3.75×10^{−29}	van der Waals volume of a H_{2} molecule
5.29×10^{−29}	van der Waals volume of a O_{2} molecule
1×10^{−27}	One cubic nanometre or one yoctolitre
1×10^{−24}	One zeptolitre
5×10^{−23}	Typical volume of structures on the Martian meteorite ALH84001
1×10^{−21}	One attolitre
4×10^{−21}	Volume of hypothesised nanobacteria
5×10^{−21}	Volume of a typical virus

== Microscopic ==
Volume (m^{3})	Example
1×10^{−18}	One cubic micrometre or one femtolitre
9×10^{−18}	Average volume of a platelet
9×10^{−17}	Normal volume of a human red blood cell
2×10^{−16}	Average volume of a lymphocyte
3.3×10^{−16}	Mean volume of a neutrophil granulocyte
4.2×10^{−16}	Volume of an average monocyte
1×10^{−15}	One picolitre
2–9×10^{−15}	One drop from a high resolution colour inkjet printer
1.3×10^{−13}	a very fine grain of sand (0.063 mm diameter, 3 micrograms)
1×10^{−12}	One nanolitre
6.2×10^{−11}	A medium grain of sand (0.5 mm diameter, 1.5 milligrams)
5×10^{−10}	Volume of a poppy seed of 1-millimetre diameter
1×10^{−9}	One cubic millimetre or one microlitre
4×10^{−9}	Volume of a mustard seed of 2-millimetre diameter
2×10^{−8}	Volume of a small grain of rice 2 mm wide by 5 mm long

== Human measures ==
Volume (m^{3})	Example
5.92×10^{−8}	One imperial minim
6.16×10^{−8}	One US minim
7×10^{−8}	Volume of a large grain of rice 3 mm wide by 12 mm long
2×10^{−7}	Average volume of a pea
1×10^{−6}	One cubic centimetre or one millilitre
1.18×10^{−6}	One imperial fluid scruple
1.23×10^{−6}	One US fluid scruple
1.80×10^{−6}	One sai
3.55×10^{−6}	One imperial fluid drachm
3.70×10^{−6}	One US fluid dram
3–5×10^{−6}	Average human ejaculation
3.55–5×10^{−6}	One teaspoon
1.14×10^{−5}	One ligula
1.42–2.0×10^{−5}	One tablespoon
1.639×10^{−5}	One cubic inch
1.80×10^{−5}	One shaku
2.84×10^{−5}	One imperial fluid ounce
2.96×10^{−5}	One US fluid ounce
3.5×10^{−5}	Average amount of blood lost by a woman during menstruation
4.5×10^{−5}	One cyathus
6.8×10^{−5}	One acetabulum
1×10^{−4}	Maximum volume of non-exempt liquids, gels, and aerosols allowed in a U.S. air traveler's carry-on luggage
1.18×10^{−4}	One US gill
1.36×10^{−4}	One quartarius
1.42×10^{−4}	One imperial gill
1.80×10^{−4}	One gō (a common size for serving sake)
2.73×10^{−4}	one Roman hemina or cotyla
3.3–3.75×10^{−4}	Volume of stubby or steinie of beer (Europe–330 mL, Canada–341 mL, Japan–350 mL, US–355 mL, Australia–375 mL)
4×10^{−4}	Rough volume of the human urinary bladder
4.73×10^{−4}	One US liquid pint
5.46×10^{−4}	One sextarius
5.51×10^{−4}	One US dry pint
5.68×10^{−4}	One imperial pint
7.5×10^{−4}	The most common volume for wine and liquor bottles, also the size of an Australian long neck of beer; sometimes called a 'fifth' in the United States for its approximation to the once-common one-fifth-gallon bottle
9.46×10^{−4}	One US liquid quart
1×10^{−3}	One cubic decimetre or one litre
1.000028×10^{−3}	Volume of 1 kilogram of distilled water (at the temperature of maximum density (3.98 °C or 39.16 °F) and standard atmospheric pressure (101.325 kPa))
1.10×10^{−3}	One US dry quart
1.14×10^{−3}	One imperial quart
1.0–8.2×10^{−3}	Typical range of automobile engine displacements
1.4×10^{−3}	Human brain cavity
1.80×10^{−3}	One shō (formerly a common sake-bottle size)
3.8×10^{−3}	One US liquid gallon
4.36×10^{−3}	One semimodius
4.40×10^{−3}	One US dry gallon
4.5×10^{−3}	One imperial gallon
5×10^{−3}	Approximate volume of the blood in one adult human
6×10^{−3}	Average total volume of the lungs of a male human
8.81×10^{−3}	One US peck
9.09×10^{−3}	One imperial peck
1.31×10^{−2}	One urna
1.80×10^{−2}	One to
1.85–3.6×10^{−2}	One Ancient Greek amphora
2.62×10^{−2}	One Roman amphora
3.4×10^{−2}	One French amphora
2.83×10^{−2}	One cubic foot
3.52×10^{−2}	One US bushel
3.64×10^{−2}	One imperial bushel
3.7–4.2×10^{−2}	One firkin
6.0×10^{−2}	Gasoline fuel tank in a car (Volvo 240)
6.8–6.9×10^{−2}	One rundlet
7.1×10^{−2}	Average volume of an adult human
7.4–8.3×10^{−2}	One kilderkin
9.55×10^{−2}	One US barrel for cranberries
1.16×10^{−1}	One US dry barrel
1.17×10^{−1}	One US beer barrel, 31 US gallons
1.19×10^{−1}	One US fluid barrel (apart from oil or beer), 31.5 US gallons
1.59×10^{−1}	One oil barrel, 42 US gallons, about one tierce (158–160 L)
1.64×10^{−1}	One imperial barrel, 36 imperial gallons
1.80×10^{−1}	One koku
2×10^{−1}	Standard drum size used for shipping bulk cargo
2.2–2.5×10^{−1}	One hogshead
3.1–3.2×10^{−1}	One puncheon or tertian
4.7–4.9×10^{−1}	One butt (an old unit for beer and wine)
5.24×10^{−1}	One culeus
7.65×10^{−1}	One cubic yard
9.5–9.8×10^{−1}	One tun (an old unit for beer and wine)
1×10^{0}	One cubic metre, one kilolitre or one stère—volume of a large domestic fridge-freezer (external dimensions)
3.85×10^{1}	External volume of a standard 20-foot ("TEU") cargo container, which has a capacity of 33.1 cubic metres
7.7×10^{1}	External volume of a standard 40-foot ("FEU") cargo container, which has a capacity of 67.5 cubic metres

== Terrestrial ==
Volume (m^{3})	Example
1.05×10^{2}	Volume of a rear-engine Leyland Titan London double-decker bus
1.49×10^{2}	Volume of any A Division New York City Subway car
1×10^{3} m^{3} (35,000 cu ft; 1.0×10^{−6} km^{3})	One cubic decametre or one megalitre
1.233×10^{3}	One acre-foot
2.5×10^{3}	Volume of an Olympic size swimming pool of minimal depth (50 m × 25 m × 2 m).
3.054×10^{3}	Volume of each of the nine spheres of the Atomium in Brussels
1.13×10^{4}	Gas volume in the first zeppelin LZ 1
1.1866×10^{4}	Amount of concrete in Trbovlje Chimney
1.56×10^{4}	Quebec's 2001 output of maple syrup
5.0×10^{4}	Typical volume of a large gasometer
8.5–9.9×10^{4}	Volume of the Royal Albert Hall auditorium
1.84×10^{5}	Volume of gas in the USS Macon (ZRS-5) zeppelin
2.11890×10^{5}	Volume of gas in the Hindenburg zeppelin
6.50×10^{5}	Volume of crude oil that can be carried aboard the Knock Nevis supertanker
9.66×10^{5}	Volume of Taipei 101's gross floor space
1×10^{6} m^{3} (1,300,000 cu yd; 0.0010 km^{3})	One cubic hectometre, one gigalitre or one kilostère
1.4×10^{6}	Volume the 1910 Lakeview Gusher oil spilt (the biggest oil gusher in US history)
1.5644×10^{6}	Volume of concrete in the Panama Canal Locks
2.6006×10^{6}	Volume of stone in the Great Pyramid of Giza
3×10^{6}	Approximately amount of mud and clay that slid into the South Nation River valley as a landslide on 20 June 1993
3.33×10^{6}	Volume of concrete in Hoover Dam
3.664883×10^{6}	Volume of the NASA's Vehicle Assembly Building
8×10^{6}	Volume of chalk excavated in the construction of the Channel Tunnel
1×10^{7}	Volume of Chagan Lake, artificial lake created by nuclear explosion
1.7×10^{7}	Volume of material in the Gatun Dam, completed in 1913
2.8×10^{7}	Volume of concrete in the Three Gorges Dam, the world's largest concrete structure
4.3×10^{7}	Volume of Aswan Dam
9×10^{7}	Volume of gas required per day by India in 2005
1.01×10^{8}	Volume of the Grimsel reservoir
1.73×10^{8}	Volume of Lake Baldegg, Switzerland
2.05×10^{8}	Volume of material excavated in the construction of the Panama Canal
2.2×10^{8}	Volume of Lac de la Gruyère, Switzerland
2.85×10^{8}	Volume of Lake Halwill, Switzerland
3.20–3.35×10^{8}	Volume of the Great Wall of China
3–5×10^{8}	Volume of all humans alive on the planet (based on an average mass of 40–70 kg per human)
4×10^{8}	Predicted volume of natural gas required per day by India in 2025
5×10^{8}	One sydharb—volume of Sydney Harbour, Australia
6.93×10^{8}	Volume of Lake Murten, Switzerland
1×10^{9} m^{3} (1.3×10^{9} cu yd; 1.0 km^{3})	One cubic kilometre or one teralitre
1.2×10^{9}	Approximate volume of rock ejected during the 1980 eruption of Mount St. Helens
1.3×10^{9}	volume of Lake Biel, Switzerland
2.5×10^{9}	volume of Lake Walen, Switzerland
3.2×10^{9}	volume of Lake Zug
3.9×10^{9}	Volume of Lake Zürich
4.168×10^{9}	One cubic mile
5×10^{9}	Volume of crude oil consumed by the world in a year
5.17×10^{9}	volume of Lake Brienz
5.2×10^{9}	Volume of the artificial Gatun Lake (Panama Canal)
6.5×10^{9}	Volume of Lake Thun
6.5×10^{9}	volume of Lake Lugano
1×10^{10}	Estimated volume of rock ejected during the 1991 eruption of Mount Pinatubo
1.4×10^{10}	volume of Lake Neuchâtel
1.45×10^{10}	Volume of Lake Lucerne
3.52×10^{10}	Volume of Lake Mead, the reservoir of the Hoover Dam
3.7×10^{10}	Volume of Lago Maggiore
5.5×10^{10}	Volume of Lake Constance
8.89×10^{10}	Volume of Lake Geneva
1×10^{11}	Estimated volume of rock exploded in eruption of Mount Tambora volcano on 12 April 1815
1.33×10^{11}	Volume of Lake Nasser
1.44×10^{11}	Volume of Fedchenko Glacier and its tributaries
2×10^{11}	Estimated volume of the annual net inflow of seawater to the Black Sea (from the Mediterranean Sea via the Bosporus)
2.8×10^{11}	Volume of Lake Onega
~3×10^{11}	Volume of crude oil on Earth
3.2×10^{11}	Estimated volume of the annual inflow of freshwater to the Black Sea
4.84×10^{11}	Volume of Lake Erie
8.37×10^{11}	Volume of Lake Ladoga
1×10^{12} m^{3} (1.3×10^{12} cu yd; 1,000 km^{3})	One petalitre
1.1×10^{12}	Volume of the Aral Sea in 1960
2.76×10^{12}	Volume of Lake Victoria
2.8×10^{12}	Volume of magma erupted by the Toba supervolcano 74000 years ago
4.918×10^{12}	Volume of Lake Michigan
5×10^{12}	Volume of the Fish Canyon Tuff erupted by the La Garita Caldera
5.5×10^{12}	Volume of the asteroid 433 Eros
1.2232×10^{13}	Volume of Lake Superior
1.84×10^{13}	Volume of Lake Tanganyika
2.36×10^{13}	Volume of Lake Baikal
5.5×10^{14}	Volume of the Black Sea
1×10^{15}	One exalitre
1×10^{15} m^{3} (1.3×10^{15} cu yd; 1,000,000 km^{3})	Volume of the Mariana Trench in the Pacific Ocean, which contains the deepest point on the Earth's surface
2.6×10^{15}	Volume of Greenland ice cap
3.7×10^{15}	Volume of the Mediterranean Sea
1.54×10^{16}	Volume of water contained in the rings of Saturn (rough estimate)
3×10^{16}	Volume of water contained in the Antarctic ice sheet (rough estimate)
3×10^{17}	Volume of the Atlantic Ocean and volume of the Indian Ocean (rough estimates)
4.5×10^{17}	Volume of Ceres
1×10^{18}	One cubic megametre or one zettalitre—volume of the Pacific Ocean (rough estimate)
1.335×10^{18}	Volume of all oceans on Earth

== Astronomical ==
Volume (m^{3})	Example
3×10^{18}	Estimated volume of Europa's oceans
6.4×10^{18}	Volume of Pluto
2.2×10^{19}	Volume of the Moon
6.1×10^{19}	Volume of planet Mercury
1.6×10^{20}	Volume of planet Mars
9.28×10^{20}	Volume of planet Venus
1×10^{21}	One yottalitre
1.08×10^{21}	Volume of planet Earth
2.25×10^{21}	Volume of all the rocky planets in the Solar System
6.38×10^{22}	Volume of planet Neptune
7.02×10^{22}	Volume of planet Uranus
9.23×10^{23}	Volume of planet Saturn
1×10^{24}	One ronnalitre
1.53×10^{24}	Volume of planet Jupiter
2.59×10^{24}	Total volume of all the planets in the Solar System
1×10^{27}	One cubic gigametre or one quettalitre
1.41×10^{27}	Volume of the Sun
~1×10^{30}	volume of Alcyone, brightest star in the Pleiades
~1.7×10^{31}	Volume of Arcturus, brightest star in Boötes
3.4×10^{32}	Volume of Rigel, the brightest star in Orion
~5×10^{32}	Volume of a red giant the same mass as the Sun
1.4×10^{33}	Volume of γ Crucis, a red giant in Crux
~1×10^{34}	Volume of Deneb, a white supergiant in Cygnus
6.4×10^{34}	Volume of η Carinae, a white supergiant in Cygnus
1.3×10^{35}	Estimated volume of S Orionis
1.5×10^{35}	Volume of Antares, a slow irregular variable in Scorpius
~2.75×10^{35}	Volume of Betelgeuse
1×10^{36}	One cubic terametre
4×10^{36}	Possible volume of μ Cephei (estimates vary)
8×10^{36}	Estimated volume of VY Canis Majoris, a red hypergiant star
3.9×10^{38}	Volume of a sphere which would enclose the orbit of Neptune
6–10×10^{39}	Possible volume of the Heliosphere inside the termination shock
1.1×10^{41}	Daily increase in volume of the Cat's Eye Nebula
4×10^{43}	Annual increase in volume of the Cat's Eye Nebula
1×10^{45}	One cubic petametre
~1.7×10^{45}	Approximate volume of the Stingray Nebula
~2.7×10^{46}	Volume of the bright inner nebula of the Cat's Eye Nebula
5.5×10^{46}	The volume of a Bok globule like Barnard 68
4.4×10^{47}	The volume of a Bok globule one light year across
8.47×10^{47}	One cubic light-year
~1.7×10^{48}	Volume of the Oort Cloud, assuming a radius of 50000 AU
~1.6×10^{49}	Volume of the Dumbbell Nebula
2.94×10^{49}	One cubic parsec
4.4×10^{50}	Approximate volume of the Bubble Nebula (NGC 7635) (assuming a radius of 5 light years, sources differ)
1×10^{54}	One cubic exametre
3×10^{55}	Estimated volume of a small dwarf galaxy like NGC 1705
3.3×10^{55}	Estimated volume of the Local Bubble, assuming a radius of 100 parsecs (~39 million cubic light years)
3×10^{58}	Estimated volume of a dwarf galaxy like the Large Magellanic Cloud
2.94×10^{58}	One cubic kiloparsec
~3.3×10^{61}	Volume of a galaxy like the Milky Way
1×10^{63}	One cubic zettametre—approximate volume of whole Milky Way including Globes
~5×10^{68}	Volume of the Local Group
6.7×10^{71}	Volume of the Gemini Void
1×10^{72}	One cubic yottametre
1.2×10^{72}	Volume of the Local Void (about 1.4×10^{24} cubic light years)
3.5×10^{72}	Volume of the Virgo Supercluster
1×10^{73}	Volume of the Sculptor Void (about 1.1×10^{25} cubic light years)
2×10^{73}	Least volume of the Southern Local Supervoid (about 2.2×10^{25} cubic light years)
3.4×10^{80}	Volume of the Observable Universe
1×10^{81}	One cubic ronnametre
7.1×10^{81}	Lower bound on the volume of the universe based on analysis of WMAP
1×10^{90}	One cubic quettametre
~1×10^{113}	rough upper bound on the physical size of the present universe, a result of the maximum number of Hubble volumes.
1×10^{182}	Estimated volume of space to contain one particle at the heat death of the universe in a flat universe.
1×10^{272}	Estimated volume of space to contain one particle at the heat death of the universe in an open universe.
