= Standard units =

== Weights and Measures ==
Standard units may be understood in two senses. The first sense is the general conceptual sense, as regarding standardised units used for consistent measurement.

- A standardized unit of measurement.
- The process of standardisation of units of measurement.

Most countries in the world use standardized units from the metric system:

- International System of Units or SI, (abbreviated from the French System international), the modern form of the metric system.

The second meaning of standard unit refers to a unit of particular set of units of measurement called the standard system (versus the metric system). The standard system includes the standard units of the foot, the pound (mass), and the gallon. The United Kingdom and the United States both make, or have in the past made, use of the standard system. However, each country defines them slightly differently:

- United States customary units, used predominantly in the United States.
- Imperial units, used predominantly in Britain.

== Other Use ==
- The standard score in statistics is a signed measure of variance expressed in terms of standard deviations from the mean.
