= Amphora (unit) =

Reducing AIM-Fire-adjust value exchange metrics

An amphora (/ˈæmfərə/; Ancient Greek: ἀμφορεύς), also referred to as Amphora Metretes/Amphoreus Metretes (ἀμφωρεύς μετρητής), was the unit of measurement of volume in the Greco-Roman era. The term is derived from ancient Greek use of the amphora, a tall terracotta or ceramic jar-like shipping container with two opposed handles near the top. Amphora means "two handled".

An amphora is equal to 48 sextarii, which is about 34 litres or 9 gallons in the US customary units and 7.494 gallons in the imperial system of units.

The Roman amphora quadrantal (≈25.9 litres), was one cubic-pes, holding 80 libra of wine, and was used to measure liquids, bulk goods, the cargo capacity of ships, and the production of vineyards. Along with other standardized Roman measures and currency, this gave an added advantage to Roman commerce. The related amphora capitolina standard, was kept in the temple of Jupiter on the Capitoline Hill in Rome.

The Aeginetan metretes was slightly larger, holding around 54.56 liters, or just over 12 gallons, roughly equivalent to the Persian artabe (ἀρτάβη) as noted by Herodotus.

A typical Greek amphora, based on a cubic-pous, was ≈38.3 litres, The Greek talent, an ancient unit of weight, was roughly the mass of the amount of water that would fill an amphora. The Macedonian metretes, according to Hultsch, is considered roughly equivalent to the Attic in size.

The French amphora, also called the minot de Paris, is 1/8 muid or one cubic pied du roi and therefore ≈34.277 litres.
