= Cubic inch =

Unit of volume

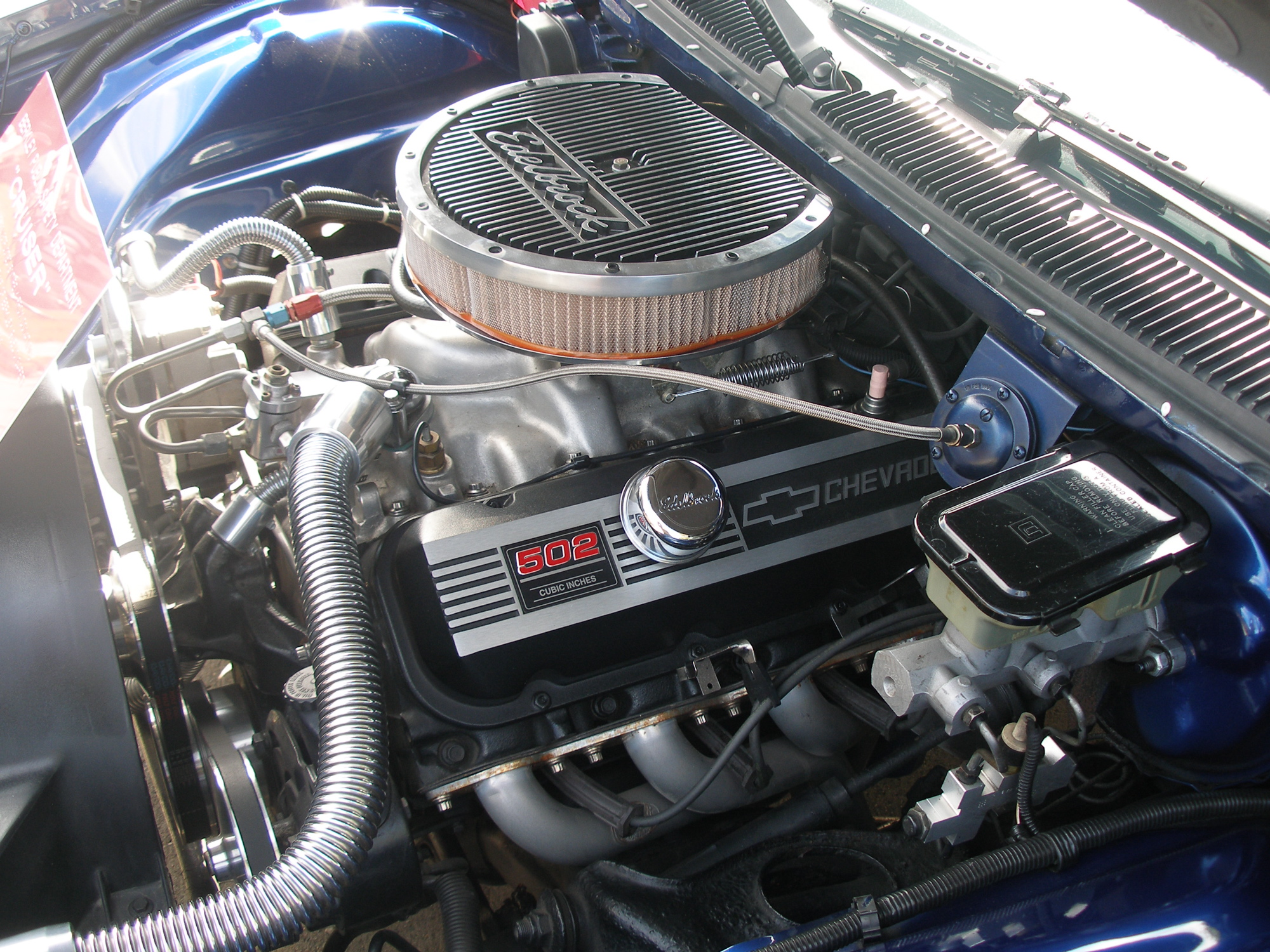
- An engine with a swept piston displacement of 502 cubic inches

General information
- Unit system: Nonstandard
- Unit of: volume
- Symbol: in^{3}, cu in

Conversions
1 in^{3} in ...	... is equal to ...
- SI derived units: 16.387064 mL
- US customary: 1/231 US gallon
- nonstandard: 1/1728 ft^{3}

The cubic inch (symbol in^{3}), sometimes abbreviated cu in, is a unit of volume in the Imperial units and United States customary units systems. It is the volume of a cube with each of its three dimensions (length, width, and height) being one inch long which is equivalent to 1/231 of a US gallon.

The cubic inch and the cubic foot are used as units of volume in the United States, although the common SI units of volume, the liter, milliliter, and cubic meter, are also used, especially in manufacturing and high technology. One cubic inch is exactly 16.387064 mL.

One cubic foot is equal to exactly 1,728 cubic inches (28.316846592 L), as 12^{3} = 1728.

== Notation conventions ==
- The following abbreviations have been used to denote the cubic inch: cubic in, cu inch, cu in, cui, cu. in.
- The IEEE standard symbol is: in^{3}
- In internal combustion engines, the following abbreviations are used to denote cubic inch displacement: c.i.d., cid, CID, c.i., ci
- The National Electrical Code established the cubic inch as the conventional unit in North America for measuring the usable volume of electrical boxes. A "cu in" rating is embossed on each box.

== Equivalence with other units of volume ==
One cubic inch is equal to:

- Exactly 1/1728 cubic feet
- Exactly 1/231 US gallon
- Exactly 4/231 US liquid quart
- Exactly 8/231 US liquid pint
- Exactly 32/231 US gill
- Exactly 128/231 US fluid ounce
- Exactly 1 25/231 US tablespoons
- Exactly 3 25/77 US teaspoons
- Exactly 4 100/231 US fluid drams
- Exactly 50/107521 US bushel
- Exactly 1600/107521 US dry quart
- Exactly 3200/107521 US dry pint
- ≈0.00360465 imperial gallons
- ≈0.0144186 imperial quarts
- ≈0.0288372 imperial pints
- ≈0.1153488 imperial gills
- ≈0.576744 imperial fluid ounces
- ≈1.153488 imperial tablespoons
- ≈4.613952 imperial fluid drams
- ≈0.00045058 imperial bushels
- Exactly 1/9702 barrel of crude oil
- Exactly 16.387064 milliliters (cubic centimeters)

== See also ==
- Conversion of units
- Orders of magnitude (volume)
- Square inch
