= Minot (unit) =

The minot (French pronunciation: [mino]) is an old unit of dry volume, used in France prior to metrication. The unit was equivalent to three French bushels (boisseaux), half a mine, and one quarter of a setier. The size of the minot is comparable to the US and Imperial bushels.

The name minot derives from the larger unit, the mine, with an -ot diminutive suffixed. The term mine in this case derives from the same Greek origin as the word hemisphere, and refers to half of the larger setier. The volumetric mine should not be confused with the mass unit mina, which is also called a mine in French.

As the French bushel was defined as 10/27 of a cubic French royal foot, or 640 cubic French royal inches, the minot was 1920 cubic French royal inches, corresponding to about 38.086 litres.

In Toulouse the minot was used for charcoal and salt measurement. Later on, there was also a minot de Paris based on exactly one cubic French royal foot, which is equivalent to 34.277 litres. The ancient Roman amphora shared a similar definition (one cubic Roman foot). It was itself divided into three units, similar to the minot.

== See also ==
- Units of measurement in France
- Ancient Roman units of measurement
