= Cubic metre =

SI derived unit of volume

cubic metre
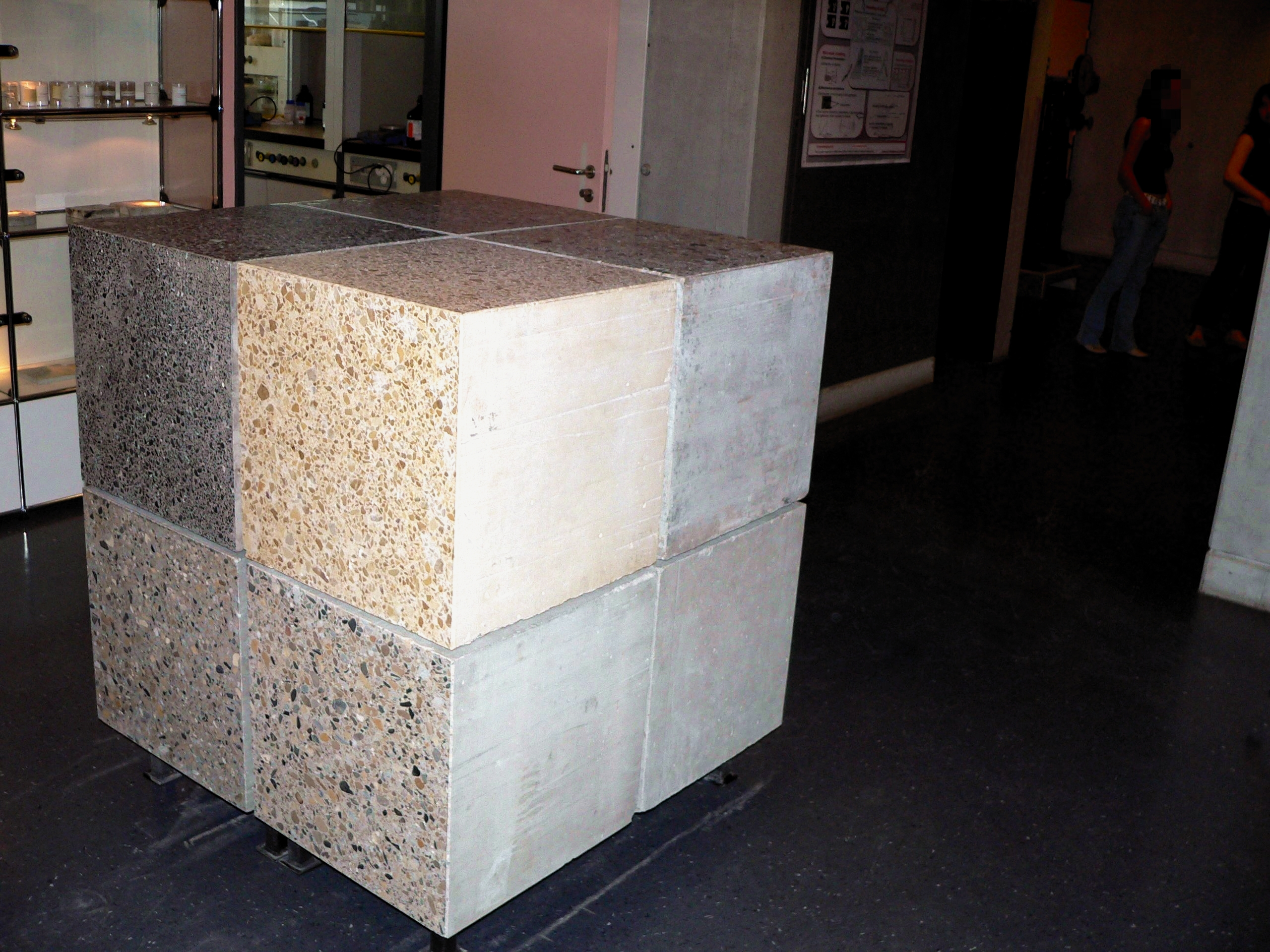
- All eight cubes together form one cubic metre of concrete (representing the world annual production per capita) (on the left).

General information
- Unit system: SI
- Unit of: volume
- Symbol: m^{3}

The cubic metre (in Commonwealth English and international spelling as used by the International Bureau of Weights and Measures) or cubic meter (in American English) is the unit of volume in the International System of Units (SI). Its symbol is m^{3}. It is the volume of a cube with edges one metre in length. An alternative name, which allowed a different usage with metric prefixes, was the stère, still sometimes used for dry measure (for instance, in reference to wood). Another alternative name, no longer widely used, was the kilolitre. The acronym CBM is in common use to describe a cubic metre.

== Conversions ==
Some SI units of volume to scale and approximate corresponding mass of water

1 cubic metre	= 1000 litres (exactly)
1 cubic metre	≈ 35.3146667 cubic feet
1 cubic metre	≈ 1.3079506 cubic yards
1 cubic metre	≈ 6.2898108 oil barrels
1 cubic metre	≈ 219.96925 imperial gallons
1 cubic metre	≈ 264.17205 US fluid gallons

A cubic metre of pure water at the temperature of maximum density (3.983 °C) and standard atmospheric pressure (101.325 kPa) has a mass of 1000 kg, or one tonne, which makes its maximum density at 101.325 kPa 1 Mg/m^{3}. At 0 °C, the freezing point of water, a cubic metre of water has slightly less mass, 999.85 kilograms.

The "cubic metre" symbol is encoded by Unicode at code point U+33A5 ㎥ SQUARE M CUBED.

== Multiples and submultiples ==
=== Multiples ===
Cubic decametre
the volume of a cube of side length one decametre (10 m)
equal to a megalitre
1 dam^{3} = 1000 m^{3} = 1 ML

Cubic hectometre
the volume of a cube of side length one hectometre (100 m)
equal to a gigalitre
in civil engineering abbreviated MCM for million cubic metres
1 hm^{3} = 1000000 m^{3} = 1 GL

Cubic kilometre
the volume of a cube of side length one kilometre (1000 m)
equal to a teralitre
1 km^{3} = 1000000000 m^{3} = 1 TL (810713.19 acre-feet; 0.239913 cubic miles)

=== Submultiples ===
Cubic decimetre
the volume of a cube of side length one decimetre (0.1 m)
equal to a litre
1 dm^{3} = 0.001 m^{3} = 1 L
(also known as DCM (=Deci Cubic Meter) in Rubber compound processing)

Cubic centimetre
the volume of a cube of side length one centimetre (0.01 m)
equal to a millilitre
1 cm^{3} = 0.000001 m^{3} = 10^{−6} m^{3} = 1 mL

Cubic millimetre
the volume of a cube of side length one millimetre (0.001 m)
equal to a microlitre
1 mm^{3} = 0.000000001 m^{3} = 10^{−9} m^{3} = 1 μL

== See also ==
- Orders of magnitude (volume)
- Reciprocal cubic metre
- Standard cubic foot
