= Cubic foot =

Imperial and US customary (non-metric) unit of volume

cubic foot
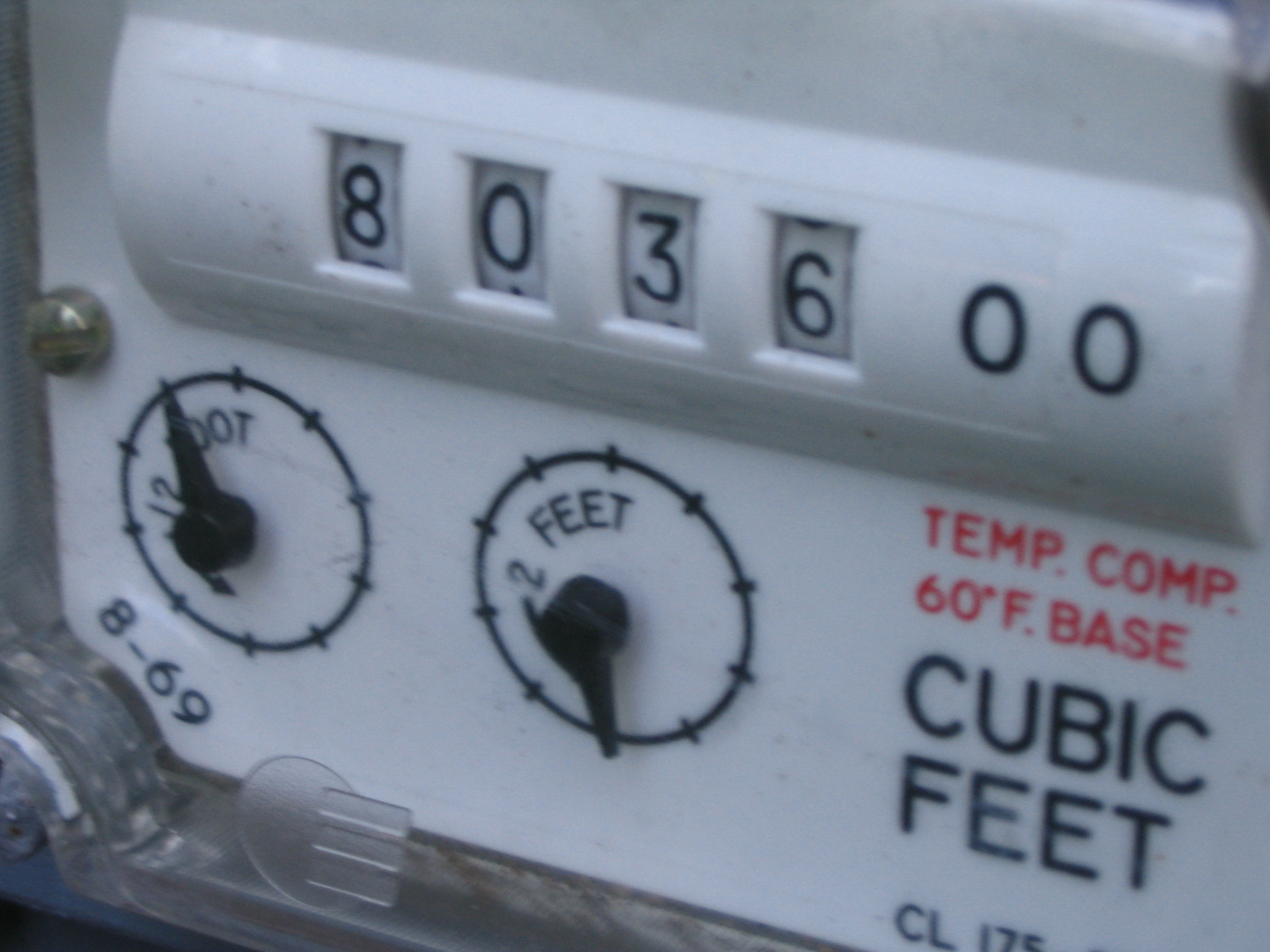
- Gas meter with volume measured in cubic feet

General information
- Unit system: Imperial and US Customary
- Unit of: Volume
- Symbol: ft^{3}, cu ft

Conversions
1 ft^{3} in ...	... is equal to ...
- US Customary: 1728 in^{3} 1/27 yd^{3}
- SI units: 0.028316846592 m^{3}

The cubic foot (symbol ft^{3} or cu ft) is an imperial and US customary (non-metric) unit of volume, used in the United States and the United Kingdom. It is defined as the volume of a cube with sides of one foot (0.3048 m) in length, or exactly 28.316846592 L (which differs by about 1% from 1/35 of a cubic metre, making that a suitable approximation in many cases).

== Conversions ==
1 cubic foot	≡ 1728 cubic inches
1 cubic foot	≡ 1/27 of a cubic yard
1 cubic foot	≡ 28.316846592 L
1 cubic foot	≡ 7 37/77 US gallons
1 cubic foot	≡ 957 39/77 US fluid ounces
1 cubic foot	≈ 6.228835 imperial gallons
1 cubic foot	≈ 996.6137 imperial fluid ounces
1 cubic foot	≡ 86400/107521 US bushels
1 cubic foot	≈ 0.7786044 imperial bushels
1 cubic foot	≡ 96/539 oil barrel

== Symbols and abbreviations ==
The IEEE symbol for the cubic foot is ft^{3}. The following abbreviations are used: cubic feet, cubic foot, cubic ft, cu feet, cu foot, cu ft, cu.ft, cuft, cb ft, cb.ft, cbft, cbf, feet^{3}, foot^{3}, ft^{3}, feet/-3, foot/-3, ft/-3.

Larger multiples are in common usage in commerce and industry in the United States:

- CCF or HCF: Centum (Latin hundred) cubic feet; i.e., 100 ft^{3} (2.8 m^{3})
  - Used in the billing of natural gas and water supply delivered to households.
- MCF: Mille (Latin thousand) cubic feet; i.e., 1,000 ft^{3} (28.3 m^{3})
- MMCF: Mille mille (= million) cubic feet; i.e., 1,000,000 ft^{3} (28,320 m^{3})
- MMCFD: MMCF per day; i.e., 1,000,000 cu ft/d (28,000 m^{3}/d)
  - Used in the oil and gas industry.
- BCF or TMC: Billion or thousand million cubic feet; i.e., 1,000,000,000 ft^{3} (28,320,000 m^{3})
  - TMC is usually used for referring to storage capacity and actual storage volume of storage dams.
- TCF: Trillion cubic feet; i.e., 1,000,000,000,000 ft^{3} (2.8×10^{10} m^{3})
  - Used in the oil and gas industry.

== Cubic foot per second and related flow rates ==
The IEEE symbol for the cubic foot per second is ft^{3}/s. The following other abbreviations are also sometimes used:

- ft^{3}/sec
- cu ft/s
- cfs or CFS
- cusec
- second-feet

The flow or discharge of rivers, i.e., the volume of water passing a location per unit of time, is commonly expressed in units of cubic feet per second or cubic metres per second.

Cusec is a unit of flow rate, used mostly in the United States in the context of water flow, particularly of rivers and canals.

Conversions: 1 ft^{3}/s = 0.0283168 m^{3}/s = 28.3168 L/s = 1.699011 m^{3}/min = 1,699.011 L/min

=== Cubic foot per minute ===
The IEEE symbol for the cubic foot per minute is ft^{3}/min. The following abbreviations are used:

- cu ft/min
- cufm
- cfm or CFM
- cfpm or CFPM

Cubic feet per minute is used to measure the amount of air that is being delivered, and is a common metric used for carburetors, pneumatic tools, and air-compressor systems.

== Standard cubic foot ==
A standard cubic foot (abbreviated scf) is a measure of quantity of gas, sometimes defined in terms of standard temperature and pressure as a cubic foot of volume at 60 °F (16 °C; 289 K) and 14.7 pounds per square inch (1.01 bar; 101 kPa) of pressure.

== See also ==
- Board foot
- Conversion of units
- Cord (unit)
- Cube (arithmetic), cube root
- Cubic inch
- Cubic yard
- Orders of magnitude (volume) for a comparison with other volumes
  - Orders of magnitude (one cubic millimetre to one cubic metre)
- Square foot
- Therm, a unit of natural gas approximately equal to 100 cubic feet
- Cubic metre per second
