= Cubic yard =

Imperial unit of volume

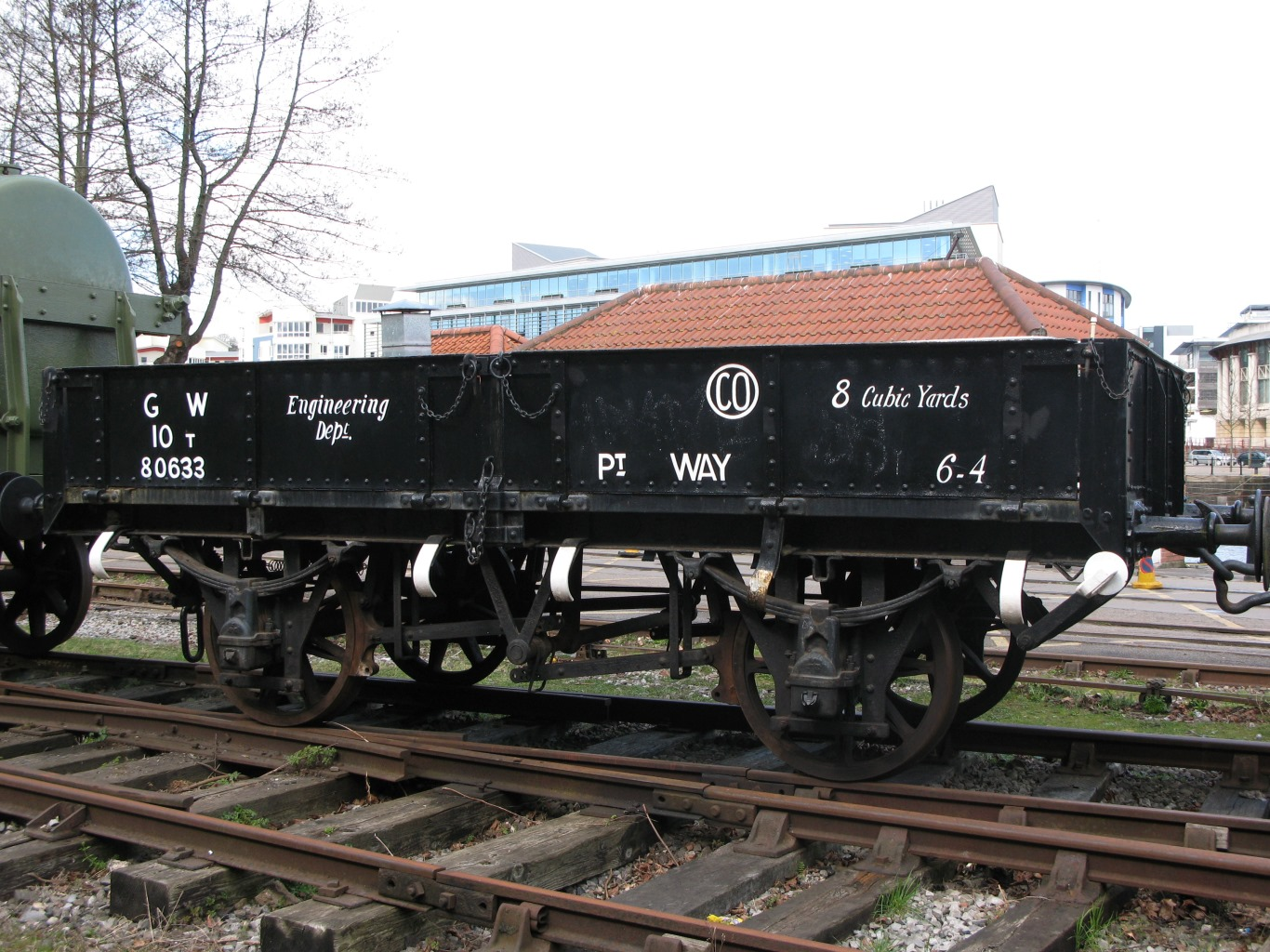
- A GRW ballast wagon with a volume of 8 cubic yards

General information
- Unit system: Imperial and US customary
- Unit of: Volume
- Symbol: yd^{3}, cu yd

Conversions
1 yd^{3} in ...	... is equal to ...
- SI units: 0.764554857984 m^{3}
- Imperial and US customary: 27 ft^{3}

A cubic yard (symbol yd^{3}) is an imperial / U.S. customary (non-SI non-metric) unit of volume used in Canada and the United States. It is defined as the volume of a cube with sides of 1 yard (3 feet, 36 inches, 0.9144 meters) in length.

== Symbols and abbreviations ==
The IEEE symbol for the cubic yard is yd^{3}. A non-standard abbreviation is cu yd.

=== Cubic yard per second ===
One cubic yard per second (1 yd^{3}/s) is a unit of volume flow rate. It corresponds to one cubic yard passing through a specified area every second.

=== Cubic yard per minute ===
One cubic yard per minute (1 yd^{3}/min) is a unit of volume flow rate. It corresponds to one cubic yard passing through a specified area every minute.

- 1 yd^{3}/s = 60 yd^{3}/min

== Conversions ==
1 cubic yard
≡ 27 cubic feet
≡ 46656 cubic inches
≡ 764.554857984 litres
≈ 21.0223197 imperial bushels
≡ 21 74859/107521 US bushels
≈ 168.1785574 imperial gallons
≡ 201 75/77 US gallons
≡ 4 436/539 oil barrels

== See also ==
- cubic foot
- cubic inch
- Square yard
- Orders of magnitude (volume)
- Conversion of units
- Cube (arithmetic), cube root
  - Cubic equation, cubic function
