= United States customary units =

Units of measurement commonly used in the U.S.

Countries using the metric (SI), imperial, and US customary systems as of 2019

United States customary units form a system of measurement units commonly used in the United States and most U.S. territories since being standardized and adopted in 1832. The United States customary system developed from English units that were in use in the British Empire before the U.S. became an independent country. The United Kingdom's system of measures evolved by 1824 to create the imperial system, with imperial units, which was officially adopted in 1826, changing the definitions of some of its units. Consequently, while many U.S. units are essentially similar to their imperial counterparts, there are noticeable differences between the systems.

The majority of U.S. customary units were redefined in terms of the meter and kilogram with the Mendenhall Order of 1893 and, in practice, for many years before. These definitions were refined by the international yard and pound agreement of 1959.

The United States uses customary units in commercial activities, as well as for personal and social use. In science, medicine, many sectors of industry, and some government and military areas, metric units are used. The International System of Units (SI), the modern form of the metric system, is preferred for many uses by the U.S. National Institute of Standards and Technology (NIST). For newer types of measurement where there is no traditional customary unit, international units are used, sometimes mixed with customary units: for example, electrical resistivity of wire expressed in ohms (SI) per thousand feet.

== History ==
The United States customary system of units of 1832 is based on the system in use in the United Kingdom prior to the introduction to the British imperial system on January 1, 1826. Both systems are derived from English units, an older system of units which had evolved over the millennia before American independence, and which had its roots in both Roman and Anglo-Saxon units.

The customary system was championed by the U.S.-based International Institute for Preserving and Perfecting Weights and Measures in the late 19th century. Some advocates of the customary system saw the French Revolutionary, or metric, system as atheistic. The president of an Ohio auxiliary of the Institute wrote that the traditional units were "a just weight and a just measure, which alone are acceptable to the Lord". His organization later went so far as to publish music for a song proclaiming "down with every 'metric' scheme".

The U.S. government passed the Metric Conversion Act of 1975, which made the metric system "the preferred system of weights and measures for U.S. trade and commerce". The legislation states that the federal government has a responsibility to assist industry as it voluntarily converts to the metric system, i.e., metrification. This is most evident in U.S. labeling requirements on food products, where SI units are almost always presented alongside customary units. According to the CIA World Factbook, the United States is one of three nations (along with Liberia and Myanmar (Burma)) that have not adopted the metric system as their official system of weights and measures.

Executive Order 12770, signed by President George H. W. Bush in July 1991, citing the Metric Conversion Act, directed departments and agencies within the executive branch of the United States Government to "take all appropriate measures within their authority" to use the metric system "as the preferred system of weights and measures for United States trade and commerce" and authorized the Secretary of Commerce "to charter an Interagency Council on Metric Policy ('ICMP'), which will assist the Secretary in coordinating Federal Government-wide implementation of this order". Implementation of metrication in the United States has been limited.

U.S. customary units are widely used on consumer products and in industrial manufacturing. Metric units are standard in the fields of science, medicine, and engineering, as well as many sectors of industry and government, including the military. There are anecdotal objections to the use of metric units in carpentry and the building trades, on the basis that it is easier to remember an integer number of inches plus a fraction, rather than a measurement in millimeters, or that foot-inch measurements are more suitable when distances are frequently divided into halves, thirds, and quarters, often in parallel. The argument has also been made that the metric system lacks a colloquial equivalent to the foot.

The term "United States customary units" was used by the former United States National Bureau of Standards, although "English units" is sometimes used in colloquial speech.

== Length ==
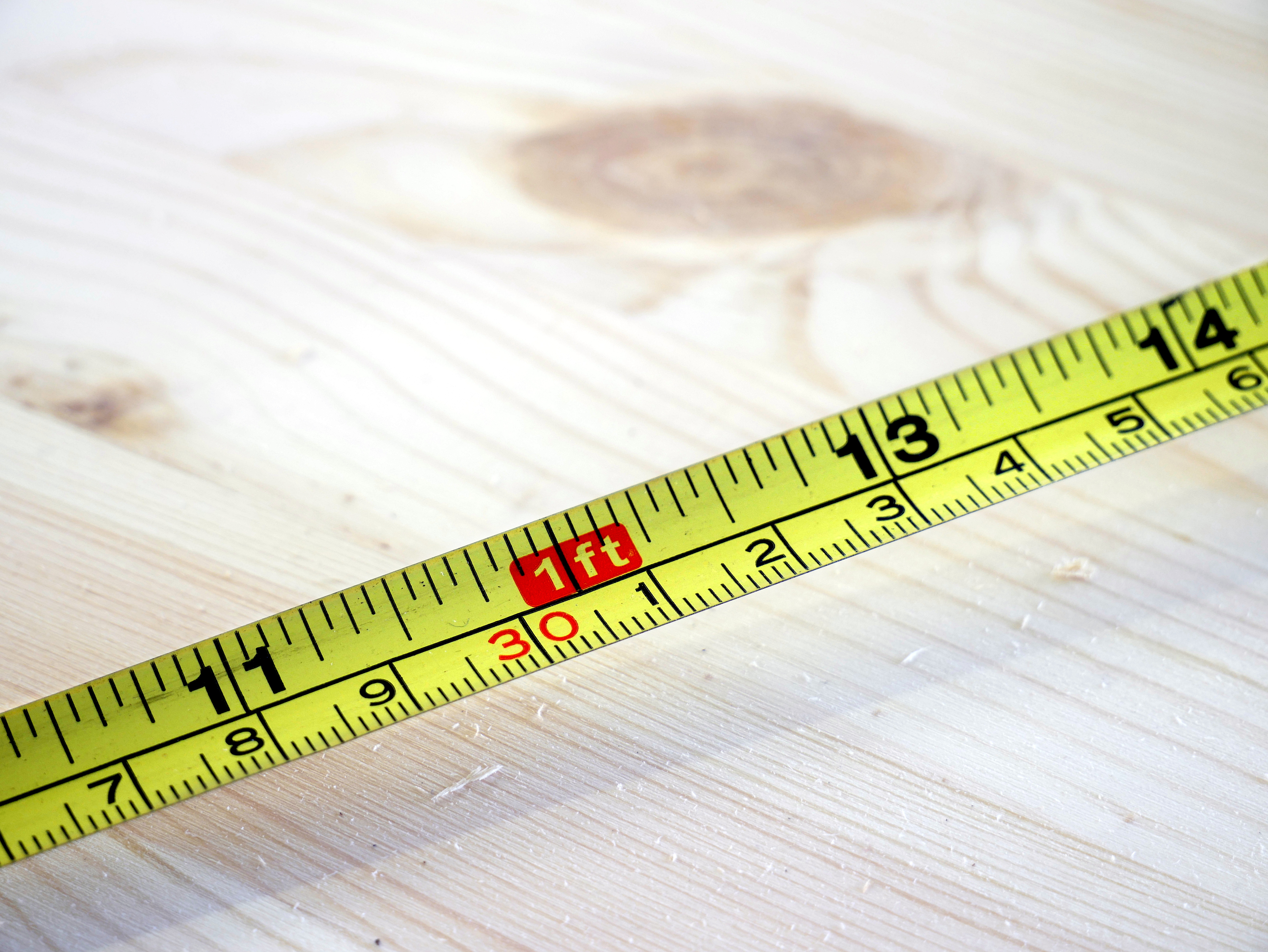
A tape measure with markings in inches, feet and centimeters

For measuring length, the U.S. customary system uses the inch, foot, yard, and mile, which are the only four customary length measurements in everyday use. From 1893, the foot was legally defined as exactly 1200/3937 m, approximately 0.3048006 m. Since July 1, 1959, the units of length have been defined on the basis of 1 yd = 0.9144 m, which makes the foot exactly 0.3048 m.

The U.S., the United Kingdom and other Commonwealth countries agreed on this definition per the International Yard and Pound Agreement of 1958. At the time of the agreement, the basic geodetic datum in North America was the North American Datum of 1927 (NAD27), which had been constructed by triangulation based on the definition of the foot in the Mendenhall Order of 1893, that is 1 ft = 1200/3937 m: this definition was retained for data derived from NAD27, but renamed the US survey foot to distinguish it from the international foot.

For most applications, the difference between the two definitions is insignificant – one international foot is exactly 0.999998 of a US survey foot, for a difference of about 1/8 in (3 mm) per mile – but it affects the definition of the State Plane Coordinate Systems (SPCSs), which can stretch over hundreds of miles.

The NAD27 was replaced in the 1980s by the North American Datum of 1983 (NAD83), which is defined in meters. The SPCSs were also updated, but the U.S. National Geodetic Survey left the decision of which, if any, definition of the foot to use to the individual states and other jurisdictions. All SPCS 1983 systems are defined in meters, but forty jurisdictions also use the survey foot, six use the international foot, and ten do not specify which, if any, foot type should be used.

In 2019, the NIST, working with the National Geodetic Survey (NGS), National Ocean Service (NOS), National Oceanic and Atmospheric Administration (NOAA) and Department of Commerce (DOC), issued a Federal Register Notice (FRN) indicating the deprecation of the U.S. survey foot and U.S. survey mile units from December 31, 2022.

In the following tables in this and subsequent sections, the most common measures are shown in italics, and approximate values are shown in parentheses; values not in parentheses are exact.

=== International units ===
List of international units
Unit	Name	Divisions	SI equivalent
1 twip	twip	1/20 p; 1/1440 in	127/7200 mm (17.638̅ μm)
1 mil	thousandth of an inch; mil	1/1000 in	25.4 μm
1 p	point	1/72 in	127/360 mm (352.7̅ μm)
1 P	pica	12 p	127/30 mm (4.23̅ mm)
1 in; 1 ″	inch	6 P	25.4 mm
1 ft; 1 ′	foot	12 in	0.3048 m
1 yd	yard	3 ft	0.9144 m
1 mi	mile	5280 ft; 1760 yd	1.609344 km
1 le	league	3 mi; 15840 ft	4.828032 km

=== International nautical units ===
List of international nautical units
Unit	Name	Divisions	SI equivalent
1 ftm	fathom	2 yd; 6 ft	1143/625 m; 1.8288 m
1 cb	cable	120 ftm; 1.091 fur	3429/15625 km; 0.219456 km
1 nmi; 1 NM	nautical mile	1.151 mi; 8.439 cb	1852 m; 1.852 km

=== US survey units ===
Note that as announced by the National Institute of Standards and Technology, the US survey foot, and other units defined in terms of it, have been deprecated since 2023, "except for historic and legacy applications".

List of US Survey units
Unit	Name	Divisions	SI equivalent	
Unit	Name	Divisions	Before 2023	From 2023
1 li	link	33/50 ft 7.92 in	792/3937 m (0.20117 m)	0.201168 m
1 ft	US survey foot (deprecated since 2023)	—N/a	1200/3937 m (0.3048006 m)	—N/a
1 rd	rod; "pole"; "perch"	25 li 16.5 ft	19,800/3937 m (5.029 m)	5.0292 m
1 ch	chain	4 rd 66 ft	79,200/3937 m 20.117 m	20.1168 m
1 fur	furlong	10 ch	792/3937 km (201.168 m)	201.168 m
1 mi	U.S. survey mile	8 fur	6336/3937 km (1.609347 km)	1.609344 km
1 lea	league	3 mi	19,008/3937 km (4.828 km)	4.828032 km

== Area ==
List of US units of area
Unit	Name	Divisions	SI equivalent	
Unit	Name	Divisions	Before 2023	From 2023
1 sq ft; 1 ft^{2}	square foot	144 sq in (international)	0.09290304 m^{2}	0.09290304 m^{2}
1 sq yd; 1 yd^{2}	square yard	9 ft^{2}	0.83612736 m^{2}	0.83612736 m^{2}
1 sq ch; 1 ch^{2}	square chain	4,356 sq ft (survey); 16 sq rod	(404.6873 m^{2})	404.68564224 m^{2}
1 acre	acre	43,560 sq ft (survey); 10 sq ch	(4,046.873 m^{2})	4,046.8564224 m^{2}
1 section	section	640 acres; 1 sq mi (survey)	(2.589998 km^{2})	—N/a
1 twp	survey township	36 section; 4 sq lea	(93.23993 km^{2})	—N/a

The most widely used area unit with a name unrelated to any length unit is the acre. The National Institute of Standards and Technology formerly contended that customary area units are defined in terms of the square survey foot, not the square international foot. From 2023, it states that "although historically defined using the U.S. survey foot, the statute mile can be defined using either definition of the foot, as is the case for all other units listed in this table. However, use of definitions based on the U.S. survey foot should be avoided after December 31, 2022 except for historic and legacy applications."

== Volume ==
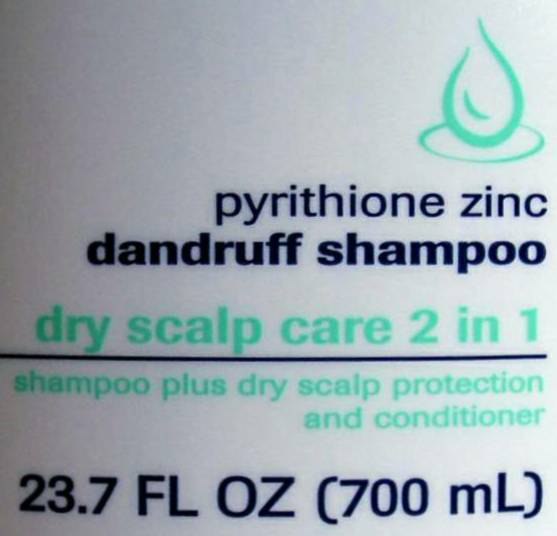
A 23.7 US fl oz (700 mL) bottle displaying both U.S. and metric units

List of US units of volume
Unit	Name	Divisions	SI equivalent
1 cu in; 1 in^{3}	cubic inch	—N/a	16.387064 mL
1 cu ft; 1 ft^{3}	cubic foot	1,728 cu in	28.316846592 L
1 cu yd; 1 yd^{3}	cubic yard	27 cu ft	764.554857984 L; 0.764554857984 m^{3}
1 acre⋅ft	acre-foot	43,560 cu ft; (1,613.333 cu yd)	1.23348183754752 ML; (1,233.482 m^{3})

The cubic inch, cubic foot and cubic yard are commonly used for measuring volume. There is one group of units for measuring volumes of liquids, based on the wine gallon and subdivisions of the fluid ounce, and one for measuring volumes of dry material, each with their own names and sub-units.

The units and their names are similar to the units in the imperial system, and many units are shared between the two systems as a whole. With respect to volume, this differs. The independence of the U.S. from the British Empire decades prior to the reformation of units in 1824—most notably the gallon, its subdivisions, and (in mass) higher combinations above the pound—is the cause of the differences in values.

As a non-participant in that reform, the U.S. retained the separate systems for measuring the volumes of liquids and dry material, whereas the imperial system had unified the units for both under a new imperial gallon. The U.S. uses the pre-1824 gallon (231 cubic inches, 3,790 cm^{3}) and Winchester bushel (2,150.42 cubic inches, 35,239.1 cm^{3}), as opposed to British 1824 definition of 1 imperial gallon (4.5 L; 1.2 US gal) = 10 lb (4.5 kg) of water and the bushel as 8 imperial gallons (36 L; 9.6 US gal).

=== Fluid volume ===
List of US units of volume for liquids
Unit	Name	Divisions	Metric equivalent
1 drop	drop		51.3429 μL
1 min	minim	1.2 drops	61.6115 μL
1 gr H_{2}O	grain water	1.1 US min	64.7989 μL
1 fl dr	US fluid dram	60 min; 72 drops	3.6967 mL
1 tsp	teaspoon	80 min	4.9289 mL
1 tbsp	tablespoon	3 tsp; 4 fl dr	14.787 mL
1 fl oz; 1 US fl oz	US fluid ounce	2 tbsp; (1.0408 imp fl oz of water)	29.574 mL
1 jig	US shot	1.5 US fl oz; 3 tbsp	44.360 mL
1 gi	US gill	2 2/3 jig; 4 US fl oz	118.29 mL
1 c	US cup	2 gi; 8 US fl oz	236.59 mL
1 pint; 1 US pt	US pint (liquid)	2 c; (16.65 imp fl oz of water)	0.47318 L
1 qt; 1 US qt	US quart (liquid)	2 US pt	0.94635 L
1 pot	US pottle (liquid)	2 US qt	1.8927 L
1 gal; 1 US gal	US gallon (liquid)	4 US qt; 231 cu in	3.7854 L
1 bbl	barrel (liquid)	31.5 US gal	119.24 L
1 bbl	oil barrel	1 1/3 bbl (liquid); 42 US gal	158.99 L
1 hogshead	hogshead	2 bbl (liquid); 1.5 bbl (oil); 63 US gal; 8.421875 cu ft	238.48 L

One US fluid ounce is 1/16 of a US pint, 1/32 of a US quart, and 1/128 of a US gallon. The teaspoon, tablespoon, and cup are defined in terms of a fluid ounce as 1/6, 1/2, and 8 fluid ounces respectively. The fluid ounce derives its name originally from being the volume of one ounce avoirdupois of water, but in the US it is defined as 1/128 of a US gallon. Consequently, a fluid ounce of water weighs about 1.041 ounces avoirdupois.

For nutritional labeling and medicine in the US, the teaspoon and tablespoon are defined as a metric teaspoon and tablespoon—precisely 5 mL and 15 mL respectively.

The saying, "a pint's a pound the world around", refers to 16 US fluid ounces of water weighing approximately (about 4% more than) one pound avoirdupois. An imperial pint of water weighs a pound and a quarter (20 oz).

There are varying standards for barrel for some specific commodities, including 31 gallons for beer, 40 gallons for whiskey or kerosene, and 42 gallons for petroleum. The general standard for liquids is 31.5 gal or half a hogshead. The common 55-gallon size of drum for storing and transporting various products and wastes is sometimes confused with a barrel, though it is not a standard measure.

In the U.S., single servings of beverages are usually measured in fluid ounces. Milk is usually sold in half-pints (8 fluid ounces), pints, quarts, half gallons, and gallons. Water volume for sinks, bathtubs, ponds, swimming pools, etc., is usually stated in gallons or cubic feet. Quantities of gases are usually given in cubic feet (at one atmosphere).

Minims, drams, gill, and pottle are rarely used currently. The gill is often referred to as a "half-cup". The pottle is often referred to as a "half-gallon".

=== Dry volume ===
List of US units of volume for dry goods
Unit	Name	Divisions	Metric equivalent
1 pt	pint (dry)	33.6003125 cu in	0.5506104713575 L
1 qt	quart (dry)	2 pt	1.101220942715 L
1 gal	gallon (dry)	4 qt	4.40488377086 L
1 pk	peck	2 gal	8.80976754172 L
1 bu	bushel	4 pk	35.23907016688 L
1 bbl	barrel (dry)	7056 cu in; 26.25 gal; (3.281 bu)	(115.627123584 L)

Dry volume is measured on a separate system, although many of the names remain the same. Small fruits and vegetables are often sold in dry pints and dry quarts.

While the US dry gallon is no longer used, and is no longer included in the handbook that many states recognize as the authority on measurement law, it implicitly exists since the US dry measures of bushel, peck, quart and pint are still in use. Pecks and bushels are sometimes used, particularly for grapes, apples and similar fruits in agricultural regions.

== Mass and weight ==
Conversions
Type	Unit	Name	Divisions	SI equivalent
Avoirdupois (Mass)	1 gr	grain	1/7000 lb	64.79891 mg
Avoirdupois (Mass)	1 dr	dram	27 11/32 gr; (8.859 carats)	1.771845195 g
Avoirdupois (Mass)	1 oz	ounce	16 drams	28.349523125 g
Avoirdupois (Mass)	1 lb	pound	16 oz	453.59237 g
Avoirdupois (Mass)	1 cwt; 1 US cwt	US (short) hundredweight	100 lb	45.359237 kg
Avoirdupois (Mass)	1 cwt; 1 long cwt	long hundredweight	112 lb	50.80234544 kg
Avoirdupois (Mass)	1 ton; 1 short ton	short ton	20 US cwt; 2,000 lb	907.18474 kg
Avoirdupois (Mass)	1 ton	long ton	20 long cwt; 2,240 lb	1,016.0469088 kg
Troy weight (Mass)	1 gr	grain	1/7000 lb; 1/5760 lbt	64.79891 mg
Troy weight (Mass)	1 dwt	pennyweight	24 gr; (7.776 carats)	1.55517384 g
Troy weight (Mass)	1 ozt	troy ounce	20 dwt	31.1034768 g
Troy weight (Mass)	1 lbt	troy pound	12 ozt; (13.16571429 oz)	373.2417216 g
English Engineering Units (Weight)	1 oz	oz	1/16 lb	≈0.278014 N
English Engineering Units (Weight)	1 lb	pound	16 oz	≈4.448222 N
English Engineering Units (Weight)	1 ton	ton	2,000 lb	≈8,896.443231 N

There have historically been five different English systems of mass: tower, apothecaries', troy, avoirdupois, and metric. Of these, the avoirdupois weight is the most common system used in the U.S., although Troy weight is still used to weigh precious metals. Apothecaries' weight—once used by pharmacies—has been largely replaced by metric measurements. Tower weight fell out of use in England (due to legal prohibition in 1527) centuries ago, and was never used in the U.S. The imperial system, which is still used for some measures in the United Kingdom and other countries, is based on avoirdupois, with variations from U.S. customary units larger than a pound.

The pound avoirdupois, which forms the basis of the U.S. customary system of mass, is defined as exactly 453.59237 grams by agreement between the U.S., the United Kingdom, and other English-speaking countries in 1959. Other units of mass are defined in terms of it.

The avoirdupois pound is legally defined as a measure of mass, but the name pound is also applied to measures of force. For instance, in many contexts, the pound avoirdupois is used as a unit of mass, but in some contexts, the term "pound" is used to refer to "pound-force". The slug is another unit of mass derived from pound-force.

Troy weight, avoirdupois weight, and apothecaries' weight are all built from the same basic unit, the grain, which is the same in all three systems. While each system has some overlap in the names of their units of measure (all have ounces and pounds), the relationship between the grain and these other units within each system varies. For example, in apothecary and troy weight, the pound and ounce are the same, but are different from the pound and ounce in avoirdupois in terms of their relationships to grains and to each other.

The systems also have different units between the grain and ounce (apothecaries' has scruple and dram, troy has pennyweight, and avoirdupois has just dram, sometimes spelled drachm). The dram in avoirdupois weighs just under half of the dram in apothecaries'. The fluid dram unit of volume is based on the weight of 1 dram of water in the apothecaries' system.

To alleviate confusion, it is typical when publishing non-avoirdupois weights to mention the name of the system along with the unit. Precious metals, for example, are often weighed in "troy ounces", because just "ounce" would be more likely to be assumed to mean an avoirdupois ounce.

For the pound and smaller units, the U.S. customary system and the British imperial system are identical. They differ when dealing with units larger than the pound. The definition of the pound avoirdupois in the imperial system is identical to that in the U.S. customary system.

In the U.S., only the ounce, pound and short ton – known in the country simply as the ton – are commonly used, though the hundredweight is still used in agriculture and shipping. The grain is used to describe the mass of propellant and projectiles in small arms ammunition. It was also used to measure medicine and other very small masses.

=== Grain measures ===
In agricultural practice, a bushel is a fixed volume of 2,150.42 cubic inches (35.2391 liters). The mass of grain will therefore vary according to density. Some nominal weight examples are:

- 1 bushel (corn) = 56 lb (25.4012 kg)
- 1 bushel (wheat) = 60 lb (27.2155 kg)
- 1 bushel (barley) = 48 lb (21.7724 kg)

== Cooking measures ==
Common volume measures in English-speaking countries (Comparable measures listed for comparison purposes.)
Measure	Australia	Canada	UK	US	US FDA
Teaspoon	5 mL	5 mL	5 mL	4.93 mL	5 mL
Dessertspoon	10 mL	—N/a	10 mL	—N/a	—N/a
Tablespoon	20 mL	15 mL	15 mL	14.79 mL	15 mL
Fluid ounce	—N/a	—N/a	28.41 mL	29.57 mL	30 mL
Cup	250 mL	250 mL	—N/a	236.59 mL	240 mL
Pint	570 mL	—N/a	568.26 mL	473.18 mL	—N/a
Quart	—N/a	—N/a	1.14 L	0.95 L	—N/a
Gallon	—N/a	—N/a	4.55 L	3.79 L	—N/a

The most common practical cooking measures for both liquid and dry ingredients in the U.S. are teaspoon, tablespoon, and cup, along with halves, thirds, quarters, and eighths of each. Units used are pounds, ounces, and fluid ounces. Common sizes are also used, such as can (presumed size varies depending on product), jar, square (e.g. of chocolate), stick (e.g. of butter), or portion of fruit or vegetable (e.g. a half lemon, two medium onions).

== Temperature ==
Degrees Fahrenheit are used in the U.S. to measure temperatures in most non-scientific contexts. The Rankine scale of absolute temperature is used in engineering thermodynamics when the Fahrenheit scale is employed. (0 °Ra = absolute zero = –459.67 °F) Scientists worldwide use the kelvin and degree Celsius. Several U.S. technical standards are expressed in Fahrenheit temperatures, and some American medical practitioners use degrees Fahrenheit for body temperature.

The relationship between the different temperature scales is linear but the scales have different zero points, so conversion is not simply multiplication by a factor. Pure water freezes at 32 °F = 0 °C and boils at 212 °F = 100 °C at 1 atm. The conversion formula is:
$$\{T\}_\mathrm{^\circ F} = \tfrac{9}{5} \{T\}_\mathrm{^\circ C} + 32$$

or inversely as
$$\{T\}_\mathrm{^\circ C} = \tfrac{5}{9}\bigl(\{T\}_\mathrm{^\circ F} - 32\bigr).$$

== Other units ==
Length

- 1 hand = 4 in = 101.6 mm
- 1 U (rack unit) = 1.75 in = 44.45 mm

Volume

- 1 board-foot = 1 ft × 1 ft × 1 in = 2.360 L

Mass

- 1 slug = 1 lbf⋅s^{2}/ft ≈ 14.59390 kg

Force

- 1 poundal = force to accelerate 1 pound mass 1 foot/second/second ≈ 0.138 newtons.
- 1 kip = 1000 lbf ≈ 4.44822 kN

Energy

- 1 foot-pound ≈ 1.356 J
- 1 British thermal unit (Btu) ≈ 1.055 kJ (1,054–1,060 J, depending on which of several definitions of Btu is used)
- 1 Quad 10^{15} Btu, one quadrillion Btu (short-scale) or 1.055×10^{18} joule (1.055 exajoules or EJ)

Power

- 1 horsepower ≈ 745.7 W
- 1 ton of refrigeration (12,000 Btu/h) = 3.517 kW

Pressure

- 1 inch of mercury = the pressure produced by 1 inch height of mercury = 3,386.39 pascals (33.8639 hPa, millibars)
- 1 pound per square inch (psi) ≈ 6,895 Pa

Torque

- 1 pound-foot ≈ 1.356 N⋅m

Insulation

- 1 R-value (ft^{2}⋅°F⋅h/Btu) ≈ 0.1761 R_{SI} (K⋅m^{2}/W)

Various combination units are in common use; these are straightforwardly defined based on the above basic units.

Sizing systems are used for various items in commerce, several of which are U.S.-specific:

- US standard clothing size
- American wire gauge is used for most metal wire.
- Scoop (utensil) sizes, numbered by scoops per quart
- Thickness of leather is measured in ounces, 1 oz equals 1/64 inch (0.40 mm).
- Bolts and screws follow the Unified Thread Standard rather than the ISO metric screw thread standard.
- Knitting needles in the United States are measured according to a non-linear unitless numerical system.
- Thickness of aluminum foil is measured in mils (1/1000 inch, or 0.0254 mm) in the United States.
- Cross-sectional area of electrical wire is measured in circular mils in the U.S. and Canada, one circular mil (cmil) being equal to 5.067×10^{−4} mm^{2} (or 7.854×10^{−7} in^{2}). Since this is so small, actual wire is commonly measured in thousands of a cmil, called either kcmil or MCM.
- The mil or thou is also sometimes used to mean thousandth of an inch.
- Sheet metal in the U.S. is commonly measured in gauge (not to be confused with the American wire gauge), which is derived from weight and thus differs by material.
- Nominal Pipe Size is used for the outside diameter of pipes. Below NPS14, the NPS number is not consistent with the pipe diameter in inches.
- Copper tubing, however, is measured in nominal size, 1/8 inch less than the outside diameter.
- The Schedule system is used for standard pipe thicknesses.
- Alcohol content is frequently given in proof, 2 × percent alcohol by volume
- The cord is used for volume of firewood.
- The square is used to mean 100 square feet in construction.
- Heat flux in the U.S. is measured in langleys.

== Other names for U.S. customary units ==
The U.S. Code refers to these units as "traditional systems of weights and measures".

Other common ways of referring to the system are: customary, standard, English, or imperial, which refers to the post-1824 reform measures used throughout the British Empire & Commonwealth countries. Another term is the foot–pound–second (FPS) system, as opposed to centimeter–gram–second (CGS) and meter–kilogram–second (MKS) systems.

Tools and fasteners with sizes measured in inches are sometimes called "SAE bolts" or "SAE wrenches" to differentiate them from their metric counterparts. The Society of Automotive Engineers (SAE) originally developed fasteners standards using U.S. units for the U.S. auto industry. The organization now largely uses metric units.

== See also ==
- Board foot
- Conversion of units
- History of measurement and units of measurement
- Plan for Establishing Uniformity in the Coinage, Weights, and Measures of the United States (1790)
- Mars Climate Orbiter, which failed due to a measurement-units-related software bug
- Standard cubic foot
