= List of types of spoons =

This is a list of types of spoons used for eating, cooking, and serving:

== Eating utensils ==
Spoons are primarily used to transfer edibles from vessel to mouth, usually at a dining table. A spoon's style is usually named after a food or drink with which they are most often used, the material with which they are composed, or a feature of their appearance or structure.

- Baby spoon — a small spoon used for feeding baby food to an infant or toddler. Many are made of soft material. Some have vertical loops for easier holding, or a planar guard to prevent inserting the utensil too far into the mouth. "Pap" is a colloquial term for baby food, so some of these utensils are known as "pap spoons".
- Bouillon spoon — round-bowled, somewhat smaller than a soup spoon
- Caviar spoon — usually made of mother of pearl, gold, animal horn, or wood, but not silver, which would affect the taste
- Chinese spoon — a type of soup spoon with a short, thick handle extending directly from a deep, flat bowl.
- Coffee spoon — small, for use with after-dinner coffee cups (coffee spoons are usually smaller than teaspoons)
- Cutty — short, chiefly Scot and Irish
- Demitasse spoon — diminutive, smaller than a coffee spoon; for traditional coffee drinks in specialty cups and for spooning cappuccino froth
- Dessert spoon — intermediate in size between a teaspoon and a tablespoon, used in eating dessert and sometimes soup or cereals
- Egg spoon — for eating soft boiled eggs; with a shorter handle and bowl than a teaspoon, and a bowl broadly round across the end, rather than pointed, intended to enable the user to scrape soft-boiled egg out of the shell
- Grapefruit spoon or orange spoon — tapers to a sharp point or teeth, used for citrus fruits and melons
- Gumbo or Chowder spoon — larger round bowl, approximately 7 inches (18 cm)
- Horn spoon — a spoon made of horn, used chiefly interjectionally in the phrase By the Great Horn Spoon!, as in the children's novel of that title by Sid Fleischman. Horn spoons are still used for eating boiled eggs because they do not tarnish (like silver) from the sulfurous yolk. Horn (or mother of pearl) are used for caviar, since a silver spoon would unpleasantly affect the taste of the delicate roe.
- Iced tea spoon or parfait spoon — with a bowl similar in size and shape to that of a teaspoon, and with a long slim handle, used in stirring tall drinks, or eating parfait, sundaes, sorbets, or similar foods served in tall glasses
- Korean spoon — long-handled, often with shallow point at end of bowl
- Marrow spoon or marrow scoop — 18th century, often of silver, with a long thin bowl suitable for removing marrow from a bone
- Melon spoon — often silver, used for eating melon
- Plastic spoon — cheap, disposable, flexible, stain resistant, sometimes biodegradable; black, white, colored, or clear; smooth, non-porous surface; varied types and uses
- Rattail spoon — developed in the later 17th century; with a thin pointed tongue on the bottom of the bowl to reinforce the joint of bowl and handle
- Salt spoon — miniature, used with an open salt cellar for individual service
- Saucier spoon — slightly flattened spoon with a notch in one side; used for drizzling sauces over fish or other delicate foods.
- Soup spoon — with a large or rounded bowl for eating soup.
  - Cream-soup spoon — round-bowled, slightly shorter than a standard soup spoon
- Teaspoon — small, suitable for stirring and sipping tea or coffee; standard capacity one third of a tablespoon; a cooking measure of volume
- Tablespoon — sometimes used for ice cream and soup; standard capacity of three teaspoons; a cooking measure of volume
- M1926 spoon — Army issue with mess kits from 1941 to 2002, volume of two tablespoons
- Seal-top spoon — silver, end of handle in the form of a circular seal; popular in England in the later 16th and 17th centuries
- Spork, sporf, spife, splayd, etc. — differing combinations of a spoon with a fork or knife
- Stroon — a straw with a spoon on the end for eating slushies, etc.

== Cooking and serving utensils ==
Spoons primarily used in food preparation, handling, or serving, in the kitchen or at the table. Most are named after an edible for which they are specially designed. Two utensils with spoon-shaped ends are also included.

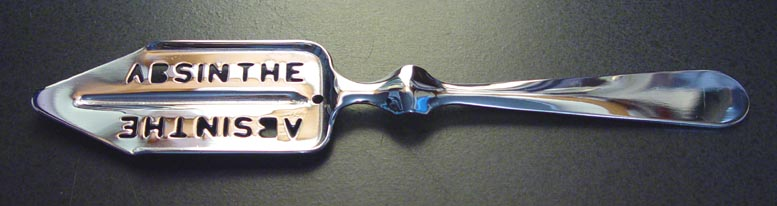
Absinthe spoon

- Absinthe spoon — perforated or slotted to dissolve a sugar cube in a glass of absinthe; normally flat bowl, with a notch in the handle where it rests on the rim of a glass
- Bar spoon — long-handled equivalent to a teaspoon, used in measuring ingredients for mixed drinks
- Berry spoon — large, with a broad deep bowl; used in serving berries, salad, and other juicy foods
- Bonbon spoon — with a flat perforated bowl for bonbons and nuts
- Caddy spoon — used for measuring tea leaves; traditionally made of silver
- Chutney spoon — for hygienically dispensing chutneys, especially mango chutney, from a communal open or lidded dish; the two are usually manufactured together as part of a multi-purpose dispenser in restaurants; alternatively may come with a specially designed and matching chutney spoon holder for domestic use

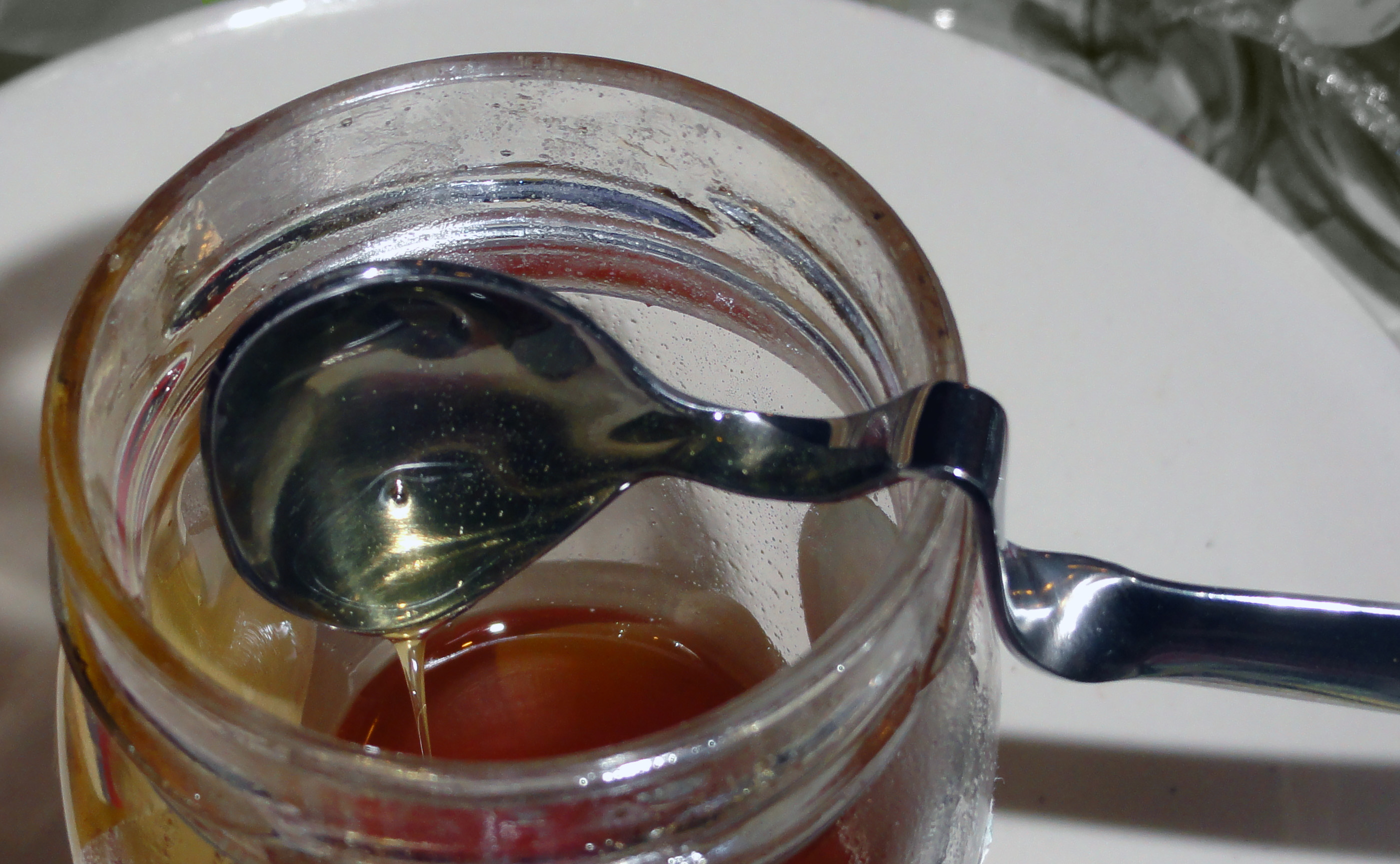
A honey spoon

- Honey spoon — for taking some honey from a pot or jar; a series of disks that provide a large surface area for the viscous fluid to hang on to, rather than a bowl-shaped utensil
- Jelly or Jam spoon — for serving fruit preserves; sometimes with a point and an odd-shaped edge; sometimes used with a jelly jar
- Ladle — with a deep bowl and a long handle attached at a steep angle, to scoop and convey liquids

Mote spoon

- Mote spoon — perforated, used to sieve loose tea from a cup; handle finial has a spike to unclog the teapot spout
- Mustard spoon — for serving mustard; usually small, with a deep bowl elongated to form a scoop and set at right angles to the handle
- Olive spoon — used to remove olives from their liquid, while allowing the liquid to drain easily from the spoon; typically made from stainless steel; has slots or a hole cut from the bottom of a bowl-shaped head to release the liquid from the spoon; also used to lift cherries, cocktail onions, pickled garlic and similar condiments from the liquids used to store the foods
- Panja — serving spoon for rice used in India, with four finger-shaped indentations and a flat surface. Typically also has a hole at the end where a loop or string is tied to enable easy storage.
- Rice spoon — for serving rice (known in Japan as a shamoji)
- Salt spoon — miniature, used with an open salt cellar for individual service
- Serving spoon — serves and portions salads, vegetables, and fruits; larger than a tablespoon; bowl round rather than oval, to take up food more easily; long handle
- Slotted spoon — used in food preparation; has slots, holes, or other openings in the bowl which let liquid pass through while preserving the larger solids on top
- Spaghetti spoon — have large tines for ladling cooked spaghetti and sometimes a hole in the middle to measure uncooked spaghetti.
- Stilton scoop — designed with a more spade-shaped bowl for scooping from the center of a Stilton cheese, which crumbles easily, without disturbing the rind.
- Straw spoon—the curved spoon end of a straw, typically used for eating the remains of ice-blended drinks
- Stirrer — utensil with a long stem and usually a spoon end for mixing drinks
- Sugar spoon or sugar shell — for serving granulated sugar; bowl often molded in the form of a sea shell
- Tablespoon — large, usually used for serving (UK); main kind of spoon used for eating (US)
- Tasting spoon – Called cuillère à goûter in French, used to taste dish components while cooking; chefs draw from one container of clean spoons and discard into another for hygiene and food safety. Size, shape, and material are chef's choice.
- Wooden spoon — made of wood, commonly used in food preparation
- Ice-cream spoon — it is used to scoop ice cream into round shape.

== Other objects ==
Items in the form of spoons used for ceremonial or commemorative purposes, or for functions other than ingesting comestibles.

- Anointing spoon or coronation spoon — a silver spoon, part of the Crown Jewels of the United Kingdom, the regalia used for the coronation of English monarchs; first used in the 12th century
- Apostle spoon — a christening gift with the bust of an apostle as the finial
- Cochlear — spoon used in the Eastern Orthodox Church in serving the consecrated wine, sometimes with a particle of the sacramental bread
- Ear spoon — a small spoon used to remove earwax, more common before the marketing of cotton-tipped swabs for this purpose
- Lovespoon — a wooden spoon, often with double bowl, formerly carved by a Welsh suitor as a gift of betrothal for his promised bride
- Maidenhead spoon — 16th century silver or silver-gilt spoon with handle terminating in a bust of the Virgin Mary
- Silver spoon — a small spoon given to a newborn child to ensure good fortune; used as a metaphor for someone born to riches
- Snuff spoon – a small spoon used to take snuff, used to avoid staining the fingers with powder. These spoons are so small that they are frequently mistaken for the toy ones. The designs of the snuff spoons closely followed that of the larger ones, and thus can be used to date the étuis containing them
- Souvenir spoon — decorative, used to commemorate a place or event
- Uddharani — a small gold, silver, copper, or brass spoon used for Achamana and offering water during Hindu prayers (puja)
- Wooden spoon — a spoon made of wood presented originally at Cambridge University to the man ranking lowest among those taking honors in the Mathematical Tripos, and at other colleges and universities to other selected recipients
- Water Dipper — a spoon with a very big bowl, used for scooping water to take a bath
- Siwur — a dipper made of coconut shell that is usually used for bathing. It is the main component to perform the jailangkung ritual

== Sources ==
- Jackson, Charles James (1911). "The spoon and its history: Its form, material, and development". An Illustrated History of English Plate, Ecclesiastical and Secular: In which the Development of Form and Decoration in the Silver and Gold Work of the British Isles, from the Earliest Known Examples to the Latest of the Georgian Period, is Delineated and Described, Volume 2. "Country life," limited. pp. 470–537. OCLC 1074655150.
