= Sterling silver =

Alloy of silver

Sterling silver is an alloy composed by weight of 92.5% silver and 7.5% other metals, usually copper. The sterling silver standard has a minimum millesimal fineness of 925.

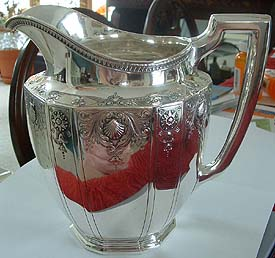
Tiffany & Co. pitcher (c. 1871) having paneled sides and repoussé design with shells, scrolls and flowers; top edge is repousse arrowhead leaf design

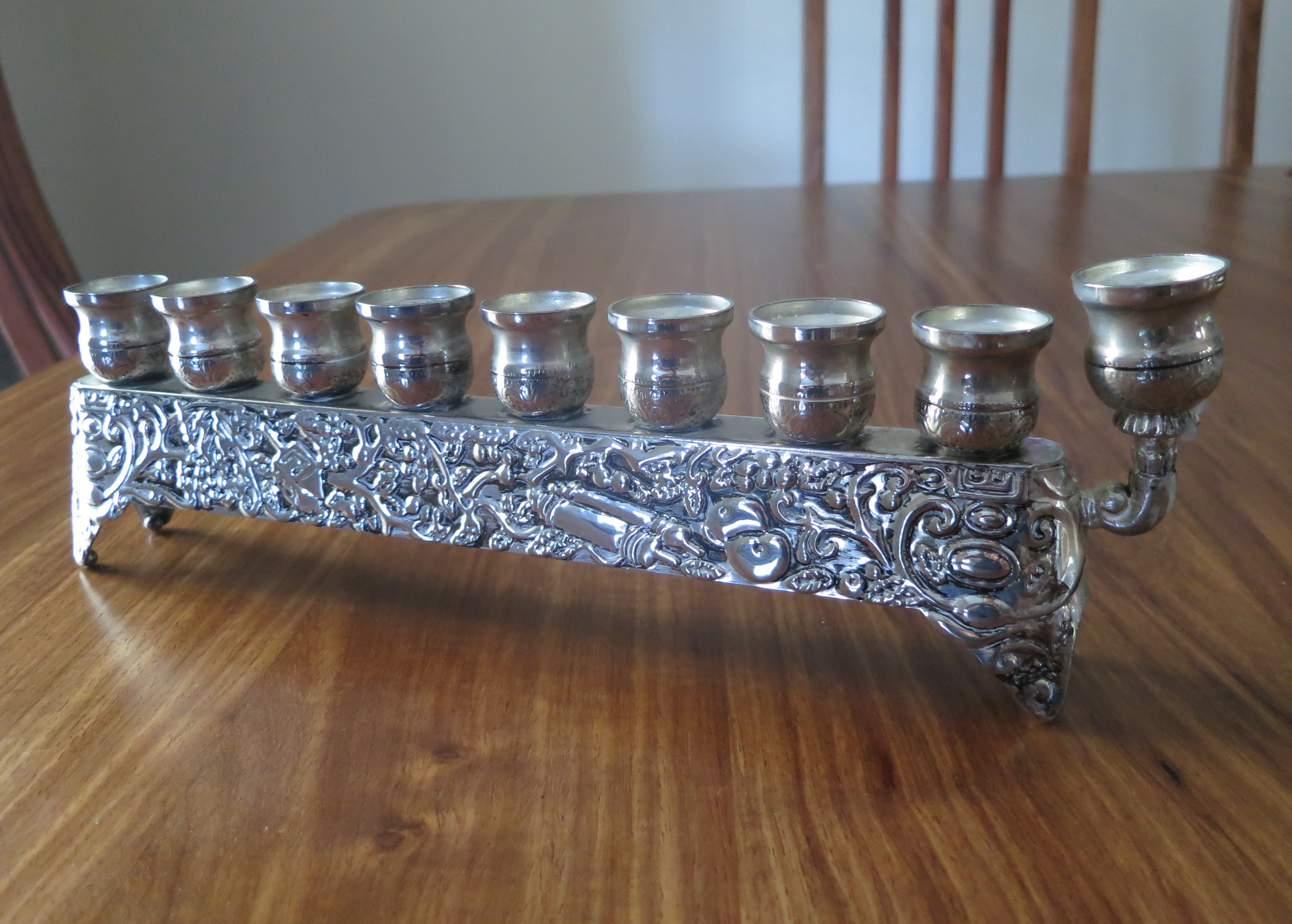
A Macedonian sterling silver Hanukkah menorah

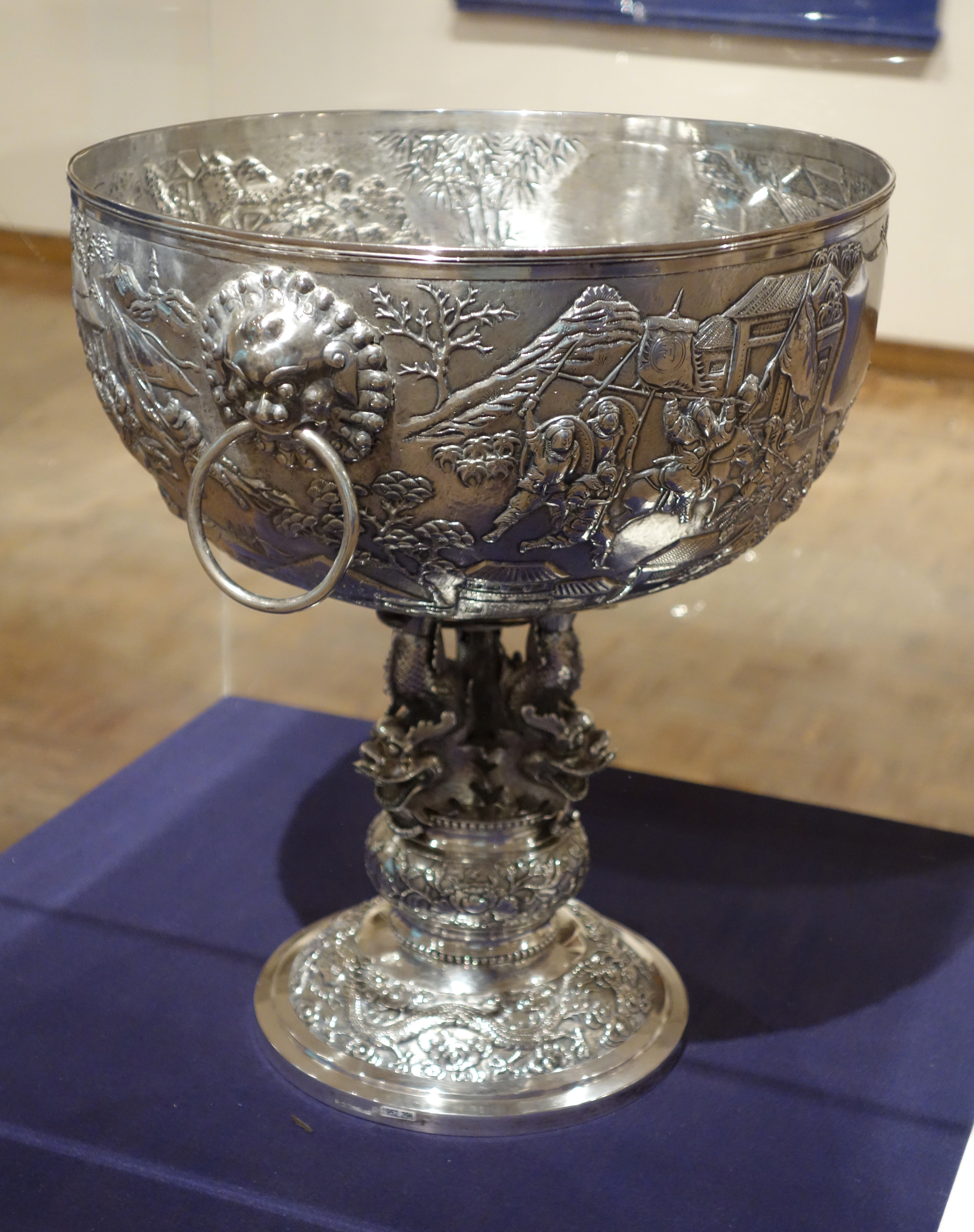
A Chinese export sterling silver punch bowl, c. 1875 (from the Huntington Museum of Art)

Fine silver, which is 99.9% pure silver, is relatively soft, so silver is usually alloyed with copper to increase its hardness and strength. Sterling silver is prone to tarnishing, and elements other than copper can be used in alloys to reduce tarnishing, as well as casting porosity and firescale. Such elements include germanium, zinc, platinum, silicon, and boron. Recent examples of these alloys include argentium, sterlium and silvadium.

== Etymology ==
The term sterling silver originally meant "silver fit to be used in the making of sterlings", sterling being another name for the English silver penny. The etymology of sterling itself is unclear and disputed.

== History ==
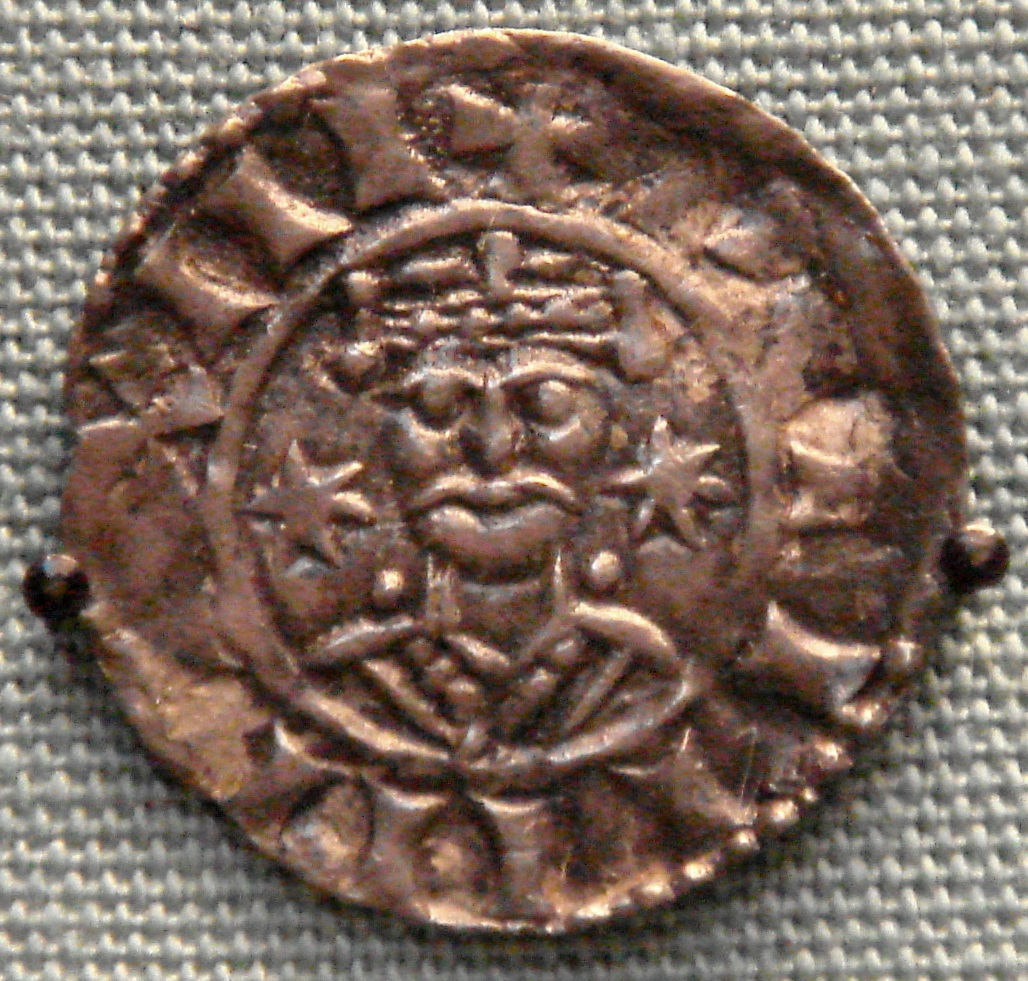
Norman silver pennies changed designs every three years. This two-star design (possible origin of the word "sterling"), issued by William the Conqueror, is from 1077 to 1080.

A piece of sterling silver dating from Henry II's reign was used as a standard in the Trial of the Pyx until it was deposited at the Royal Mint in 1843. It bears the royal stamp ENRI. REX ("King Henry") but this was added later, in the reign of Henry III. The first legal definition of sterling silver appeared in 1275, when a statute of Edward I specified that 12 troy ounces of silver for coinage should contain 11 ounces 2 1/4 pennyweights of silver and 17 3/4 pennyweights of alloy, with 20 pennyweights to the troy ounce. This is approximately a millesimal fineness of 926.

In Colonial America, sterling silver was used for currency and general goods as well. Between 1634 and 1776, some 500 silversmiths created items in the "New World" ranging from simple buckles to ornate Rococo coffee pots. Although silversmiths of this era were typically familiar with all precious metals, they primarily worked in sterling silver. The colonies lacked an assay office until 1814, so American silversmiths adhered to the standard set by the London Goldsmiths Company: sterling silver consisted of 91.5–92.5% by weight silver and 8.5–7.5 wt% copper. Stamping each of their pieces with their personal maker's mark, colonial silversmiths relied upon their own reputation to guarantee the quality and composition of their products.

Colonial silversmiths used many techniques developed in Europe. Casting was frequently the first step in manufacturing silver pieces, as silver workers would melt down sterling silver into easily manageable ingots. Occasionally, they would create small components (e.g. teapot legs) by casting silver into iron or graphite molds, but it was rare for an entire piece to be fabricated via casting.

Silversmiths would forge an ingot into the desired shape by hammering at room temperature; this cold forming process work hardens the silver, which becomes increasingly brittle and difficult to shape. To restore the workability, the silversmith would anneal the piece—that is, heat it to a dull red and then quench it in water—to relieve the stresses in the material and return it to a more ductile state.

Hammering took more time than all other silver manufacturing processes, so it accounted for the majority of labor costs. Silversmiths would then seam parts together to create complex and artistic items, sealing the gaps with a solder of 80 wt% silver and 20 wt% bronze. Finally, they would file and polish their work to remove the seams, finishing off with engraving and stamping the smith's mark.

The American revolutionary Paul Revere was regarded as one of the best silversmiths from this "Golden Age of American Silver". Following the Revolutionary War, Revere acquired and made use of a silver rolling mill from England. Not only did the rolling mill increase his production—hammering and flattening silver took most of a silversmith's time—he was able to roll and sell silver of appropriate, uniform thickness to other silversmiths. He retired a wealthy artisan, his success partly due to this strategic investment. Although he is celebrated for his beautiful hollowware, Revere made his fortune primarily on low-end goods produced by the mill, such as flatware. With the onset of the first Industrial Revolution, silversmithing declined as an artistic occupation.

From about 1840 to 1940 in the United States and Europe, sterling silver cutlery (US: 'flatware') became de rigueur when setting a proper table. There was a marked increase in the number of silver companies that emerged during that period. The height of the silver craze was during the 50-year period from 1870 to 1920. Flatware lines during this period sometimes included up to 100 different types of pieces.

== Uses ==
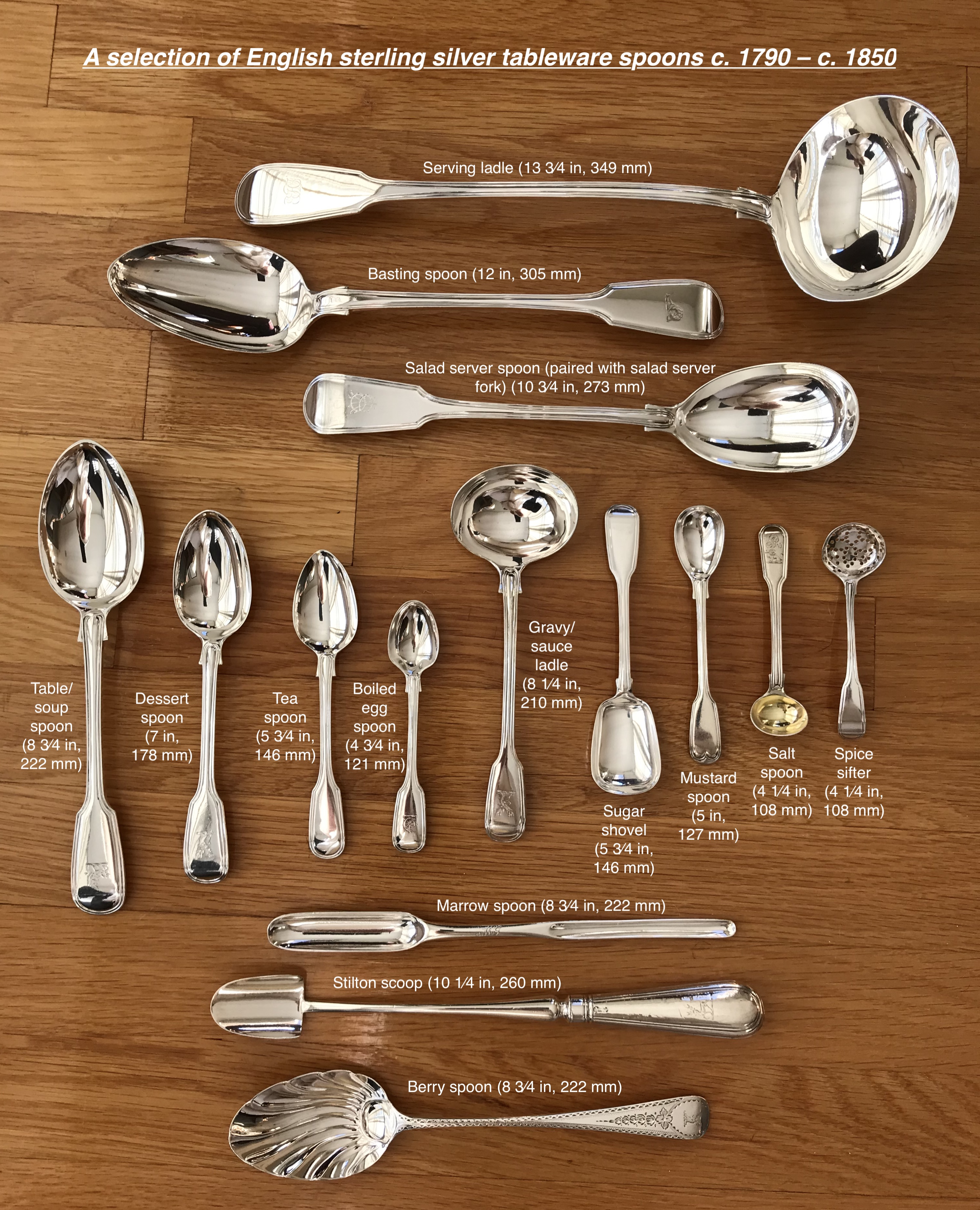
A selection of English sterling silver tableware spoons

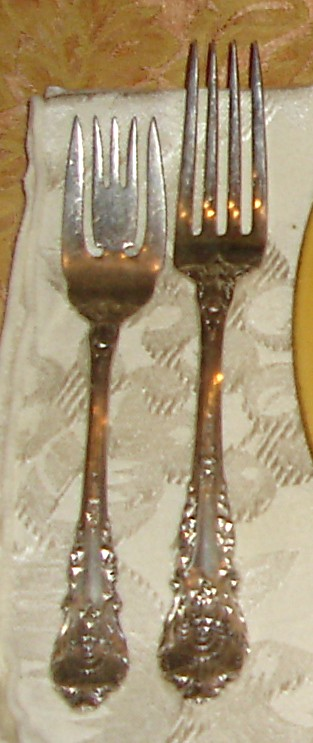
Pair of sterling silver forks

Individual eating implements often included:

- forks (dinner fork, salad fork, pastry fork, or shrimp fork)
- spoons (teaspoon, coffee spoon, demitasse spoon, iced tea spoon) and
- knives (dinner knife, butter spreader, cheese knife).

This was especially true during the Victorian period, when etiquette dictated no food should be touched with one's fingers.

Serving pieces were often elaborately decorated and pierced and embellished with ivory, and could include any or all of the following: carving knife and fork, salad knife and fork, cold meat fork, punch ladle, soup ladle, gravy ladle, casserole-serving spoon, berry spoon, lasagna server, macaroni server, asparagus server, cucumber server, tomato server, olive spoon, cheese scoop, fish knife and fork, pastry server, petit four server, cake knife, bon bon spoon, salt spoon, sugar sifter or caster and crumb remover with brush.

Cutlery sets were often accompanied by tea sets, hot water pots, chocolate pots, trays and salvers, goblets, demitasse cups and saucers, liqueur cups, bouillon cups, egg cups, plates, napkin rings, water and wine pitchers and coasters, candelabra and even elaborate centerpieces.

The interest in sterling silver extended to business (paper clips, mechanical pencils, letter openers, calling card boxes, cigarette cases), to the boudoir (dresser trays, mirrors, hair and suit brushes, pill bottles, manicure sets, shoehorns, perfume bottles, powder bottles, hair clips) and even to children (cups, cutlery, rattles).

Other uses for sterling silver include:

- Use as surgical and medical instruments as early as Ur, Hellenistic-era Egypt and Rome, and their use continued until largely replaced in Western countries in the mid to late 20th century by cheaper, disposable plastic items and sharper, more durable steel ones. The alloy's natural malleability is an obvious physical advantage, but it is also naturally aseptic.
- Some brasswind instrument manufacturers use 92.5% sterling silver as the material for making their instruments, including the flute and saxophone. For example, some leading saxophone manufacturers such as Selmer and Yanagisawa have crafted some of their saxophones from sterling silver.
- Use as jewelry, such as rings, bracelets, earrings and necklaces.

== Tarnish and corrosion ==
Silver is not a very reactive metal and does not react with oxygen or water at ordinary temperatures, so does not easily oxidize. However, it is attacked by common components of atmospheric pollution. Silver sulfide slowly appears as a black tarnish during exposure to airborne compounds of sulfur (byproducts of the burning of fossil fuels and some industrial processes), and low level ozone reacts to form silver oxide. As the purity of the silver decreases, the problem of corrosion or tarnishing increases because other metals in the alloy, usually copper, may react with oxygen in the air.

The black silver sulfide (Ag_{2}S) is among the most insoluble salts in aqueous solution, a property that is exploited for separating silver ions from other positive ions.

Sodium chloride (NaCl) or common table salt is known to corrode silver-copper alloy, typically seen in silver salt shakers where corrosion appears around the holes in the top.

Several products have been developed for the purpose of polishing silver that serve to remove sulfur from the metal without damaging or warping it. Because harsh polishing and buffing can permanently damage and devalue a piece of antique silver, valuable items are typically hand-polished to preserve the unique patinas of older pieces. Techniques such as wheel polishing, which are typically performed by professional jewelers or silver repair companies, are reserved for extreme tarnish or corrosion.

== See also ==
- Britannia silver, a higher grade silver alloy (95.8% compared to Sterling silver's 92.5%)
- Argentium sterling silver, a higher grade silver alloy with unique working properties (93.6% or 96%)
- Coin silver, .900 fine silver widely used in pre-1964 United States coinage
- Pound sterling, the official currency of the United Kingdom, which once was based on a weight in sterling silver
- Weighted sterling, items with a silver surface and a composite of other materials
