= Silver standards =

Standards of millesimal fineness

Silver standards refer to the standards of millesimal fineness for the silver alloy used in the manufacture or crafting of silver objects. This list is organized from highest to lowest millesimal fineness, or purity of the silver.

- Fine silver has a millesimal fineness of 999. Also called pure silver, or three nines fine, fine silver contains 99.9% silver, with the balance being some trace amounts of impurities. This grade of silver is used to make bullion bars for international commodities trading and investment in silver. In the modern world, fine silver is understood to be too soft for general use.
- Britannia silver has a millesimal fineness of at least 958. The alloy is 95.84% pure silver and 4.16% copper or other metals. The Britannia standard was developed in Britain in 1697 to help prevent British sterling silver coins from being melted to make silver plate. It was obligatory in Britain between 1697 and 1720, when the sterling silver standard was restored. It became an optional standard thereafter.
- The French 1st standard has a milessimal fineness of 950. The French 1st alloy is 95% silver and 5% copper or other metals.
- 91 zolotnik Russian silver has a millesimal fineness of 947. The zolotnik (Russian золотник, from the Russian zoloto, or золото, meaning gold) was used in Russia as early as the 11th century to denote the weight of gold coins. In its earliest usage, the zolotnik was 1/96 of a pound, but it later was changed to represent 1/72 of a pound. Ninety-one (91) zolotniks have the equivalent millesimal fineness of 947[9]. Thus, the alloy contains 94.79% pure silver and 5.21% copper or other metals.
- Sterling silver has a millesimal fineness of 925. The sterling silver alloy is 92.5% pure silver and 7.5% copper or other metals. This alloy was used by England and then the United Kingdom from the early 12th century, and Canada, Australia and other countries associated with the British Empire (and later Commonwealth) from the 19th century up to the mid-20th century when debasement took place; Sterling silver’s copper content means that it has a stronger tendency to tarnish than other alloys used in coins.
- 88 zolotnik Russian silver has the equivalent millesimal fineness of 916[6]. The alloy contains 91.66% pure silver and 8.34% copper or other metals. (The description of the zolotnik is above.)
- Coin silver has a millesimal fineness of 900. The term "coin silver" was derived from the fact that much of it was made from melting down silver coins. It is important here to note that there are differences between the coin silver standard and the coin silver alloy, as actually used in making silver objects. The coin silver standard in the United States was 90% silver and 10% copper, as dictated by US FTC guidelines. However, in silversmithing, coins could come from other nations besides the United States, and thus coin silver objects could vary from 750 millesimal fineness (75% silver) to 900 (90% silver). Coins were used as a source of silver in the US until 1868, shortly after the discovery of the Comstock silver lodes in Nevada, which provided a significant source of silver. Around this time the sterling standard was adopted by the American silver industry.
- 84 zolotnik Russian silver has the equivalent millesimal fineness of 875. The alloy contains 87.5% pure silver and 12.5% copper or other metals. (See above for description of the zolotnik.)
- Scandinavian silver has a millesimal fineness of 830. The Scandinavian silver alloy contains 83% pure silver and 17% copper or other metals.
- Continental silver has millennial fineness of 800, the traditional minimum standard for silver items in Germany, Austria, Switzerland, and Italy. Because of its commonness in Germany, it is sometimes called "German silver", but that term more commonly refers to a silvery-appearing cupronickel alloy also called nickel silver that contains no actual silver.
- Following a program of debasements in the early-to-mid 20th century, circulating Canadian coinage (with the exception of the nickel) had a millesimal fineness of 800 until 1968. The alloy used contained 80% silver and 20% copper.
- Decoplata has the equivalent millesimal fineness of 720. The alloy contains 72% pure silver and 28% copper. It was used by a number of countries between the 19th century and the present, but it is most associated with coins made in Mexico and the Netherlands in the mid-20th Century.
