= Stirrer =

Stirrer may refer to:

- Agitator, a general type of mechanical device
- Magnetic stirrer, a laboratory device
- Stirring rod, a simple laboratory tool
- Stir stick, for stirring drinks
- Stirring spoon, a type of spoon
- Whisk or other kind of stirrer used in cooking
- Mixer (appliance), a kitchen appliance
