= Argentium sterling silver =

Brand of tarnish-resistant silver alloys

Argentium silver (patented in 1998) is a brand of modern tarnish-resistant silver alloys, containing either 93.5%, 94% or 96% silver. Argentium alloys replace some of the copper in the traditional sterling silver (92.5% silver + 7.5% copper) with the metalloid germanium. (Note: Approximately 1% of the Argentium alloy total weight is germanium; the patent refers to possible trace amounts of boron, no more than 20 ppm.) Argentium 935, Argentium 940 and Argentium 960 alloys exceed the standard required for hallmarking as sterling silver, and Argentium 960 silver meets the standard for hallmarking as Britannia silver (95.84% silver).

== Origins and description ==
Argentium silver is the result of research at the Art and Design Research Institute (ADRI), School of Art & Design, Middlesex University, by Peter Johns and colleagues. The project began in 1990 with research on the effects of germanium additions to silver alloys. Germanium was discovered to impart the following properties to sterling silver:

- firescale elimination
- high tarnish resistance
- precipitation hardening and simple heat-hardening properties
- increased ductility
- increased thermal and electrical resistivity (Note: Increased resistance improves alloys' suitability for welding and laser forming.)
- environmental advantages (Note: The "environmental" advantages result from eliminating the need for harsh chemicals involved in removing or plating over firescale.)

Many of these properties significantly affect the traditional methods of working silver. For instance the absence of firescale eliminates tedious and time-consuming steps required by the silver worker using traditional sterling silver. It also eliminates the need for plating the final product which is often done on manufactured items because of the problems introduced by firescale. Tarnish resistance is of significant importance to both silver workers and the wearer of silver jewellery.

In 1994, Peter Johns obtained U.S. utility patent protection relating to silver/germanium alloys and methods for joining materials using such alloys. The patent subsequently expired in 2016. Subsequent patents relating to Argentium technology have also been granted, including U.S. Patent No. US9708691B2, assigned to Argentium International Limited, relating to investment casting processes and casting grain. Patents relating to Argentium technology have also been registered or granted in other jurisdictions. In the United States, an earlier ARGENTIUM trademark registration, U.S. Registration No. 3337868, was cancelled in 2014 following the non-filing of the declaration required under Section 8 of the Lanham Act. Subsequent U.S. ARGENTIUM trademark registrations have also been obtained for specified goods and services.

== Physical properties ==
Refractory temperatures
Silver alloy	Solidus melting temperature		Liquidus flow point temperature	
Silver alloy	°C	°F	°C	°F
traditional sterling silver	802 °C	1475 °F	899 °C	1650 °F
argentium 940	860 °C	1580 °F	895 °C	1643 °F
argentium 960	890 °C	1634 °F	920 °C	1688 °F
