= Iced tea spoon =

Kind of spoon

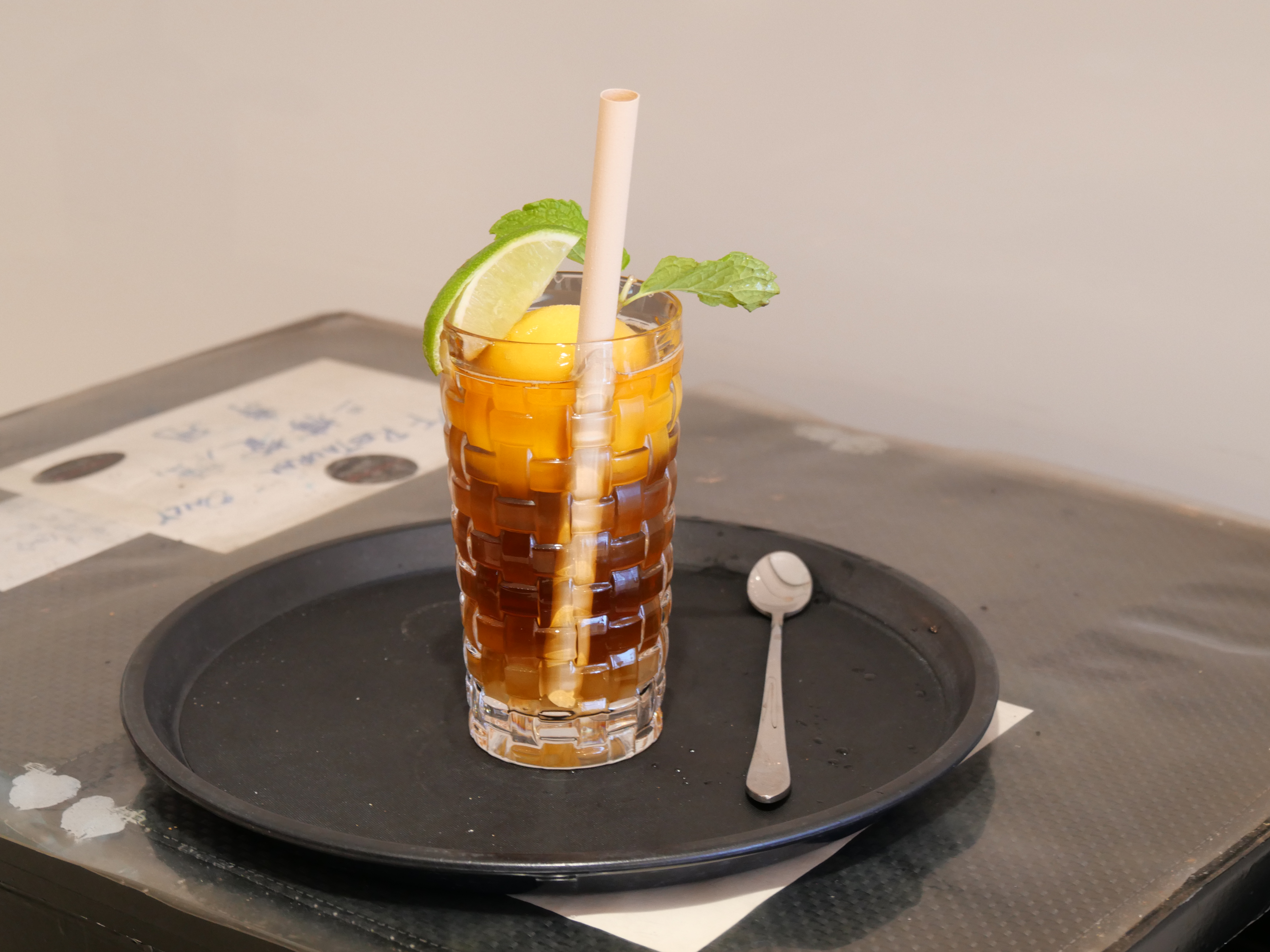
Iced tea with an iced tea spoon

An iced tea spoon, also called a soda spoon or a latte spoon, is a thin spoon with a long handle. Similar in proportion of bowl to a teaspoon, it is used primarily in the United States for stirring sugar or other sweeteners into iced tea or iced coffee and latte macchiato, which are traditionally served in tall glasses.

Originally known as a parfait spoon, it is also commonly used for eating ice cream, especially when served in tall glasses, such as floats and sundaes.

== See also ==
- List of types of spoons
- Bar spoon
- Demitasse spoon
- Soda jerk
