= Firestain =

Oxidation on copper alloys

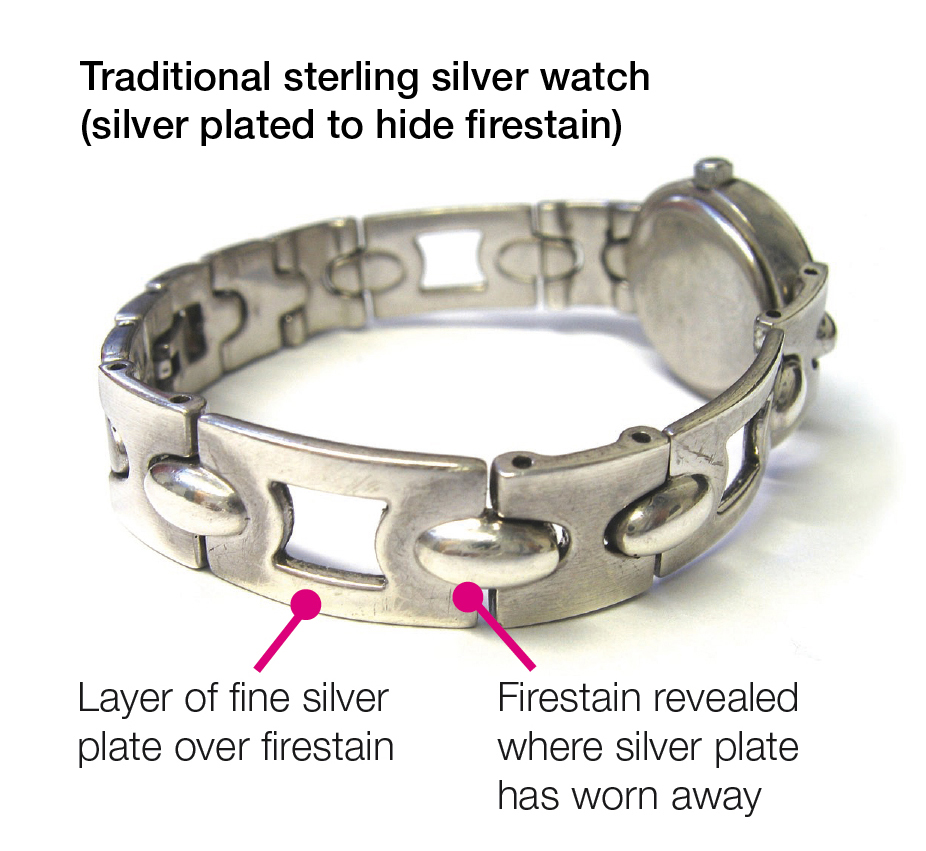
Example of firestain on silver jewellery

Firestain is a layer of oxides that can form on the surface of objects made of metal alloys containing copper when such objects are heated, as by soldering for jewellery repair.

At high temperatures, any oxygen gas present can react with copper in alloys, as of gold or of silver, to form cupric oxide and then cuprous oxide, disrupting the alloys' bright surface. First the oxidized copper will form a black top layer called firescale, which is superficial and can be rubbed away after pickling. However, an alloy containing sufficient copper that is heated hot enough or long enough will be tainted with firestain, a permanent discoloration with a subtle red-purple color, most common in sterling silver because of its permeability. Repeated heating increases the risk of firestain, which can be prevented, repaired, or minimized by various methods.

== Preventative methods ==
Firestain can be largely prevented by heating the object in an atmosphere in which the oxygen has been replaced with another combustive gas such as hydrogen or ammonia. Chemical agents called fluxes can reduce firestain when applied to metals before heating. Flux is usually made out of borax but other chemical compounds also have applications as fluxes.

== Curative methods ==
Techniques such as polishing, sanding, grinding, filing, and wire brushing can be used to cure existing firestain. As the layer of firestain is often not very deep, this approach, with sufficient effort and time, may be able to remove it. However, this inevitably results in a loss of material to the piece, and will cause any fine details to the piece to be lost. However, it does not involve the use of any special gasses or changes to the heating atmosphere around the piece.

As another cure, objects can also be "bombed" or electrostripped. This involves placing them in a bath of a usually cyanide-based solution (sometimes other solutions such as nitric acid may be used instead) and applying a high-density electric current arranged so that the work piece functions as an anode. Other approaches include electroplating the object with a layer of the principal metal of the alloy, as well as, for sterling and similar grades of silver, depletion silvering the piece, and for gold-copper alloys, a sodium dichromate pickle solution with a low percentage of sulfuric acid has been occasionally found effective. These approaches, however, are temporary fixes in that all they do is cover up the firestain: over time, it will almost always reemerge through the thin layer of overlying metal deposit. The only long-term techniques to prevent the appearance of firestain are through its time-consuming physical removal or preventing its formation in the first place, by using an oxygen-free environment (which is often expensive and requires specialized equipment), or by using an alloy which is resistant to firestain such as argentium.

== See also ==
- Mill scale
