= Weighted sterling =

Silver object weighted with other material

Weighted sterling or weighted silver refers to items such as candlesticks, candy dishes, salt and pepper shakers, and trophies that have a heavy thick weighted foot or pedestal base, in order to keep them steady and not easy to topple over. Wax, plaster, copper, or lead is used in the base to give the item strength, stability, and heft. Manufacturers of such weighted items are required by law to label them as “Weighted Sterling Silver” to ensure unwary consumers are not misled into believing the items are solely sterling silver, because solid sterling objects have value by weight.
