= Sauce =

Liquid, cream, or semi-solid food served on or used in preparing other foods

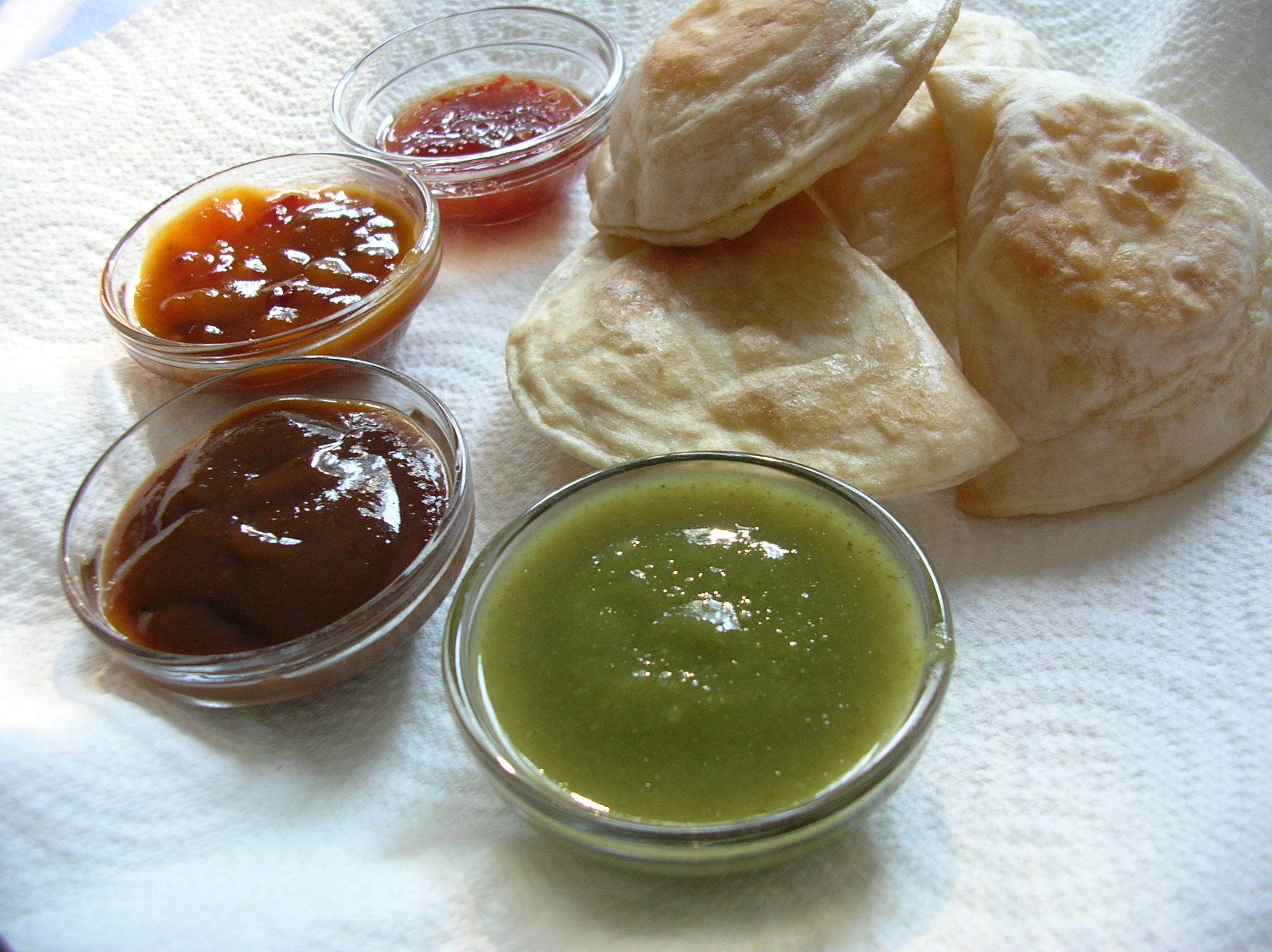
Samosas accompanied by four sauces

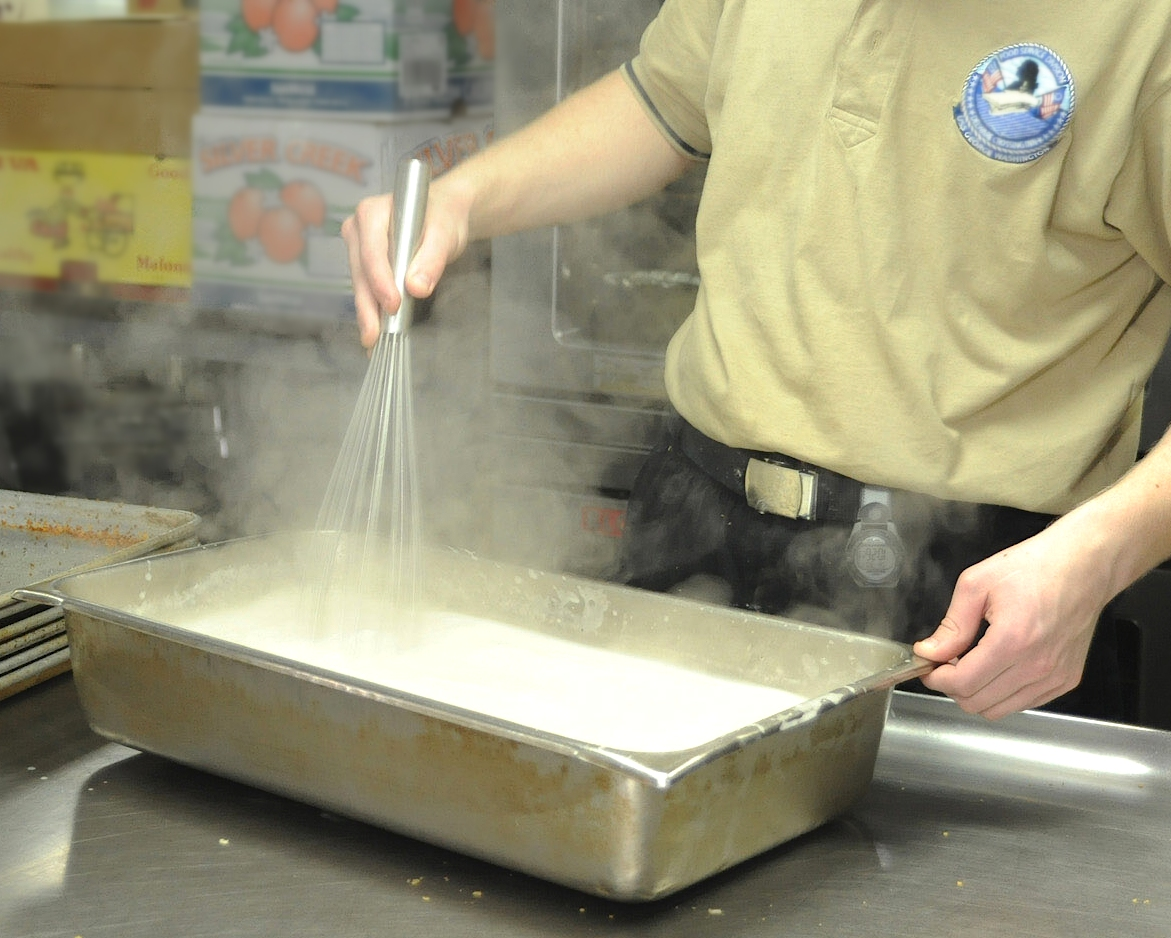
A chef whisking a sauce

In cooking, a sauce is a liquid, cream, or semi-solid food, served on or used in preparing other foods. Most sauces are not normally consumed by themselves; they add flavour, texture, and visual appeal to a dish. Sauce is a French word probably from the post-classical Latin salsa, derived from the classical salsus 'salted'. Possibly the oldest recorded European sauce is garum, the fish sauce used by the Ancient Romans, while doubanjiang, the Chinese soy bean paste, is mentioned in Rites of Zhou 20.

Sauces are an essential element in cuisines all over the world, and may be used for sweet or savory dishes. They may be prepared and served cold, like mayonnaise, prepared cold but served lukewarm like pesto, cooked and served warm like bechamel or cooked and served cold, like apple sauce. They may be freshly prepared by the cook, especially in restaurants, but today many sauces are sold premade and packaged like Worcestershire sauce, HP Sauce, soy sauce or ketchup. Sauces for salad are called salad dressing. Sauces in Chinese and Indian cuisine are made for curries.

A chef who specializes in making sauces is called a saucier.

== Function ==
Sauces are used as accompaniments to improve the flavor of a dish. They may do this by deepening the flavor already present in ingredients or by providing pleasing complementary or contrasting flavors. Cultures around the world employ other accompaniments to the same effect, for instance relishes and stews, the latter seen in the Ethiopian wat accompanying injera flatbreads.

Cooking and then serving a sauce with a dish (a composed sauce) is predominantly a Western, particularly French, concept. With the exception of pasta, sauces in western cooking generally accompany meats and other proteins that have been subject to a simple cooking process such as frying. In Asia, sauces are integrated into the dish, seen in curries, or are used as a condiment, as in fish sauce.

== History ==
The Latin salsus (salted) is the root etymology of sauce.

One of the oldest sauces is thought to be hot sauce, created by Aztecs in roughly 7000 BCE by mixing chili peppers with water. Other early sauces include jiang, Chinese pastes made from fermented meat, fish, grains or beans, documented in the 3rd century BCE; and garum, a mixture dating back to ancient Greece made from fermented anchovies or sardines and salt.

== Composed sauces ==
Composed sauces are made in the kitchen, and are particularly important in classical French cuisine. Such sauces may be uncooked mixtures, for instance pesto and skordalia, or cooked, seen in Hollandaise and white sauces. They always contain basic seasonings, and in more intricate preparations include condiments and an intensified element of the ingredient being accompanied (for example, a sauce accompanying a steak incorporating meat juices released during cooking). A sauce made from the last is known as an integral sauce. Several basic cooked preparations, such as stocks, demi-glace and espagnole sauce may be preprepared and included in cooked sauces; these often are attempts to resemble a sauce made from an intensified element of the accompanied ingredient.

== Sweet sauces ==
Sauces are served hot and cold in several desserts. As with savory sauces, sweet sauces are used to intensify the flavors they accompany, but they also are used to generate various contrasting elements: a tart lemon sauce is frequently paired with a sweet white chocolate mousse, smooth sauces often provide textual contrast with crunchy pastry, and in hot fudge sundaes, a warm sauce functions as a counterpoint to the chilled ice cream.

== Cuisines ==
=== American ===
Sauces popular in America include prepared cold condiments like ketchup, mustard, mayonnaise, tartar sauce, cocktail sauce, various hot (spicy) sauces, and a variety of salad dressings, often used for dishes other than salad. Barbecue sauce is used both as a condiment and as an ingredient in some varieties of barbecue.

Hot sauces include gravy, and tomato sauce, often served with pasta. White (béchamel) sauce is widely used as an ingredient.

Dessert sauces include fudge sauce, butterscotch sauce, hard sauce (which is not liquid), and many others.

=== British ===
In traditional British cuisine, gravy is a sauce used on roast dinner. The sole survivor of the medieval bread-thickened sauces, bread sauce is one of the oldest sauces in British cooking. Apple sauce, mint sauce and horseradish sauce are used on meat (usually on pork, lamb and beef respectively). Redcurrant jelly, mint jelly, and white sauce may also be used. Salad cream is sometimes used on salads. Tomato ketchup and brown sauce are used on fast-food-type dishes. Mushroom ketchup and strong English mustard are also used on various foods, as is Worcestershire sauce. Custard is a popular dessert sauce. Other popular sauces include Marie Rose sauce (as used in a prawn cocktail), whisky sauce (for serving with haggis), Albert sauce (horseradish sauce to enhance flavour of braised beef) and cheddar sauce (as used in cauliflower or macaroni and cheese). In contemporary British cuisine, owing to the wide diversity of British society today, there are also many sauces that are of British origin but based upon the cuisine of other countries, particularly former colonies such as India.

=== Caucasian ===
- Ajika is a spicy hot sauce originating in Abkhazia, widely used in Georgian cuisine and found also in parts of Russia, Armenia, and Georgia.
- Ships (sauce) is a traditional sauce of Circassian cuisine, made on a base of meat broth with pounded garlic, pepper, and sour milk or cream.
- Tkemali is a tart and savoury traditional Georgian sauce of cherry plums in combination with various spices, including garlic, pennyroyal, coriander, dill, and chili.

=== Chinese ===
There are many varied cuisines in China, but many of them compose dishes from sauces including different kinds of soy sauce, fermented bean paste including doubanjiang, chili sauces, oyster sauce, and also many oils and vinegar preparations. These ingredients are used to build up a range of different sauces and condiments used before, during, or after cooking the main ingredients for a dish:

- Braising sauces or marinades (卤水)
- Cooking sauces (调味)
- Dipping sauces (蘸水)

In some Chinese cuisines, such as Cantonese, dishes are often thickened with a slurry of cornstarch or potato starch and water.

=== Filipino ===
Filipino cuisine typically uses "toyomansi" (soy sauce with kalamansi lime) as well as different varieties of suka, patis, bagoong and banana ketchup, among others.

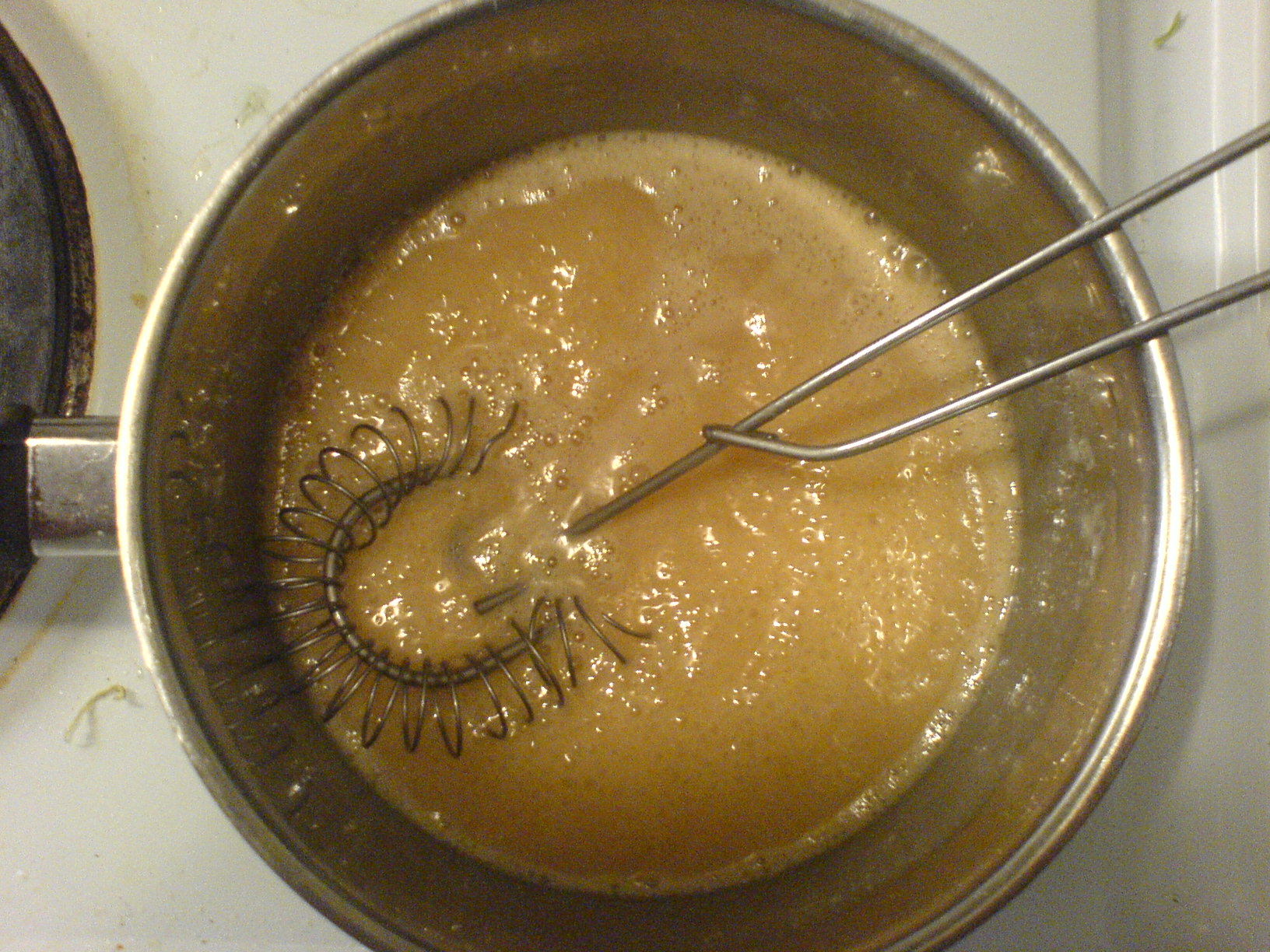
Caramel sauce

=== French ===
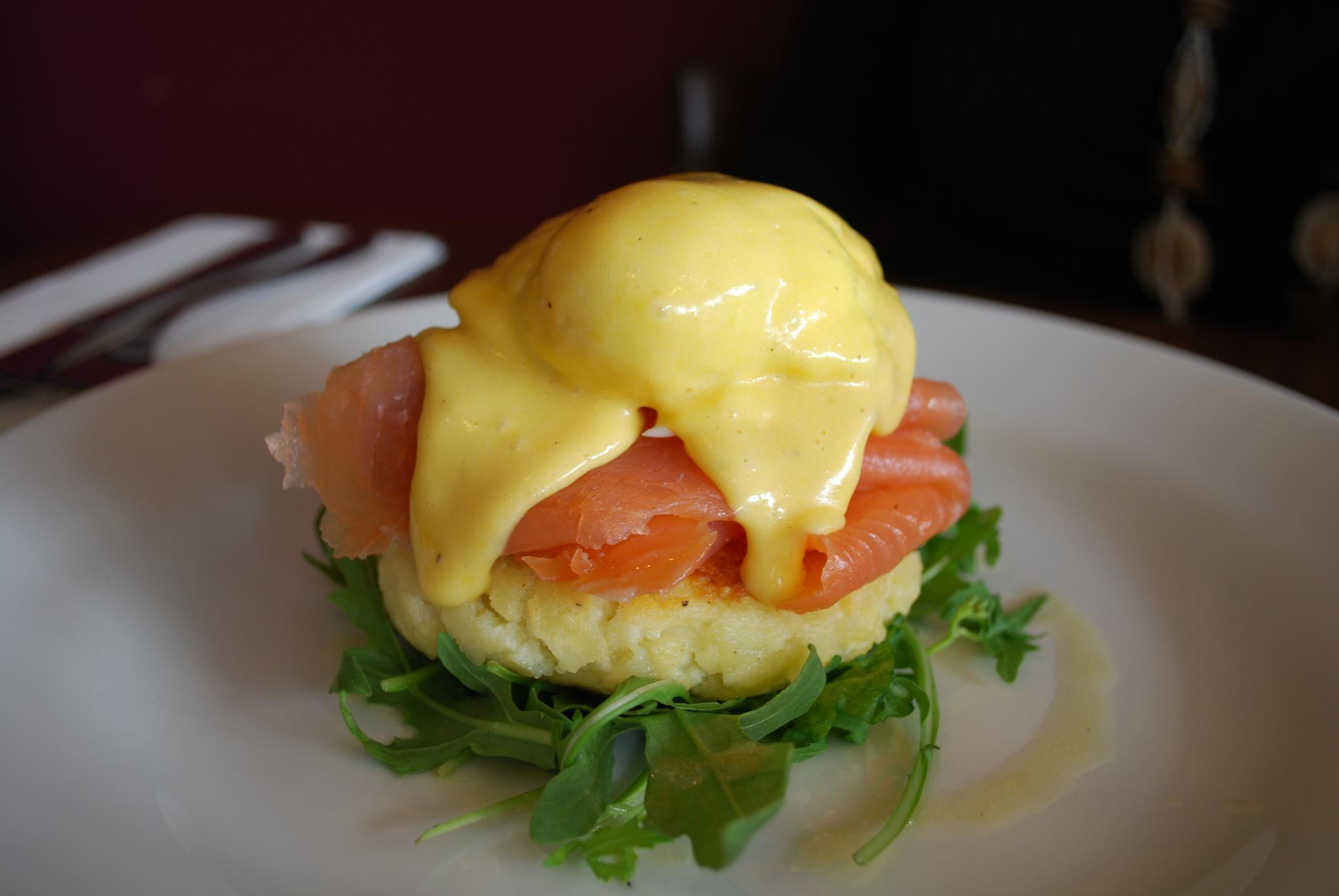
Hollandaise sauce atop a salmon Eggs Benedict

Sauces in French cuisine date back to the Middle Ages. There were many hundreds of sauces in the culinary repertoire. In cuisine classique (roughly from the end of the 19th century until the advent of nouvelle cuisine in the 1980s), sauces were a major defining characteristic of French cuisine.

In the early 19th century, the chef Marie-Antoine Carême created an extensive list of sauces, many of which were original recipes. It is unknown how many sauces Carême is responsible for, but it is estimated to be in the hundreds. Many are included in his Art de la cuisine française au XIXe siècle.

Carême considered the four grandes sauces to be espagnole, velouté, allemande, and béchamel, from which a large variety of petites sauces could be composed.

In the early 20th century, the chef Auguste Escoffier refined Carême's list of basic sauces in his classic Guide culinaire. Its 4th and last edition listed the foundation or basic sauces as espagnole, velouté, béchamel, and tomate. Sauce allemande, which is a variant of velouté made with egg yolks, is replaced by sauce tomate. Another basic sauce mentioned in the Guide culinaire is sauce mayonnaise, which Escoffier wrote was a mother sauce akin to the espagnole and velouté due to its many derivative sauces.

In A Guide to Modern Cookery, an English abridged translation of Escoffier's 1903 edition of Le guide culinaire, hollandaise was included in the list of basic sauces, which made for a list that is identical to the list of five fundamental "French mother sauces" that is acknowledged by a variety of sources:

- Sauce espagnole, a fortified brown veal stock sauce, thickened with a brown roux
- Sauce velouté, a light stock-based sauce, thickened with a roux or a liaison, a mixture of egg yolks and cream.
- Sauce béchamel, a milk-based sauce, thickened with a roux of flour and butter.
- Sauce tomate, a tomato-based sauce.
- Sauce hollandaise, warm butter and lemon (or vinegar) emulsified using egg yolk.

A sauce which is derived from one of the mother sauces by augmenting with additional ingredients is sometimes called a "daughter sauce" or "secondary sauce". Most sauces commonly used in classical cuisine are daughter sauces. For example, béchamel can be made into Mornay by the addition of grated cheese, and espagnole becomes bordelaise with the addition of reduction of red wine, shallots, and poached beef marrow.

A specialized implement, the French sauce spoon, was introduced in the mid-20th century to aid in eating sauce in French cuisine, is enjoying increasing popularity at high-end restaurants.

=== Indian ===
Indian cuisines use sauces such as tomato-based sauces with varying spice combinations such as tamarind sauce, coconut milk-/paste-based sauces, and chutneys. There are substantial regional variations in Indian cuisine, but many sauces use a seasoned mix of onion, ginger and garlic paste as the base of various gravies and sauces. Various cooking oils, ghee and/or cream are also regular ingredients in Indian sauces.

=== Indonesian ===
Indonesian cuisine uses typical sauces such as kecap manis (sweet soy sauce), bumbu kacang (peanut sauce) and tauco, while popular hot and spicy sauces are sambal, colo-colo, dabu-dabu and rica-rica. Sambal is an umbrella term; there are many kinds of sambal.

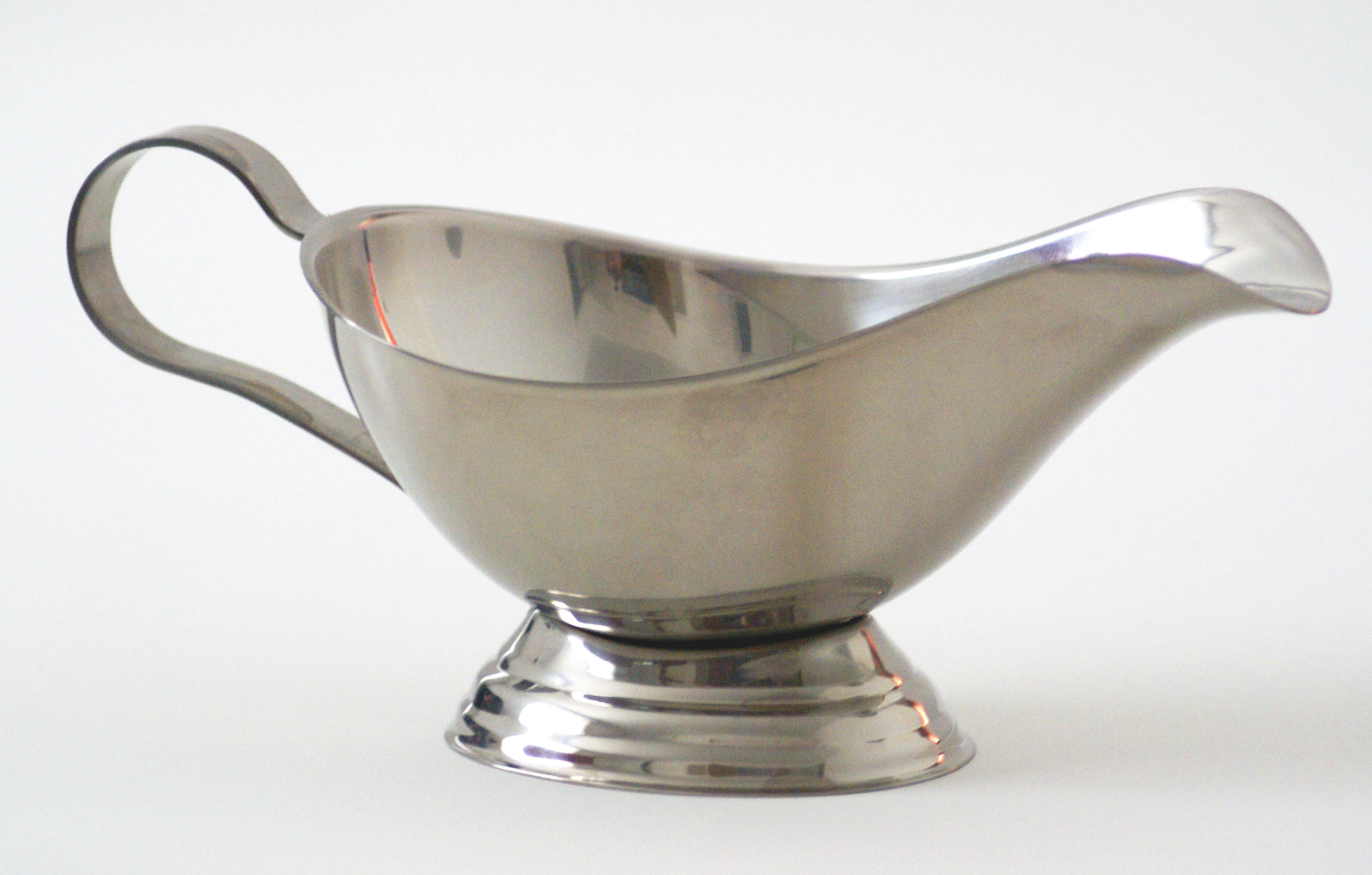
In the European traditions, sauces are often served in a sauce boat.

=== Italian ===
Italian sauces reflect the rich variety of the Italian cuisine and can be divided in several categories including:

==== Savory ====
===== For meats, fish and vegetables =====
Examples are:

- Besciamella from Tuscany and Emilia-Romagna
- Bagna càuda from Piedmont
- Salmoriglio from Sicily
- Gremolata from Milan
- Salsa verde from Emilia-Romagna and Tuscany

===== For pasta =====
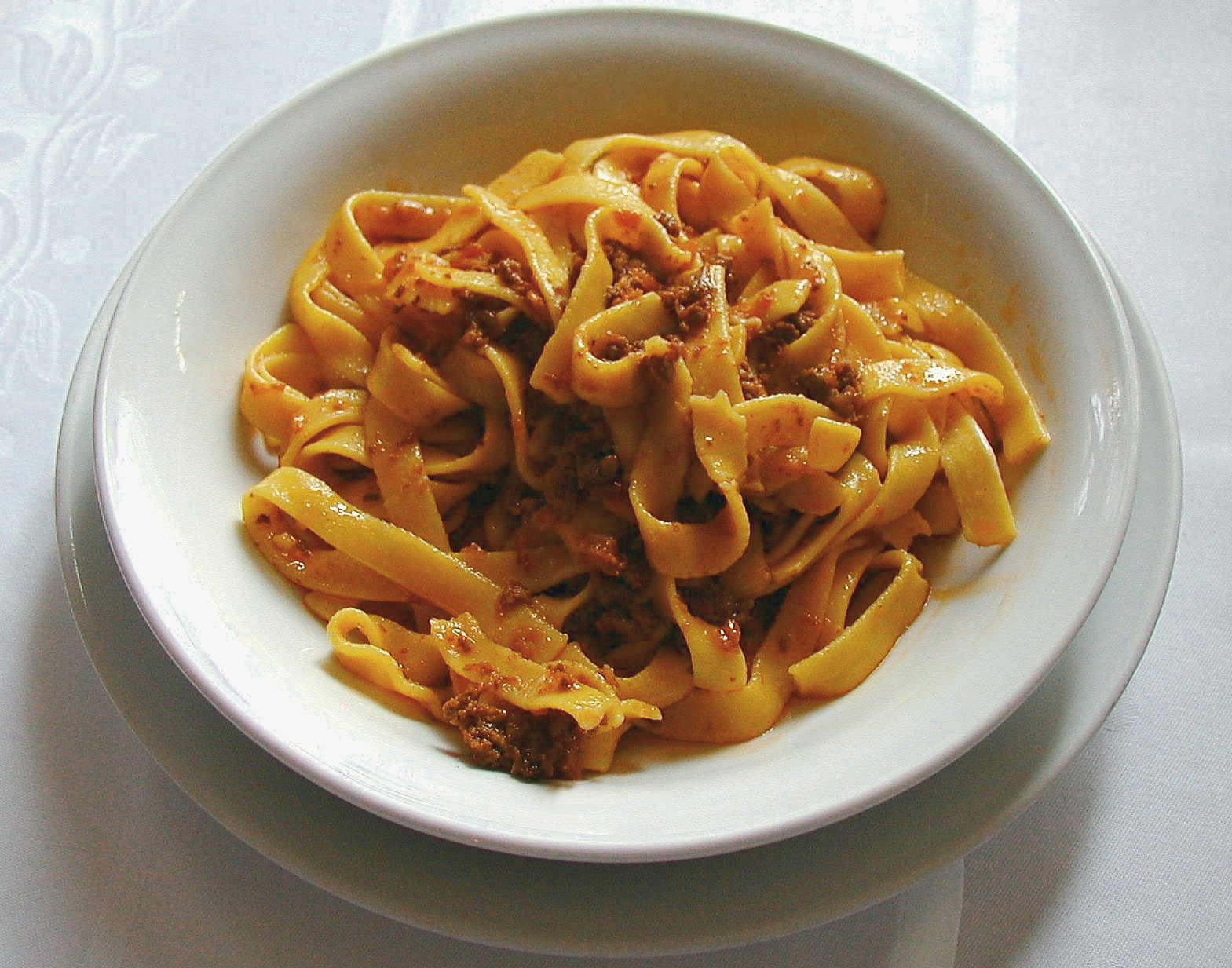
Tagliatelle al Ragù alla Bolognese

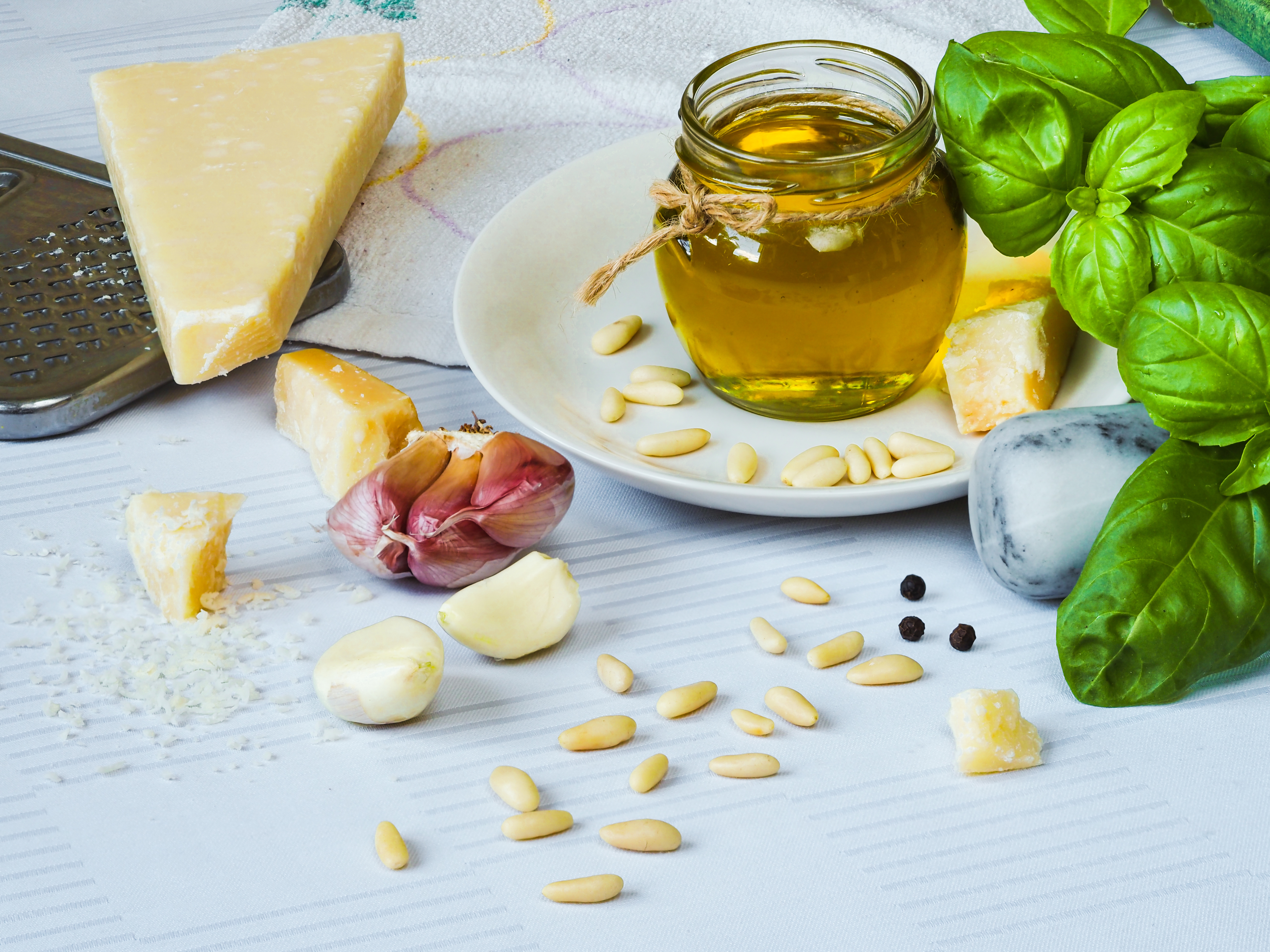
Ingridients for ″Pesto Genovese″

There are thousands of such sauces, and many towns have traditional sauces. Among the internationally well-known are:

- Ragù alla Bolognese from Bologna
- Pesto from Genoa
- Carbonara and amatriciana from Lazio
- Ragù alla Napoletana from Campania

==== Dessert ====
- Zabaione from Piedmont
- Crema pasticciera made with eggs and milk and common in the whole peninsula
- "Crema al mascarpone" used to make Tiramisù and to dress panettone at Christmas and common in the North of the country.

=== Japanese ===
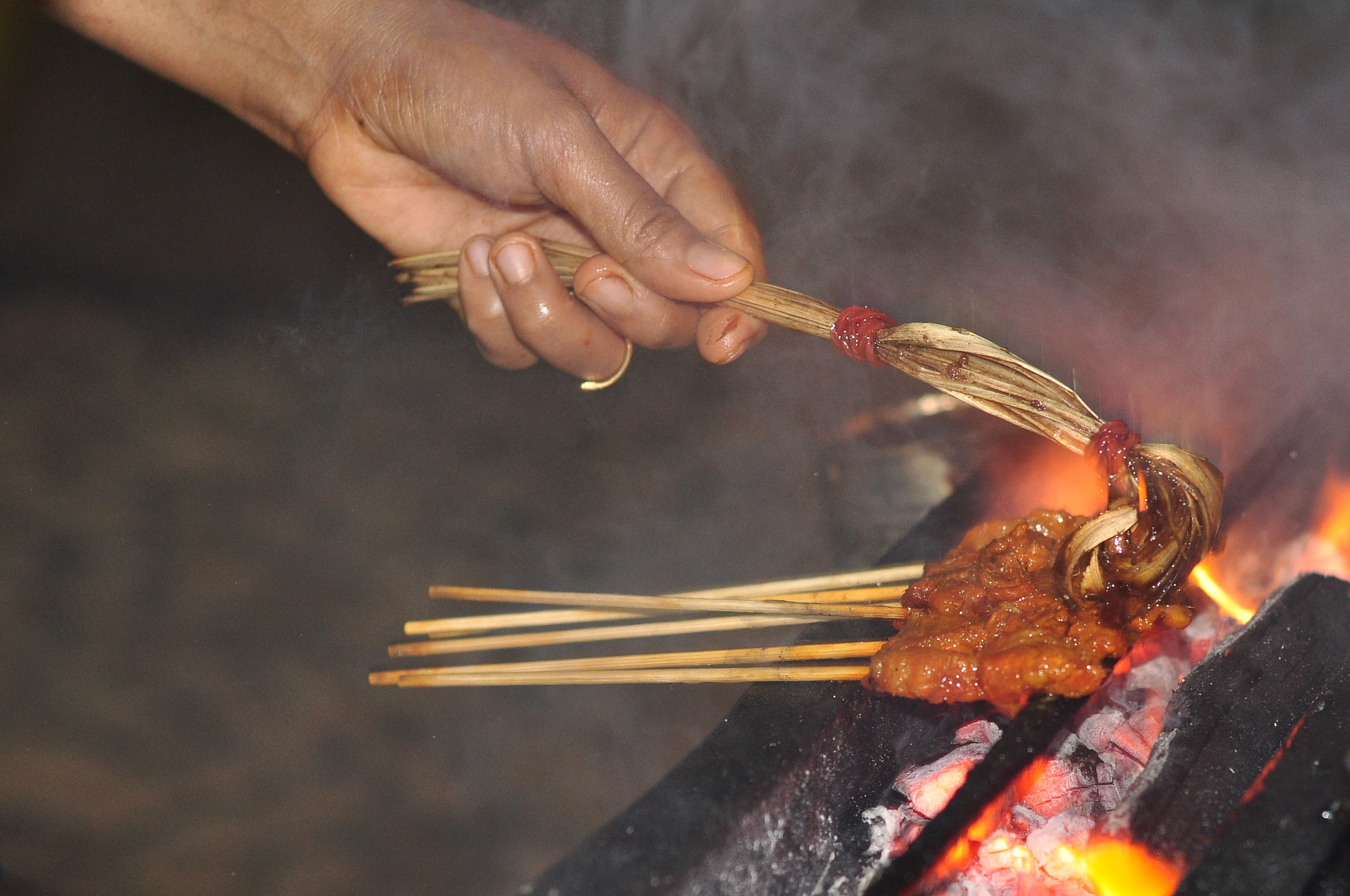
Sauce being brushed on satay in the hawker food court at Tanjung Aru beach, Sabah, Borneo, Malaysia

Sauces used in traditional Japanese cuisine are usually based on shōyu (soy sauce), miso or dashi. Ponzu, citrus-flavoured soy sauce, and yakitori no tare, sweetened rich soy sauce, are examples of shōyu-based sauces. Miso-based sauces include gomamiso, miso with ground sesame, and amamiso, sweetened miso. In modern Japanese cuisine, the word "sauce" often refers to Worcestershire sauce, introduced in the 19th century and modified to suit Japanese tastes. Tonkatsu, okonomiyaki, and yakisoba sauces are based on this sauce.

=== Korean ===
Korean cuisine uses sauces such as doenjang, gochujang, samjang, aekjeot, and soy sauce.

=== Latin and Spanish American ===
Salsas ("sauces" in Spanish) such as pico de gallo (tomato, onion and chili chopped with lemon juice), salsa cocida, salsa verde, chile, and salsa roja are an important part of many Latin and Spanish-American cuisines in the Americas. Typical ingredients include chili, tomato, onion, and spices; thicker sauces often contain avocado.

Mexican cuisine includes sauces which may contain chocolate, seeds, and chiles collectively known by the Nahua name mole (compare guacamole).

In Argentinian and Uruguayan cuisine, chimichurri is an uncooked sauce used in cooking and as a table condiment for grilled meat.

Peruvian cuisine uses sauces based mostly in different varieties of ají combined with several ingredients, most notably salsa huancaína based on fresh cheese and salsa de ocopa based on peanuts or nuts.

=== Middle Eastern ===
- Fesenjān is a traditional Iranian sauce of pomegranates and walnuts served over meat and/or vegetables which was traditionally served for Yalda or end of winter and the Nowruz ceremony.
- Hummus is a traditional middle eastern sauce or dip. It originated in Egypt, but is considered as a traditional food of many Arab countries such as Syria and Palestine. It is made of chickpeas and tahina (sesame paste) and garlic with olive oil, salt and lemon juice.

=== Thai ===
- Southeast Asian cuisines, such as Thai and Vietnamese cuisine, often use fish sauce, made from fermented fish.

== Examples ==
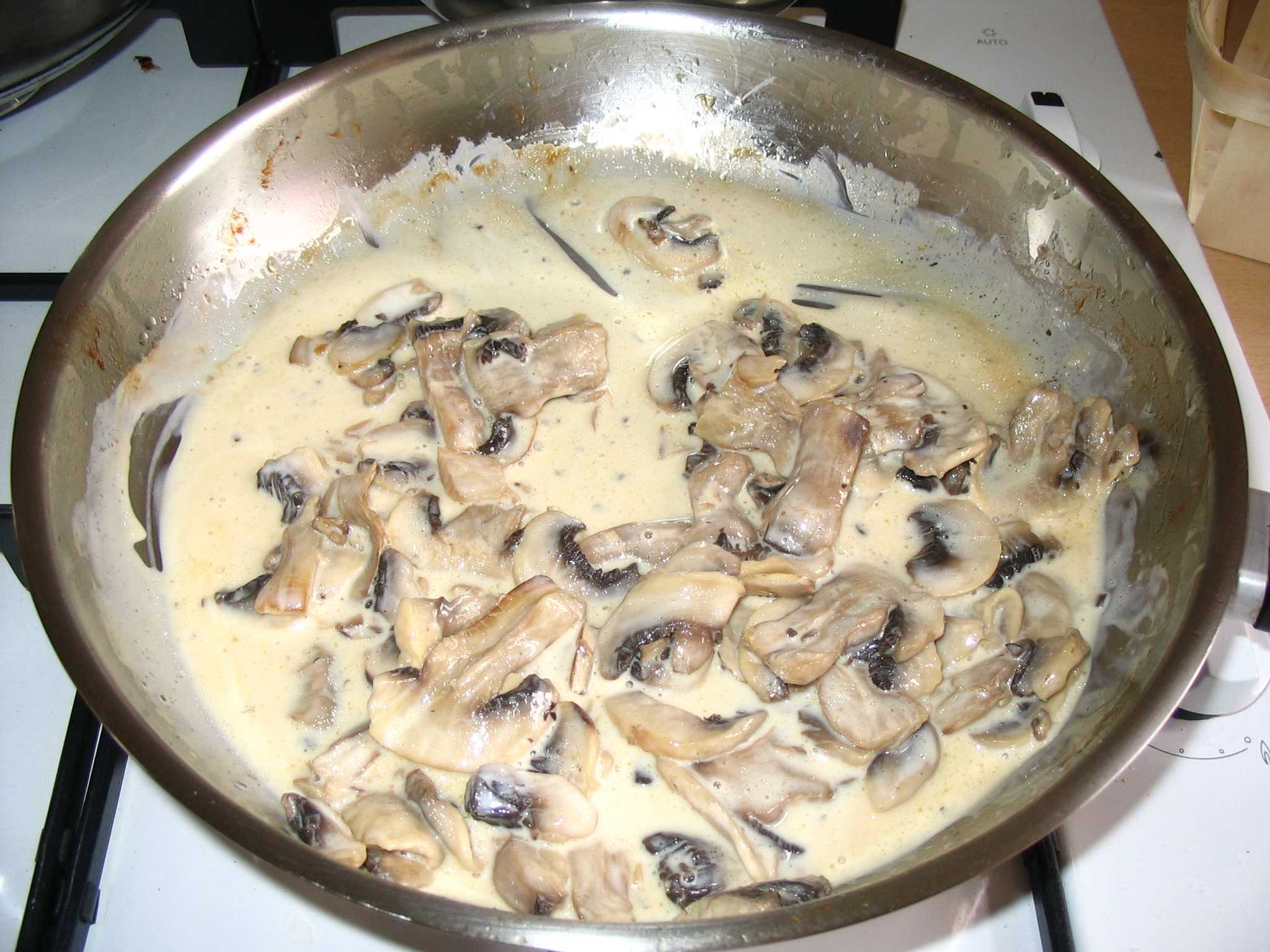
Mushroom sauce

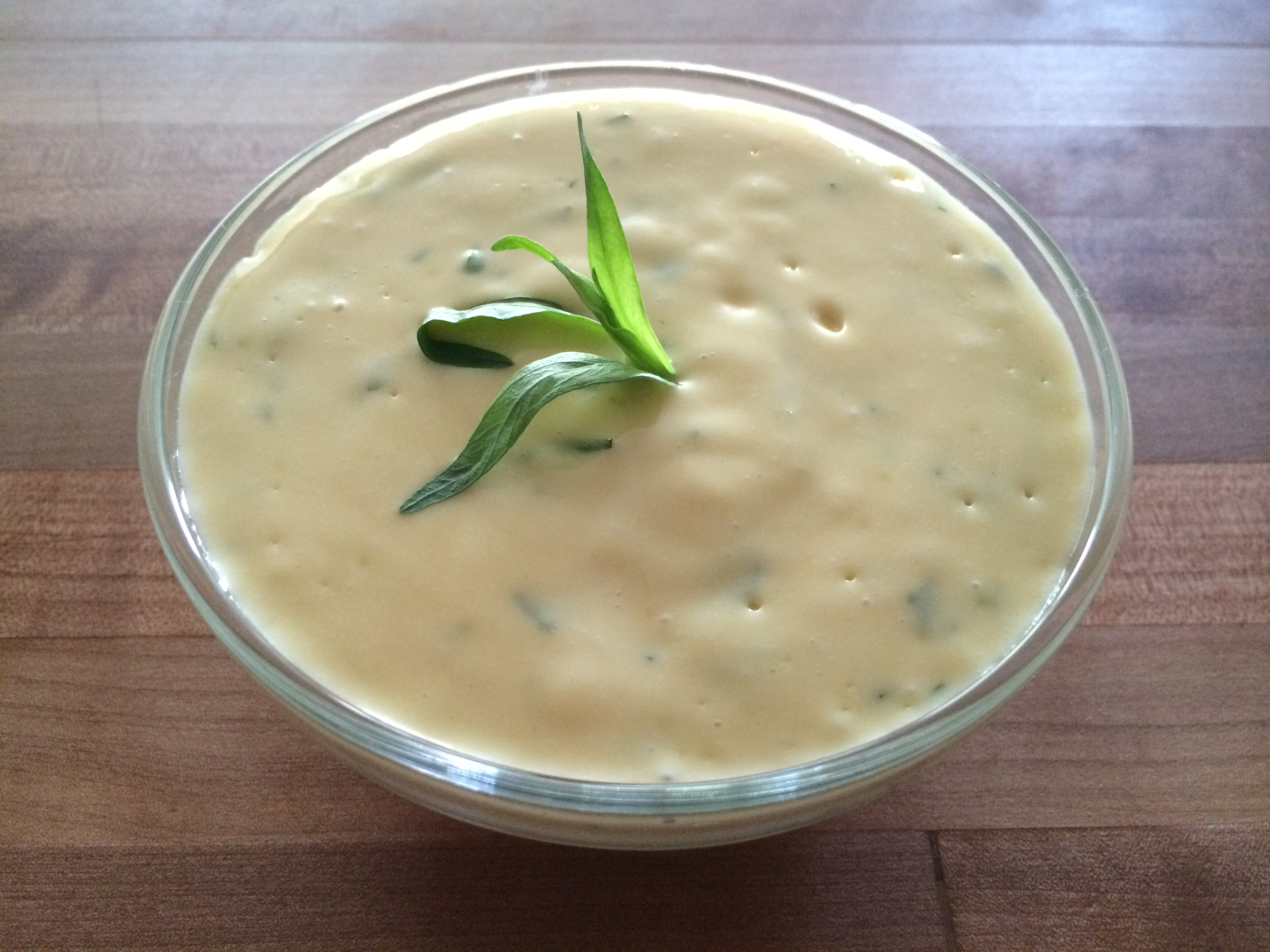
Sauce béarnaise or Béarnaise sauce.

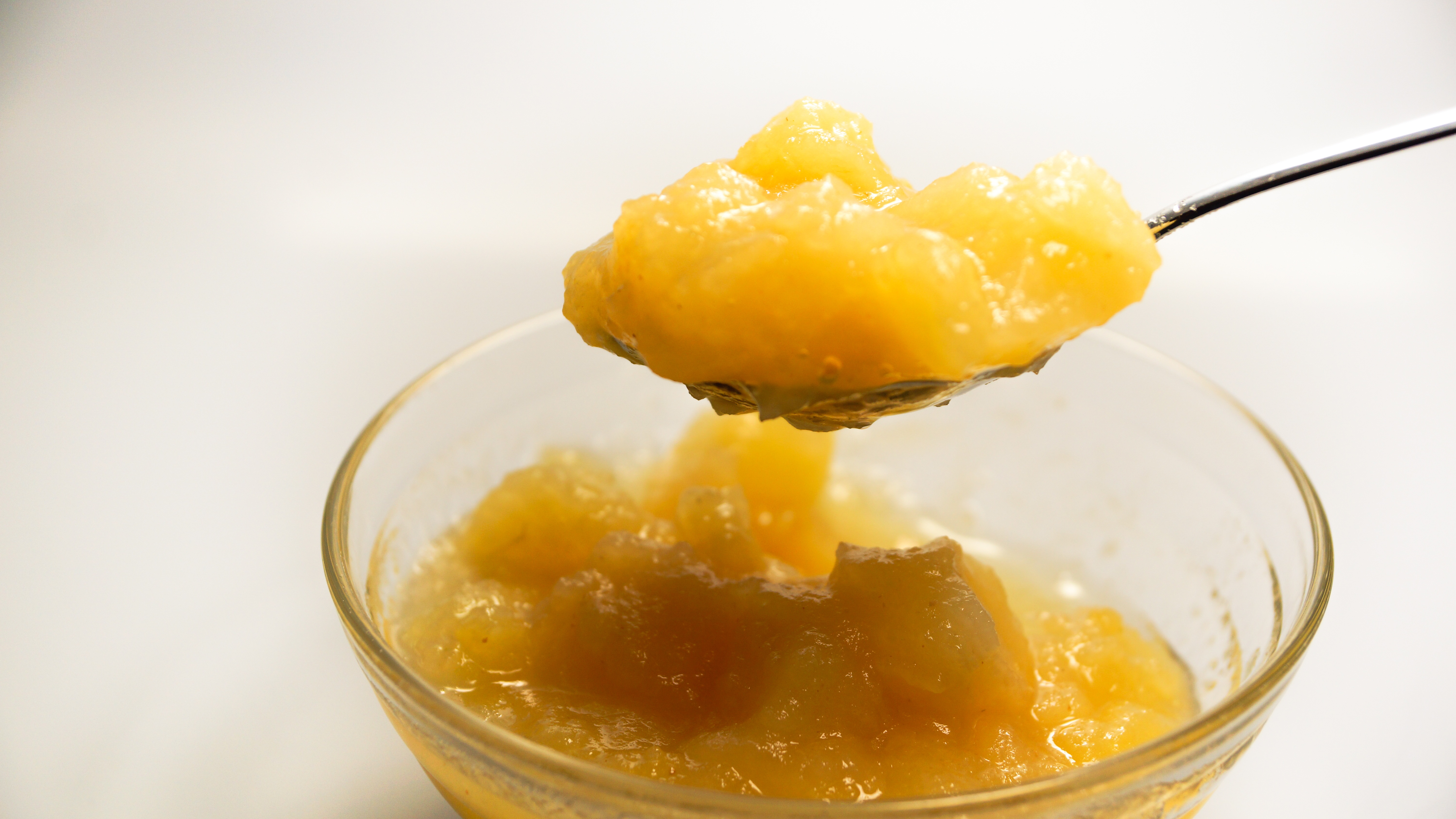
Apple sauce

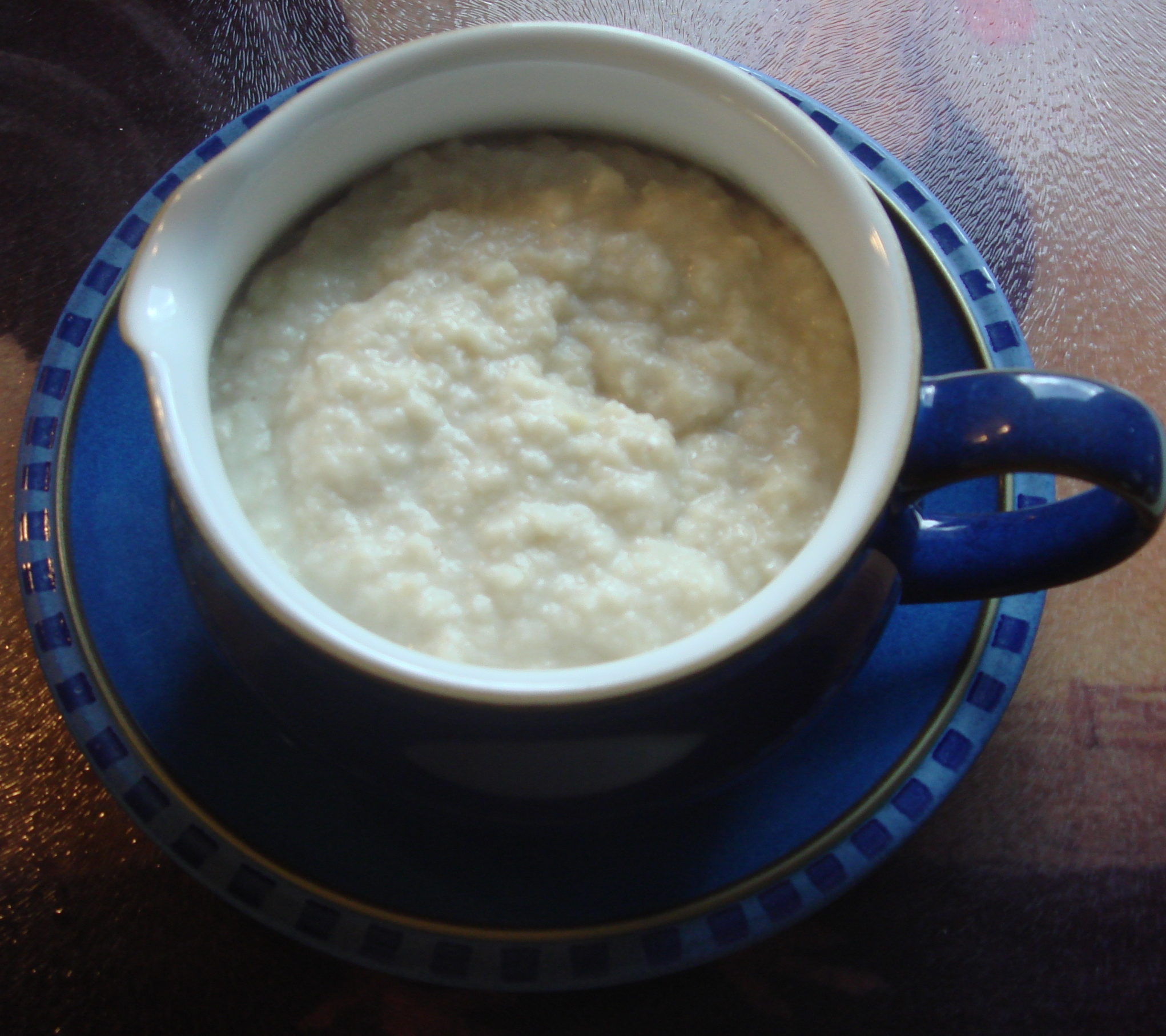
Bread sauce

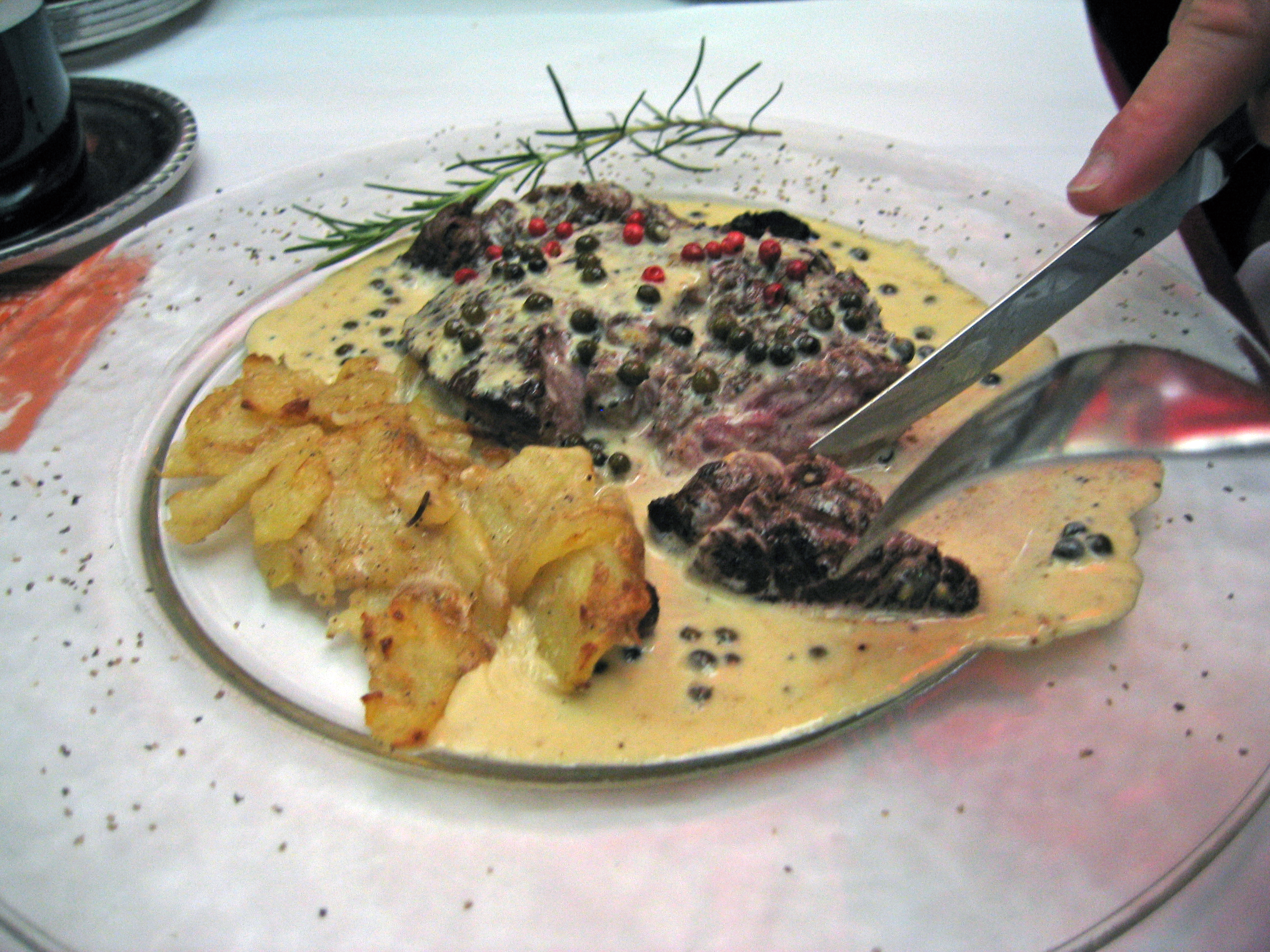
A beef steak served with peppercorn sauce

== See also ==
- Pickle
- Chutney
- Coulis
- Dip
  - List of dips
- Gastrique
- Instant sauce
- List of foods
- List of condiments
- List of sauces
  - List of dessert sauces
- Salad dressing
- Salsa
- Sambal
- Saucery
- Sofrito
