= Bonbon spoon =

Kind of spoon

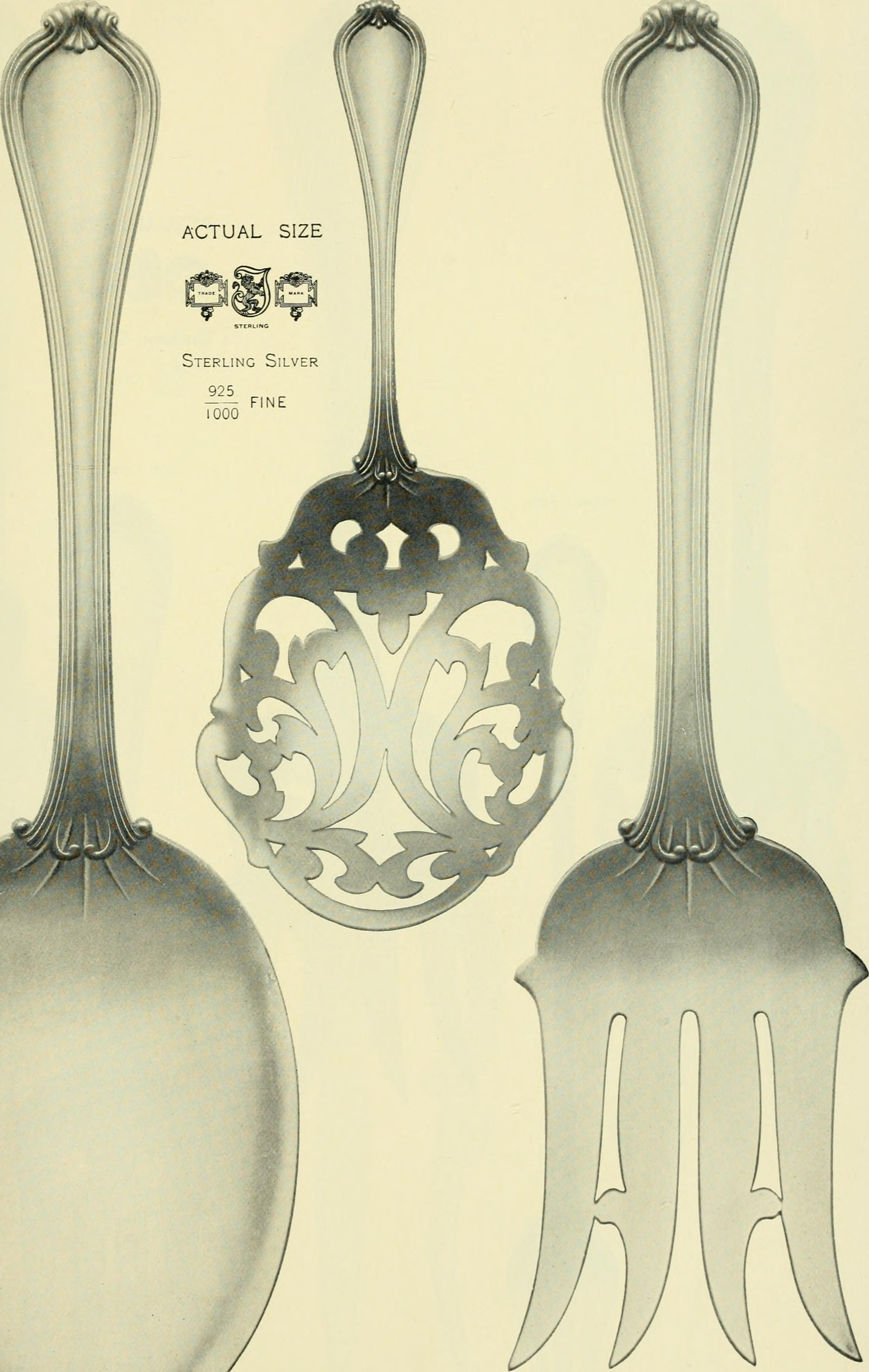
Bonbon spoon (centered object, to scale)

Bonbon spoons are specialized serving utensils designed for serving bonbons, nuts, and various other sweet treats. Bonbon spoons allow chocolate to be handled without touching it with the fingers. The majority of bonbon spoons feature a bowl with piercing and intricate designs. Certain ones were personalized with monograms, to be made as unique gifts.

== History ==
Historically, bonbon spoons made of silver were more popular mostly because of its aesthetic appeal, malleability, and status as a precious metal. Silver bonbon spoons were especially used by middle class households. Other metals that were used for bonbon spoons in affluent households included brass, pewter, or gold for the most extravagant settings. In less affluent households, bonbon spoons could be made from materials such as wood, ceramic, or glass.

== Use ==
Bonbon spoons were used in dining settings to display wealth and sophistication. One of its primary uses was to serve sweets and confections to guests and they were designed to be passed around from person to person on the dinner table. During the late Victorian era, known American silversmiths like Tiffany & Co. and Gorham Manufacturing Company were involved in bonbon spoon production.

In contemporary times, bonbon spoons can be found in materials, including silver, stainless steel, and various food-safe plastics. There also exist an interest in collecting Victorian sterling silver bonbon spoons for their high auction value, especially valuable pieces from renowned silver companies.
