= Bar spoon =

Utensil for mixing drinks

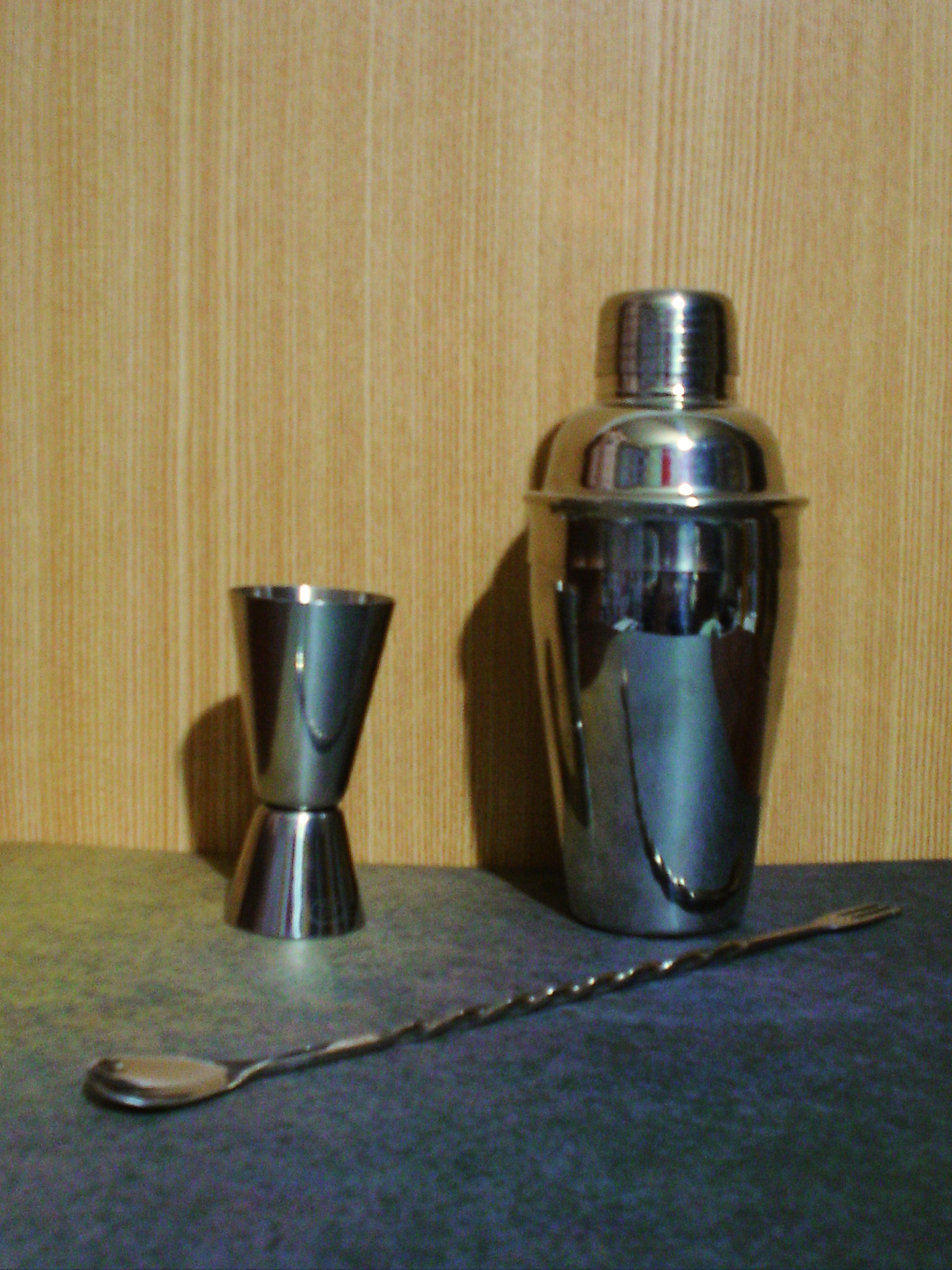
A jigger, a cocktail shaker and a bar spoon

A bar spoon is a long-handled spoon used in bartending for mixing and layering of both alcoholic and non-alcoholic mixed drinks. Its length ensures that it can reach the bottom of the tallest jug or tumbler to mix ingredients directly in the glass.

A bar spoon holds about 5 millilitres of liquid (the same as a conventional teaspoon). Its long handle is similar to an iced tea spoon, but is usually decorative and elegant – some variations mimic large swizzle sticks, with a disc at one end. The shaft is typically thin and threaded so that the fingers can easily grip and rotate the spoon.
