= French sauce spoon =

Spoon meant to eat a sauce

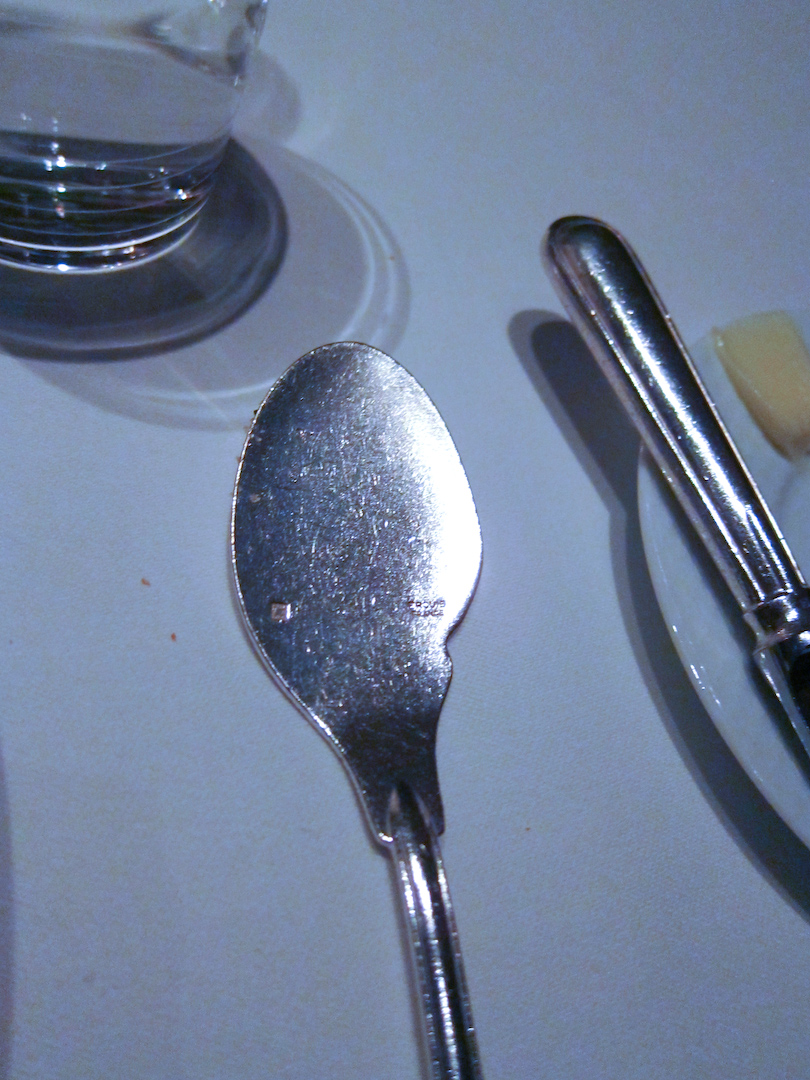
A French sauce spoon

A French sauce spoon or saucier spoon is a spoon that is typically the size and shape of a dessert spoon, but with a flattened bowl that has a thinner edge and a small notch on one side. As the name suggests, a French sauce spoon is used to eat the sauce accompanying a dish. Such a spoon may be referred to simply as a sauce spoon, but this can also refer to a spoon used to serve sauce.

The spoon's flattened bowl and thin edge aids scooping a thin layer of sauce from a plate without resorting to tipping the plate; the notch in the bowl is variously claimed to allow oil or fat to drain away from the sauce, or to be a reference to the notch in a fish knife.

Originally invented in France at the restaurant Lasserre in 1950 (chef René Lasserre) as the cuillère à sauce individuelle (individual sauce spoon) and originally found mainly in France, French sauce spoons are increasingly popular in high-end restaurants elsewhere.
