= Spaghetti spoon =

Kind of spoon

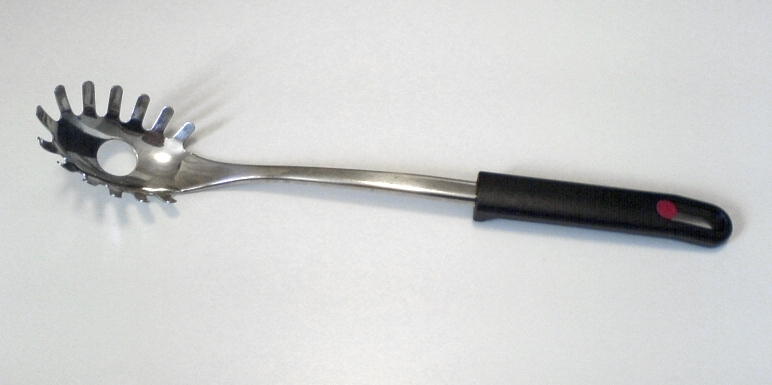

The spaghetti spoon is a specially designed spoon, utilized to make serving and handling spaghetti and other long pasta types easier. It consists of a long stem and a deep, perforated or prong-like end shaped like a scoop, designed to simplify gripping spaghetti for better preparation and presentation.

A spaghetti spoon is utilized for facilitating effortless twirling of pasta within a pot of boiling water and also helps prevent the pasta from slipping off the spoon while serving. The holes in the spoon assists while draining excess water and keeping the hands dry. The holes in the design enables efficient portioning.

Other names for the spaghetti spoon include pasta fork, pasta ladle, pasta spoon, spaghetti server.
