= Britannia silver =

Alloy of silver

Britannia silver is an alloy of silver containing 11 ozt 10 dwt (i.e. 11 1/2 troy ounces) silver in the pound troy, equivalent to 23/24, or 95.833% by weight (mass) silver, the rest usually being copper.

This standard was introduced in England in 1697 by the Standard of Silver Plate, etc. Act 1696 (8 & 9 Will. 3. c. 9) to replace sterling silver (92.5% silver) as the obligatory standard for items of "wrought plate". The lion passant gardant hallmark denoting sterling was replaced with "the figure of a woman commonly called Britannia", and the leopard's head mark of the Worshipful Company of Goldsmiths (in London) replaced with a "lion's head erased".

William III introduced Britannia standard silver as part of the Great Recoinage of 1696, to limit the clipping and melting of sterling silver coinage. A higher standard for wrought plate meant that sterling silver coins could not easily be used as a source of raw material because additional fine silver, which was in short supply at the time, would have to be added to bring the purity of the alloy up to the higher standard.

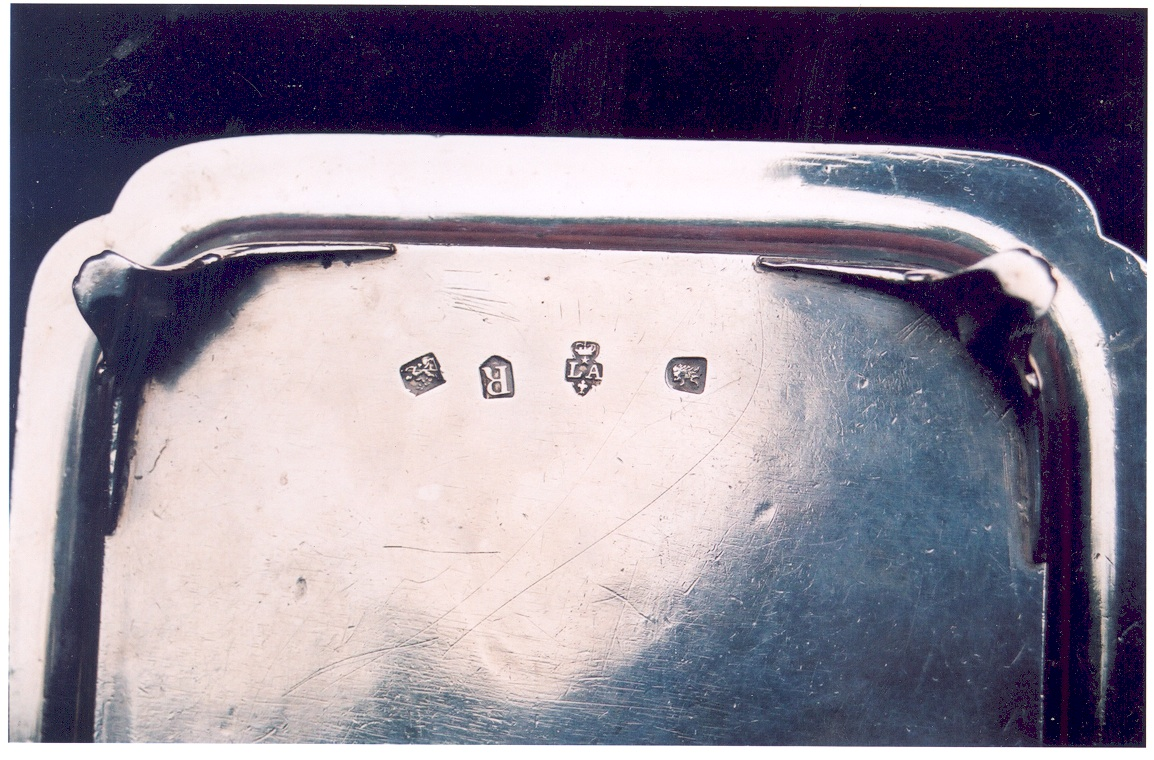
Waiter of 1732, with Britannia gauge mark

Britannia silver is considerably softer than sterling, and after complaints from the trade, sterling silver was again authorised for use by silversmiths from 1 June 1720, and thereafter Britannia silver has remained an optional standard for hallmarking in the United Kingdom and Ireland.

Since the hallmarking changes of 1 January 1999, Britannia silver has been denoted by the millesimal fineness hallmark 958, with the symbol of Britannia being applied optionally.

The silver bullion coins of the Royal Mint issued since 1997, known as "Britannias" for their reverse image, were minted in Britannia standard silver until 2012, when they switched to 999 pure silver.

Britannia silver is distinguishable from Britannia metal, a pewter-like alloy containing no silver.

== See also ==
- Sterling silver

== Bibliography ==
- Forbes, John (1999). Hallmark: A History of the London Assay Office. London: Unicorn Press Ltd. ISBN 9780906290262.
