= Demitasse spoon =

Spoon commonly used for coffee

A demitasse spoon is a diminutive spoon, smaller than a teaspoon. Designed for stirring and serving drinks in demitasse cups, traditionally used to hold strong black coffee such as espresso. It is also used as a baby spoon,. The spoon's bowl is narrower and shallower than a standard teaspoon to fit the cup. They usually measure 3 to 5 inches (7.6 to 12.7cm) in length, which is perfect for the demitasse cup.

Demitasse spoons are usually used after dinner, not with it. However in modern formal place settings, demitasse spoons are usually not present. The dessert utensils are placed in sight to let the diner know that there will be a dessert course and to give them a clue as to its size.If the dessert utensil is just a spoon, the diner can assume that the dessert will require a spoon, like sorbet or ice cream, whereas if the dessert utensil is just a fork, the diner can assume that the dessert will requires a fork, like a pastry or a thin slice of cake. If there is both a spoon and a fork, the diner can assume a bigger dessert and go easier on their dinner to save space for dessert. The demitasse spoon is not shown from the start because it is not needed to inform the diner that there might be coffee at the end. Traditionally, demitasse cups and spoons are only brought out after the diner. The cup set is then offered to diners to ask them if they would like coffee. Later, a second butler would come and fill each cup with coffee, which each guest is then expected to drink or spoon into their mouths.
