= Breakfast cup =

Culinary measurement unit in the United Kingdom

The breakfast cup is a culinary measurement unit in the United Kingdom. It is named after a cup for drinking tea or coffee while eating breakfast. 1 breakfast cup is 8 British imperial fluid ounces.

Five British culinary measurement units are related to the breakfast cup: the tumbler (10 British imperial fluid ounces), the cup (6 British imperial fluid ounces), the teacup (5 British imperial fluid ounces), the coffee cup (2 1/2 British imperial fluid ounces), and the wine glass (2 British imperial fluid ounces).

1 breakfast cup	=	8	British imperial fluid ounces
	=	4/5	tumbler
	=	1 1/3	cups
	=	1 3/5	teacups
	=	3 1/5	coffee cups
	=	4	wine glasses
	=	2/5	British imperial pint
	≈	7.69	US customary fluid ounces
	≈	0.96	US customary cup
	≈	227.3	millilitres
	≈	0.91	metric cup

All six units are the traditional British equivalents of the US customary cup and the metric cup, used in situations where a US cook would use the US customary cup and a cook using metric units the metric cup. The breakfast cup is the most similar in size to the US customary cup and the metric cup. Which of these six units is used depends on the quantity or volume of the ingredient: there is division of labour between these six units, like the tablespoon and the teaspoon. British cookery books and recipes, especially those from the days before the UK's (incomplete) metrication, commonly use two or more of these units simultaneously: for example, the same recipe may call for a 'tumblerful' of one ingredient and a 'wineglassful' of another one; or a 'breakfastcupful' or 'cupful' of one ingredient, a 'teacupful' of a second one, and a 'coffeecupful' of a third one. Unlike the US customary cup and the metric cup, a tumbler, a breakfast cup, a cup, a teacup, a coffee cup, and a wine glass are not measuring cups: they are simply everyday drinking vessels commonly found in British households and typically having the volumes listed above; due to long‑term and widespread use, they have been transformed into measurement units for cooking. There is no British imperial unit–based culinary measuring cup.

== See also ==
- Tumbler (glass)#Culinary measurement unit
- Cup (unit)#British cup
- Teacup (unit)
- Coffee cup (unit)
- Wine glass#Capacity measure
- Cooking weights and measures
