= Sulphide portrait glassware =

Special type of glassware

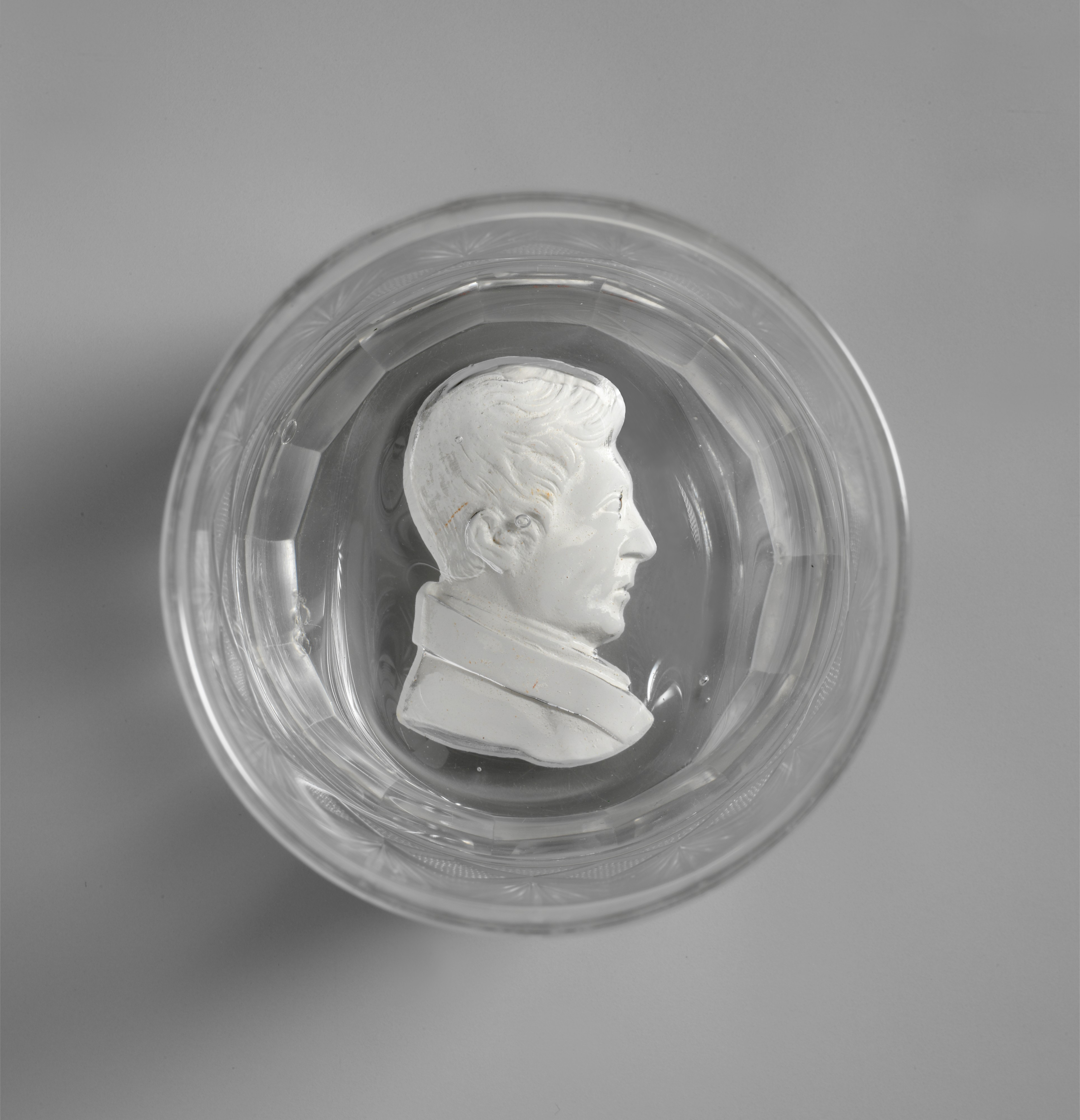
Sulphide portrait of Lafayette in base of glass tumbler by Bakewell, Page & Bakewell Metropolitan Museum of Art

Sulphide portrait glassware is blown, cut, and molded glassware usually made from lead crystal that encases an image. The image appears silver or white, as if made from silver sulphide. Although sulphide is used to describe glass decorated in this manor, the silver or white image is actually a hardened clay paste. Experiments with this glass decorating style began in Europe during the late 18th century, and processes for production were successfully implemented in France and England during the early 19th century. Production in the United States began in the 1820s.

Pittsburgh glass manufacturer Bakewell, Page and Bakewell was the first major manufacturer of sulphide portrait glassware in the United States. During the 1820s, sulphide portrait glassware ornamentation style was known as cameo–incrustation or crystallo ceramie. This type of glassware became popular again during the middle of the 19th century. Bakewell, Page and Bakewell used an unusual style for their sulphide portrait tumblers. The portrait was at the bottom of the tumbler, while the sides of the ware featured engravings. The men portrayed in these tumblers were famous historical figures, such as Marquis de Lafayette, George Washington, and Benjamin Franklin. Also portrayed were then current politicians that were champions of causes that favored the domestic glass producing industry, such as Andrew Jackson and DeWitt Clinton.

== Background ==
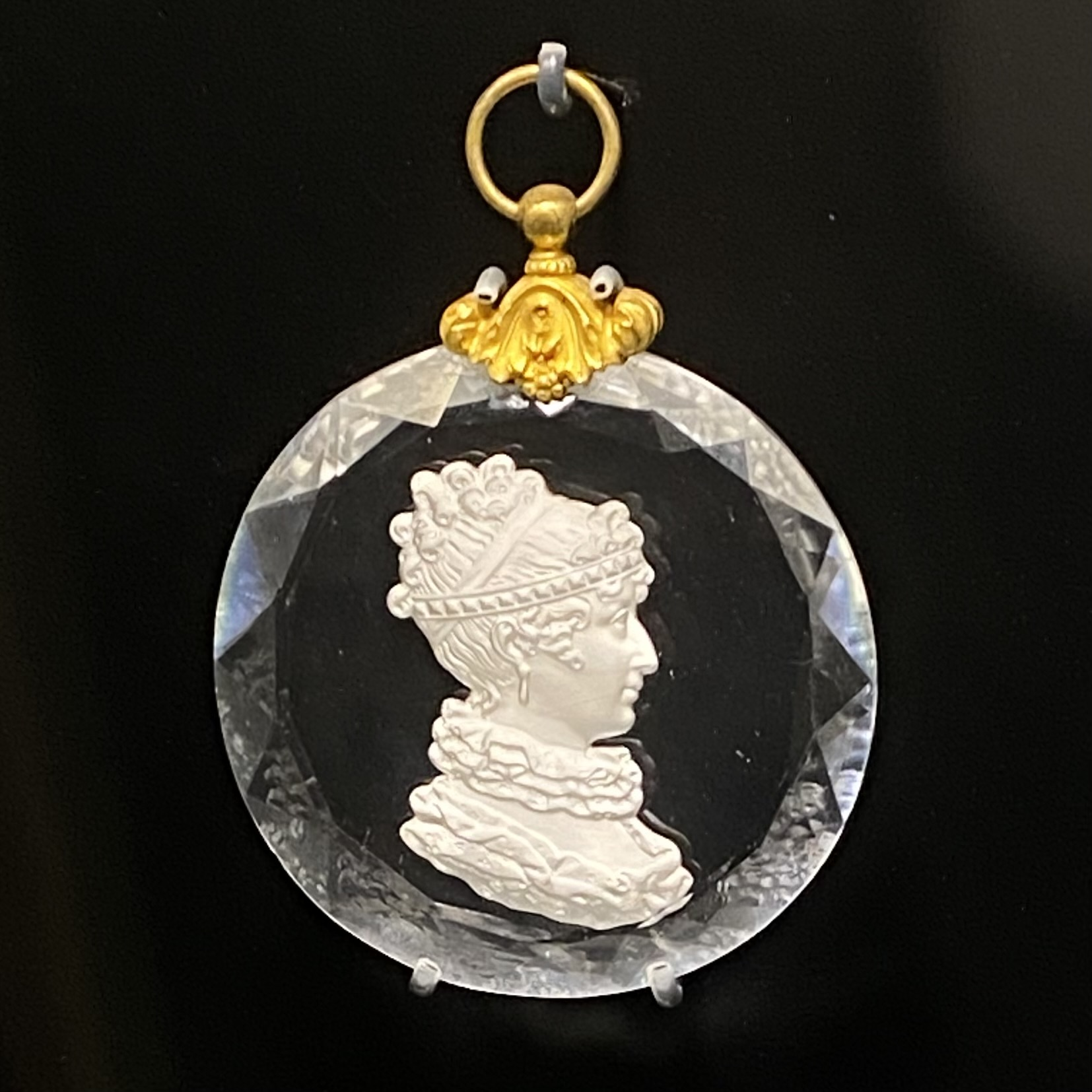
French–made sulphide portrait glass medallion

In the glass industry, a sulphide is a glass object that contains an image encased in the glass that appears as white porcelain. These images can also appear to be silver. Inserting the object, or cameo, into the glass was the most difficult part of the production process. There could be no air bubbles between the cameo and the glass. The cameo needed to be white, which could give it a silvery appearance when viewed through the glass. Historians at the end of the 19th century speculated that the silvery objects encased in glass were made of silver sulphide, although the objects were actually made of a clay paste. The name "sulphide", although not correct, has continued to be the term used to describe glass decorated using this method.

Glassmakers in Bohemia are thought to have unsuccessfully experimented with sulphide production during the late 18th century. This may have occurred as early as 1750, although one source uses "about 1780". No examples of the Bohemian experimentation have been found that date before 1798. In the early 19th century, a French medallion maker began encasing his product in glass, and a similar product was made in England at about the same time. Sulphide portrait glassware was most popular between 1815 and 1830. At the time, the objects were described as cameo–incrustation or crystallo ceramie. During the first 30 years of the 19th century, French sulphides were typically exported to Germany and Austria, while the majority of sulphide portrait glassware found in America or England was manufactured in England. Lower quality imitations caused a decline in popularity.

== Early production in Europe ==
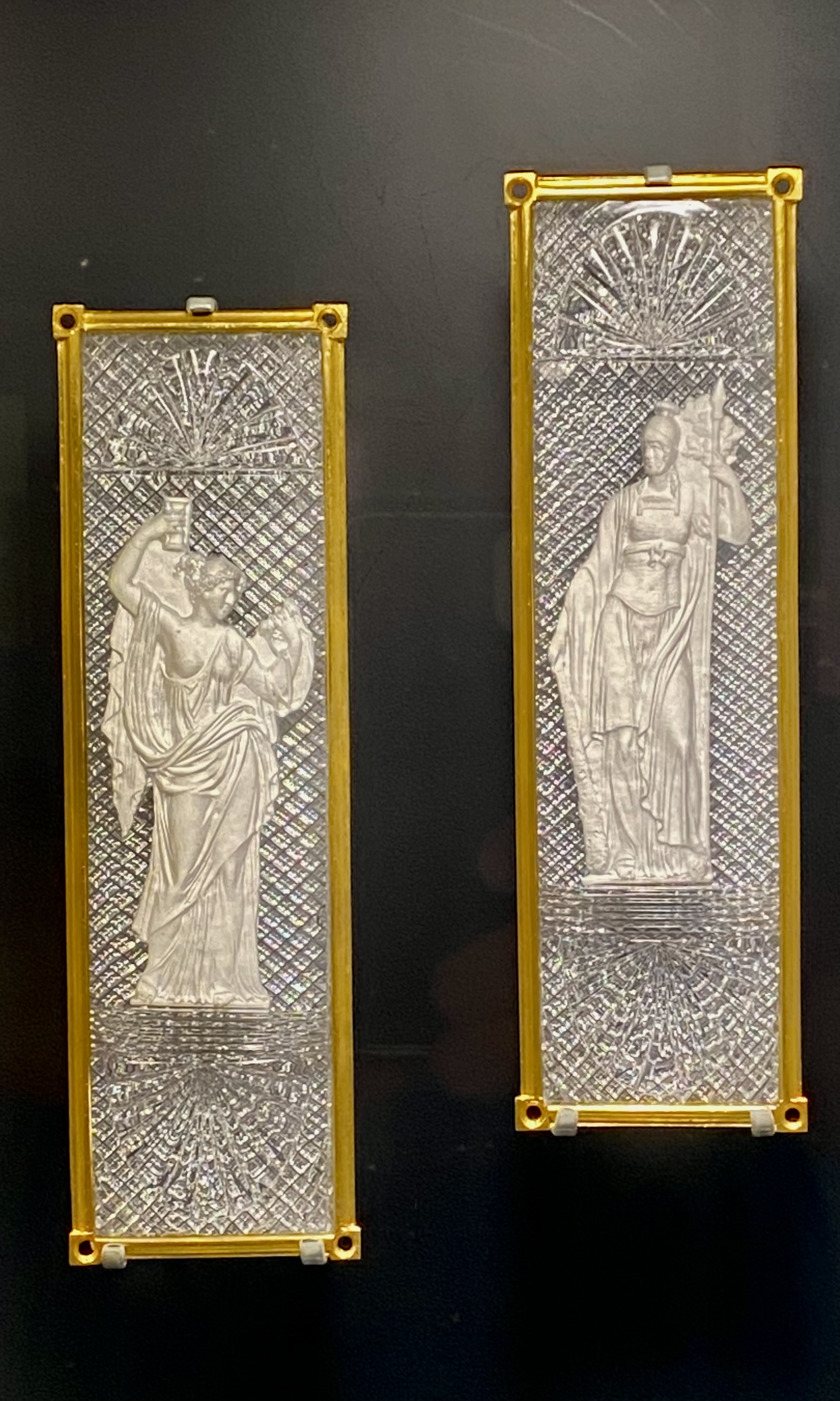
Sulphide door plaques by Apsley Pellatt

The process for making a sulphide was developed in France by Barthélemy Desprez early in the 19th century. (Note: Author David J. Shotwell lists Barthélemy Desprez as the first to successfully encase an image in glass. Author Arlene M. Palmer mentions Desprez and his son as ceramic artists that were among the first to produce sulphide portrait glassware, but she says the "first record of Desprez cameo portraits in glass only occurs in 1819"—and a French patent for improving (not inventing) the process for embedding images in glass was issued in 1818.) Originally a chemist at the French porcelain company Manufacture nationale de Sèvres, Desprez made the "finest sulphides". Desprez was employed at Sèvres from 1773 until 1783, and from 1786 to 1792. His job titles were modeler, chief modeler, and supervisor of the preparation of porcelain bodies. His son, Barthélemy Desprez Jr., was also involved with cameo portraits in glass. Another early French creator of sulphide portrait glassware, who also worked at one time at Sèvres, was the Chevalier de Saint-Amans (Pierre Honoré Boudon de Saint-Amans). Saint-Amans received a French patent in 1818 for improving (not creating) the process for encrusting cameos in glass. An 1850 report credits Saint-Amans with producing "marvels of artistic beauty".

In England, ceramic portrait medallions made by Josiah Wedgwood created interest in the production of portraits encased in glass. Wedgwood was a potter who was one of the first to industrialize pottery manufacturing, and he was also credited with inventing modern marketing. Glassmaker Apsley Pellatt received an English patent for the sulphide process in 1819. His sulphides were typically medallions or paperweights. They could also be set in plaques of glass to be hung on a wall. Some sulphide portraits were added to the sides or the bottoms of glassware such as tumblers, beakers, and bottles. Pellatt's cameos consisted of china clay, sand, and potash that were cast in molds and then heated to a hardness so the clay mixture would withstand encasement in glass. The Pellatt family ran London's Falcon Glass Works, and it has been described as the "pre-eminent London glassmaking factory of the 19th century". Pellatt produced sulphide portrait glassware from the 1820s until the 1850s. He died in 1863.

== Early production in the United States ==
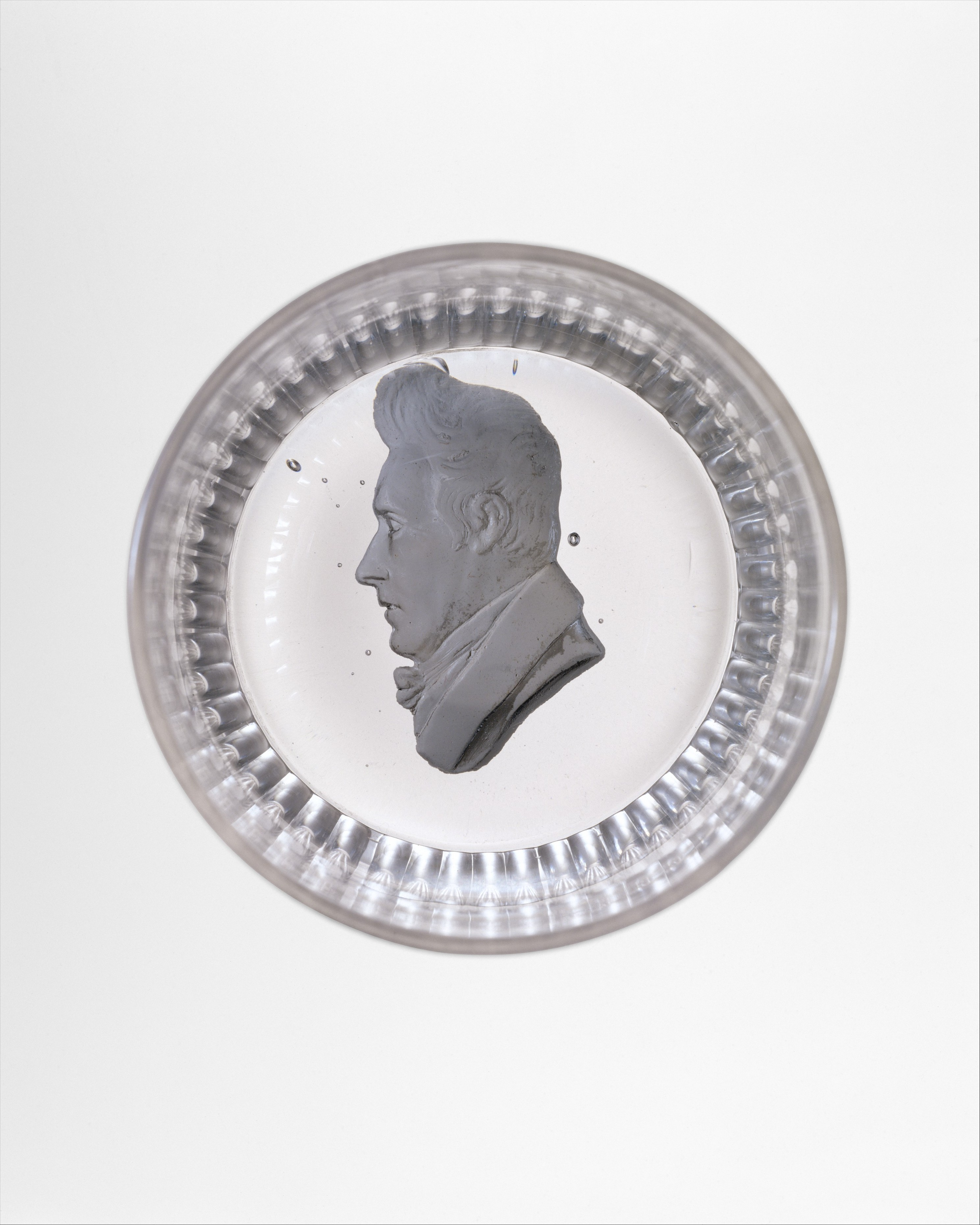
Sulphide Andrew Jackson portrait in base of tumbler by Bakewell, Page & Bakewell Metropolitan Museum of Art

Benjamin Bakewell moved to New York from London in 1793. In London he had been an importer of luxury goods, and he started the same type of business in his new home city. Because of his occupation, Bakewell was very familiar with French and English fashions and styles. In 1808 Bakewell ended his import business and began a glass factory in Pittsburgh, and beginning September 1, 1813, his glass-making business was renamed Bakewell, Page and Bakewell. (Note: Pittsburgh's Bakewell glass company had nine different names, but its glassmaking plant was called the Pittsburgh Flint Glass Manufactory. The company names are: Bakewell & Ensell (1808–1809); Benjamin Bakewell & Company (1809–1813); Bakewell, Page & Bakewell (1813–1827); Bakewell, Page & Bakewells (1827–1832); Bakewells & Anderson (1832–1836); Bakewells & Company (1836–1842); Bakewell & Pears (1842–1844); Bakewell, Pears & Company (1844–1880); and Bakewell, Pears & Company, Ltd. (1880–1882).) Bakewell employed English and French glassmakers, and chose to compete with high-quality European glass companies. A decade later, he was producing one of the "most fashionable and difficult" objects of European glass ornamentation: sulphide portrait glassware.

In 1824, Marquis de Lafayette began a tour of the United States. Lafayette had achieved fame from his service in the Continental Army during the American Revolutionary War. His visit to Pittsburgh during May 1825 included a tour of Bakewell's glass works. Aware of European sulphide portrait glassware and capitalizing on Lafayette's popularity, Bakewell produced both commemorative tumblers and tumblers with a sulphide portrait of Lafayette in its base. (Note: At times Benjamin Bakewell would present gifts of glassware, knowing that the publicity would benefit his company. Strategic gifts caused presidents James Monroe and Andrew Jackson to order Bakewell glassware for the White House. He also sent samples of his glassware to Hezekiah Niles, editor of the National Register during a time when the nation was debating the need for protective tariffs. The glassware proved to the editor of a well-read national magazine that Bakewell products were high-quality and worthy of protection.) A sulphide portrait tumbler was also produced of Senator (and future president of the United States) Andrew Jackson, commander of American troops in the Battle of New Orleans during the War of 1812. Jackson was an opponent of John Quincy Adams for president of the United States, and Adams' policies were not considered favorable to manufacturers. Other sulphide glassware known to have been made by Bakewell included images of George Washington, Benjamin Franklin and DeWitt Clinton. Clinton was a champion of transportation infrastructure projects such as the Erie Canal, which benefited glass producers by lowering transportation costs.

The American production of sulphide portrait glassware is thought to have ended a few years after 1825, and Bakewell is the only American company known to have produced it in significant quantities during that period. Bakewell's major rival, New England Glass Company, did not advertise anything similar. Sulphide glassware remained popular in Europe, but did not revive in the United States until the 1850s. There is no evidence that Bakewell was involved in sulphide portrait glassware in the 1850s, and sulphide portrait bottles and paperweights from that period are thought to have been produced by factories from New England and New Jersey.

Sulphide portrait glassware
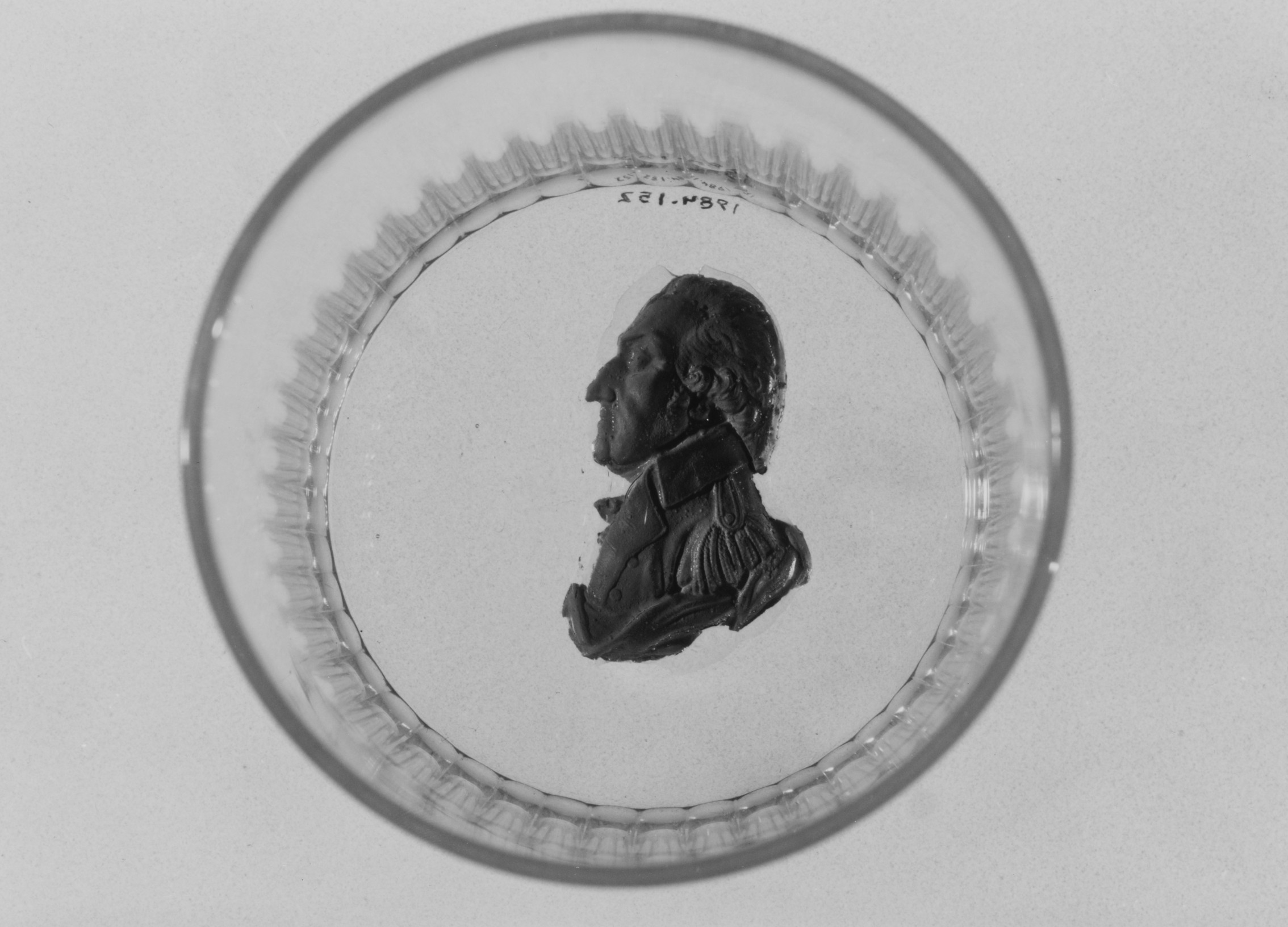
George Washington tumbler by
Bakewell, Page & Bakewell
Metropolitan Museum of Art

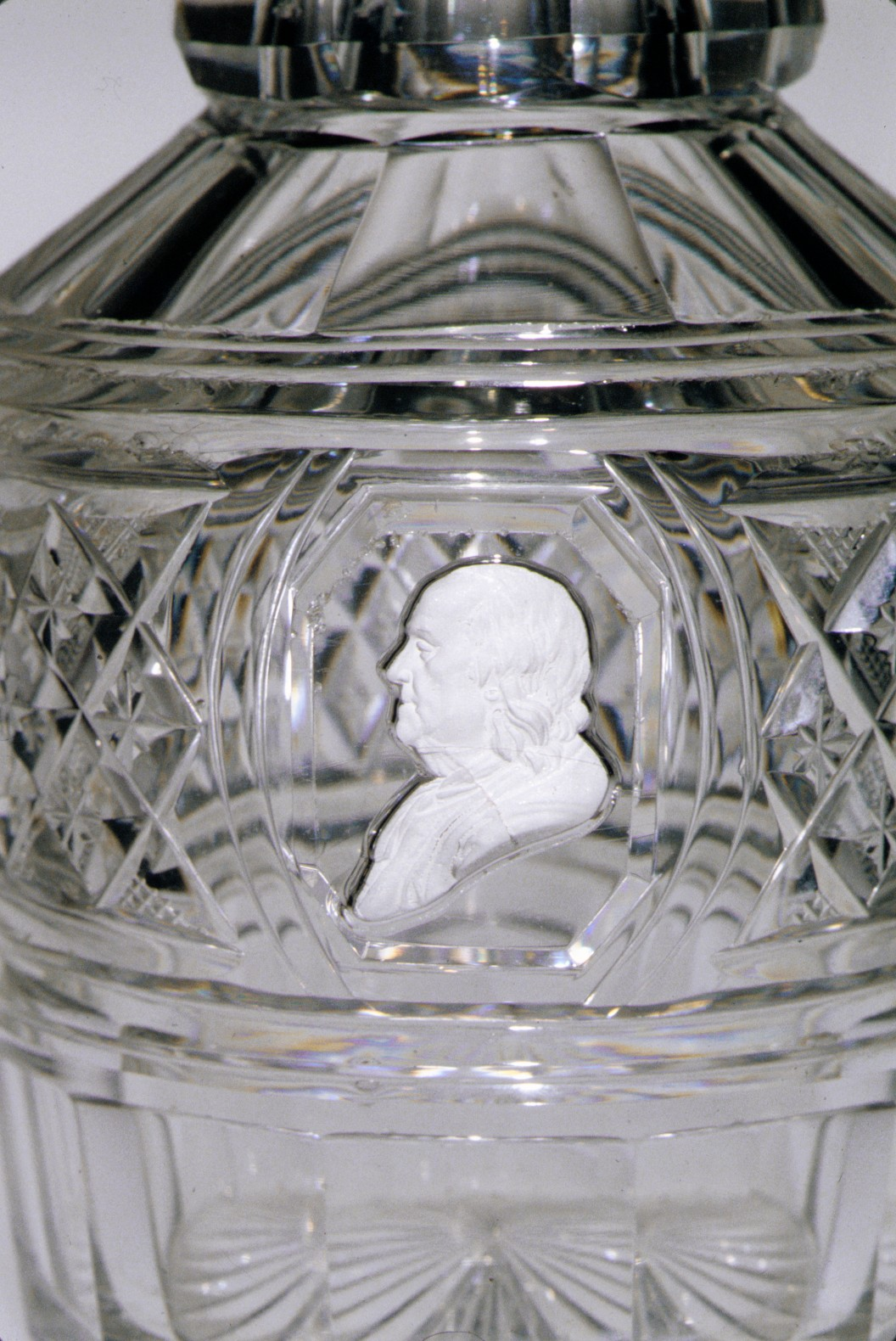
Franklin decanter by
Bakewell, Page & Bakewell
Metropolitan Museum of Art

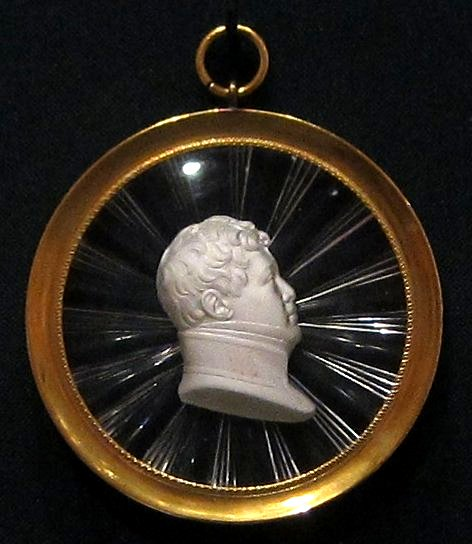
Kamehameha II medallion by
Apsley Pellatt
Honolulu Museum of Art

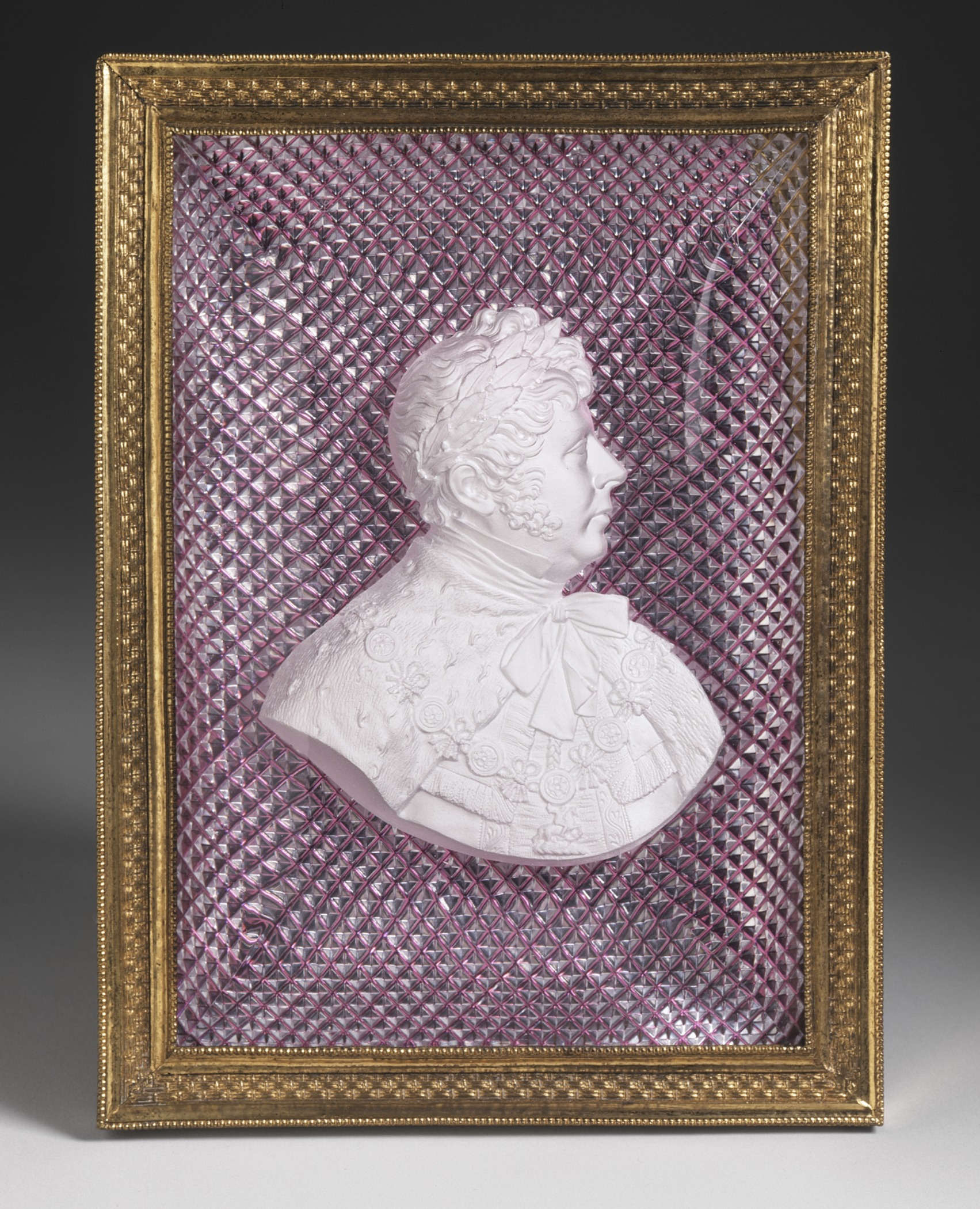
George IV plaque by
Apsley Pellatt
L.A. County Museum of Art

== Notes ==
=== References ===
- Bakewell, Benjamin Gifford (1896). The Family Book of Bakewell, Page, Campbell; Being Some Account of the Descendants of John Bakewell... Pittsburgh, Pennsylvania: W.G. Johnston & Co. OCLC 475684153. Archived from the original on May 15, 2024.
- Gordon, John Stuart (2018). American Glass: The Collections at Yale. New Haven, Connecticut: Yale University Art Gallery in association with Yale University Press. ISBN 978-0-30022-669-0. OCLC 1024165135.
- Jokelson, Paul (1968). Sulphides; The Art of Cameo Incrustation. New York, New York: Galahad Books. OCLC 1434413091.
- Madarasz, Anne; Historical Society of Western Pennsylvania; Senator John Heinz Pittsburgh Regional History Center (1998). Glass: Shattering Notions. Pittsburgh, Pennsylvania: Historical Society of Western Pennsylvania. ISBN 978-0-93634-001-2. OCLC 39921461.
- Palmer, Arlene (1979). "American Heroes in Glass: The Bakewell Sulphide Portraits". American Art Journal. 11 (1). Chicago, Illinois: University of Chicago Press, Smithsonian American Art Museum: 4–26. doi:10.2307/1594129. JSTOR 1594129. Archived from the original on February 24, 2023.
- Palmer, Arlene (2004). Artistry and Innovation in Pittsburgh glass, 1808-1882: from Bakewell & Ensell to Bakewell, Pears & Co. Pittsburgh, Pennsylvania: Frick Art & Historical Center. ISBN 978-0-82294-252-8. OCLC 494286738.
- Shotwell, David J. (2002). Glass A to Z. Iola, Wisconsin: Krause Publications. pp. 638. ISBN 978-0-87349-385-7. OCLC 440702171.
