= LEXO =

Glass tumbler

- Product type: Vacuum-Insulated Stainless-Steel Drinkware
- Produced by: ThermAvant International, LLC
- Country: United States
- Introduced: December 2016; 9 years ago
- Markets: Worldwide
- Website: lexolife.com

LEXO is the original version of the upgraded BURNOUT temperature regulating tumbler brand from manufacturer ThermAvant International, LLC, based in Columbia, Missouri.

== History ==
The creator of LEXO, Hongbin "Bill" Ma, is a professor of mechanical and aerospace engineering and director of the Center for Thermal Management at the University of Missouri. After noticing how often he forgot coffee while waiting for it to cool, Ma began working on a “cup with constant temperature” in the summer of 2015. The LEXO was released to the general public in December 2016.

== Design ==
The LEXO uses bio-based phase-change and advanced heat transfer materials to absorb the initial heat of the beverage and cool it to a more drinkable temperature. When the temperature begins to drop, the LEXO slowly releases the stored heat back into the drink. The LEXO can also insulate cold liquids.

The LEXO has three layers of 18/8 stainless-steel and BPA-free plastic lids.
