= Measuring spoon =

Spoon used to measure an amount of an ingredient

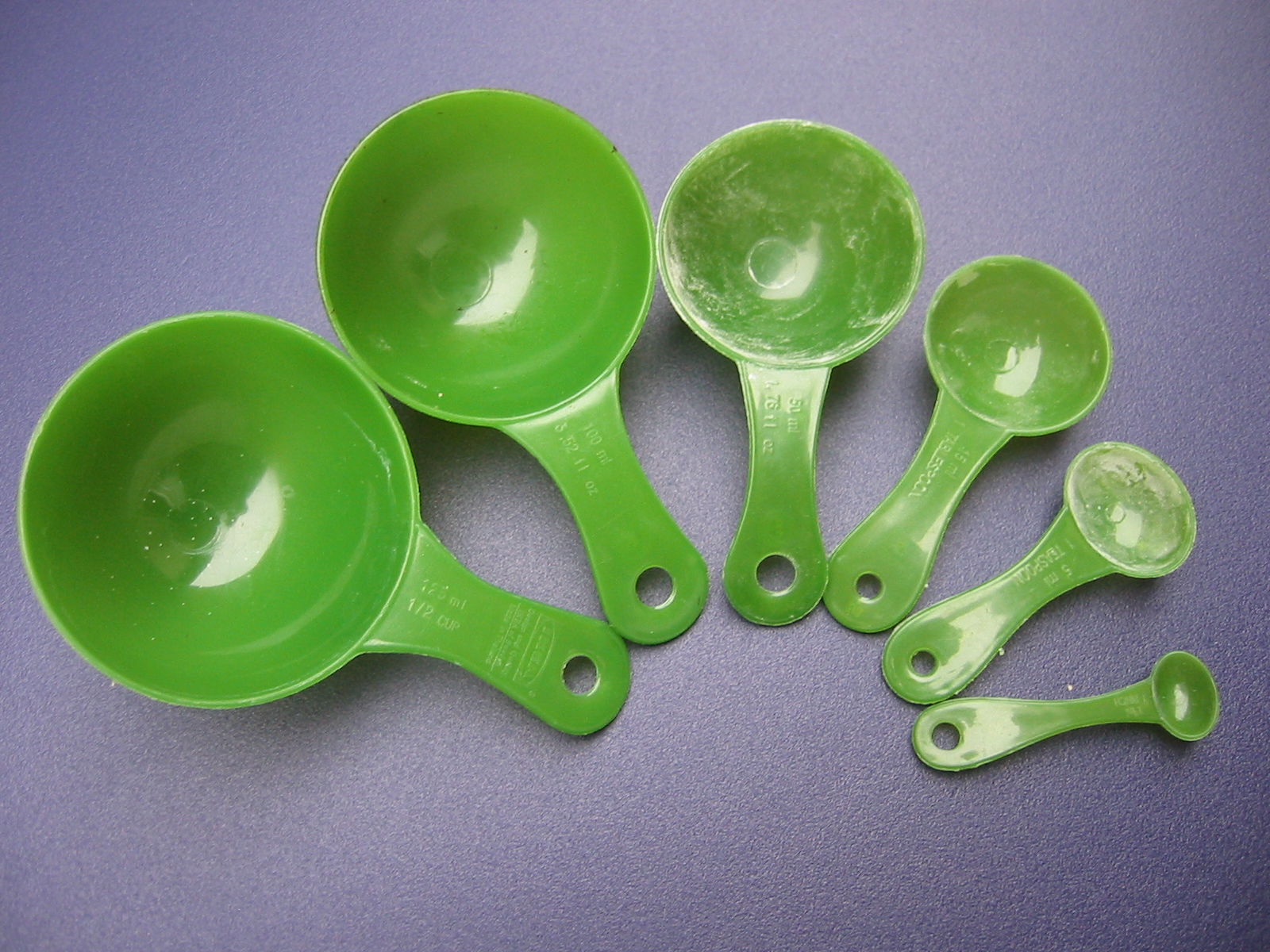
Metric measuring spoons, 1–125 mL

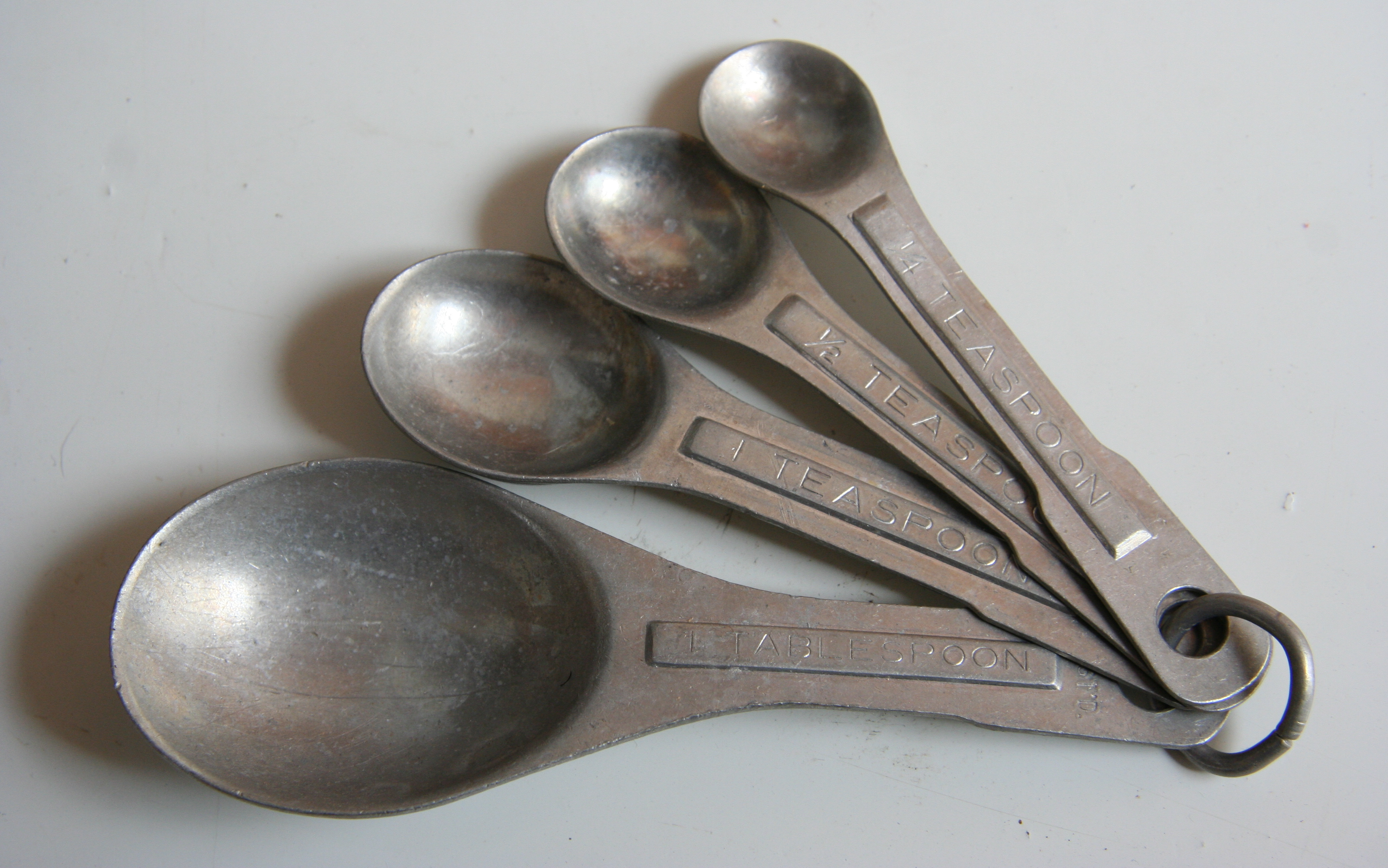
Measuring spoons (customary units) - 1 tablespoon, 1 teaspoon, 1/2 teaspoon, 1/4 teaspoon

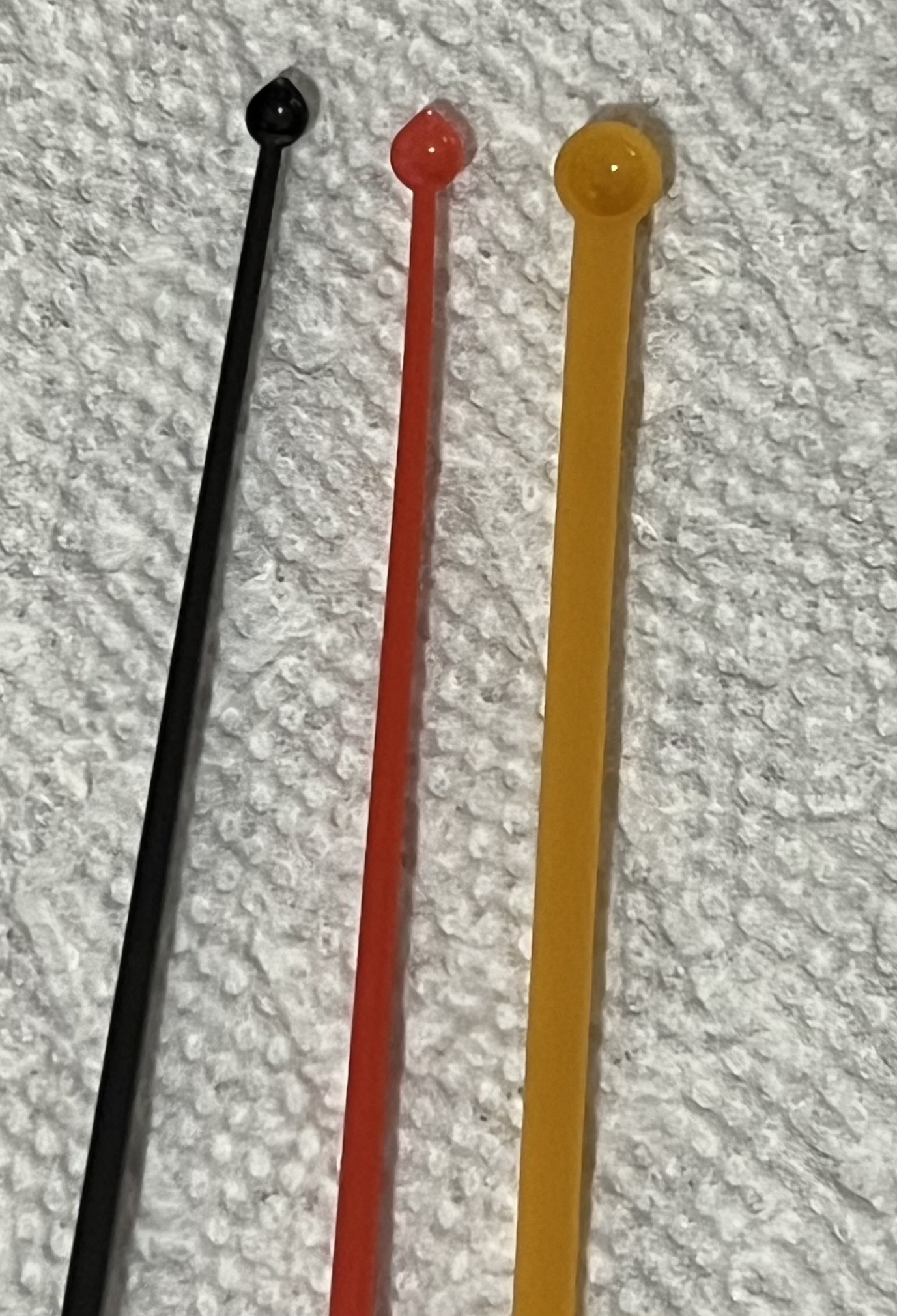
Micro scoops for measuring milligram units of compounds; 6–10 mg (black), 10–15 mg (red), 25–30 mg (yellow)

A measuring spoon is a spoon used to measure an amount of an ingredient, either liquid or dry, when cooking. Measuring spoons may be made of plastic, metal, and other materials. They are available in many sizes, including the teaspoon and tablespoon.

== Country differences ==
=== International ===
Metric measuring spoons are available in sets, usually between four and six, typically with decilitre (100 ml), tablespoon (15 ml), teaspoon (5 ml) and millilitre measures. For fractional measures, there is often a line inside to indicate "half" or "a quarter", or a separate measure may be included, like 1/2 dl.

=== United States ===
In the U.S., measuring spoons often come in sets, usually between four and six. This usually includes 1/4 teaspoon, 1/2 teaspoon, 1 teaspoon, and 1 tablespoon. The volume of a traditional US teaspoon is 4.9 ml and that of a tablespoon is 14.8 ml, only slightly less than standard metric measuring spoons.

=== Japan ===
In Japan, usually two spoons are used: a large spoon (大さじ, Ōsaji) and a small spoon (小さじ, Kosaji or Shōsaji). A large spoon is 15 milliliters, and a small spoon is 5 milliliters. Sometimes a much smaller spoon may be used, usually a 2.5 milliliter spoon (1/2 small spoon).

=== Australia ===
The Australian definition of the tablespoon as a unit of volume is larger than most:

| 1 Australian tablespoon | = 20 ml |
| | = 2 dessertspoons, | 1 dessertspoon = | 10 ml each |
| | = 4 teaspoons, | 1 teaspoon = | 5 ml each |

== Measuring dry ingredients ==
Unlike liquids, which can be measured consistently by volume, dry and pasty ingredients are more challenging to measure accurately and can be measured in different ways:

- Heaped spoon refers to a spoon filled above the rim with the maximum amount of the ingredient that can stay on the measuring spoon.
- Packed spoon requires ingredients to be pressed down or "packed" to get a consistent, repeatable measure. Firmly packed means the ingredient is pressed as tightly as possible into the spoon, while a lightly packed spoon requires the ingredients to be only packed tightly enough to ensure no air pockets.
- Leveled spoon requires the spoon to be filled slightly above the rim and then leveled at the rim, using a straight edge to produce a consistent volume. Some measuring spoon sets include a specialized leveller for this purpose.

== Specialized measuring spoons ==
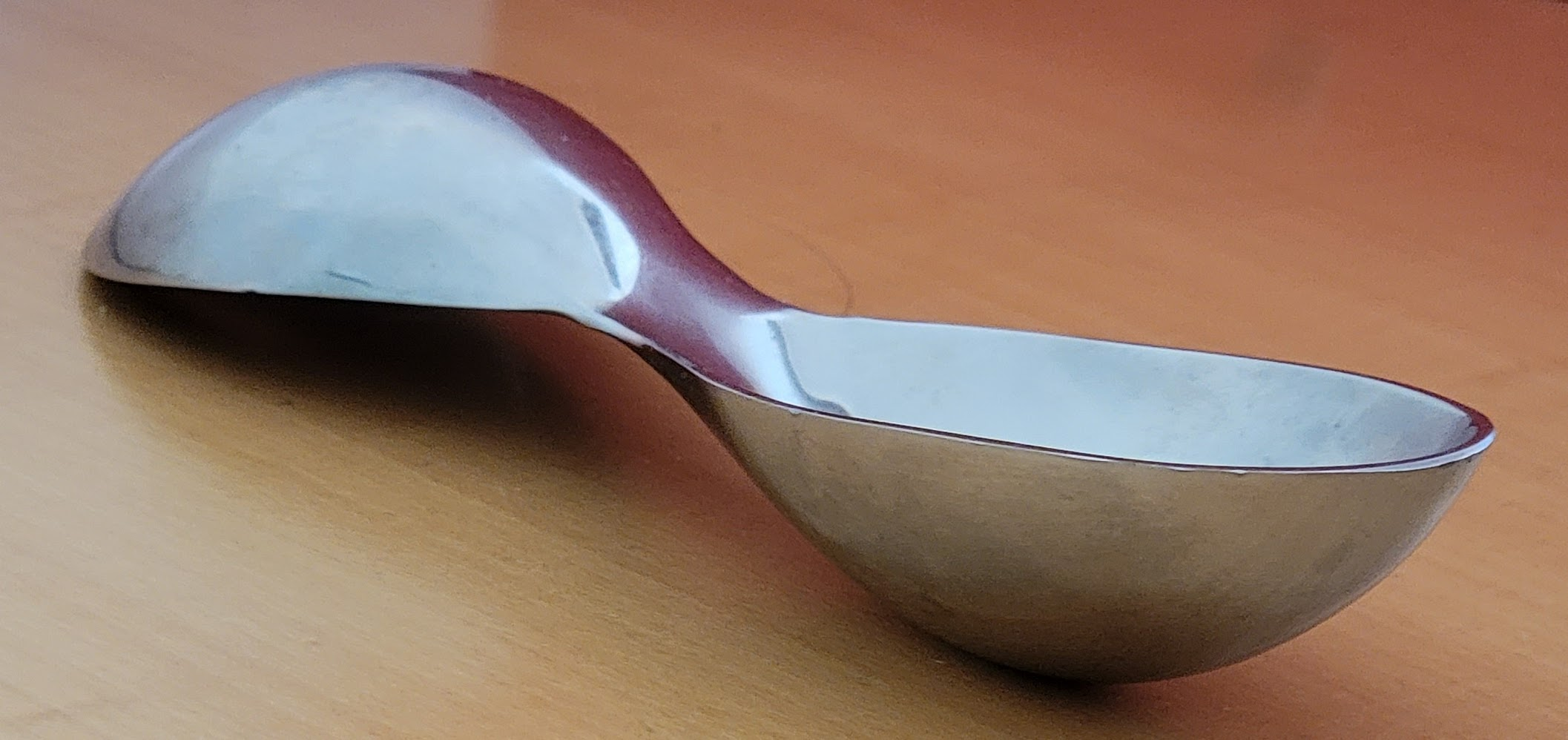
Stainless steel coffee measuring spoon, 7 and 10 gr

Special spoons are manufactured to measure popular materials for common tasks. For example, for coffee the standard measuring spoon contains 7 grams of coffee powder, adequate for an espresso.

== Measuring with cutlery spoons ==
Cutlery in many countries includes two spoons (besides the fork and knife, or butterknife). These cutlery spoons are also called a "teaspoon" and "tablespoon", but are not necessarily the same volume as measuring spoons with the same names: Cutlery spoons are not made to standard sizes and may hold 2.5~7.3 ml (50%~146% of 5 ml) for teaspoons and 7~20 ml (47%~133% of 15 ml) for tablespoons. The difference in size can be dangerous when cutlery is used for critical measurements, like medication.

== See also ==
- Measuring cup
- Cooking weights and measures
- Kitchen utensil
