= Cup (unit) =

Cooking measure of volume

cup
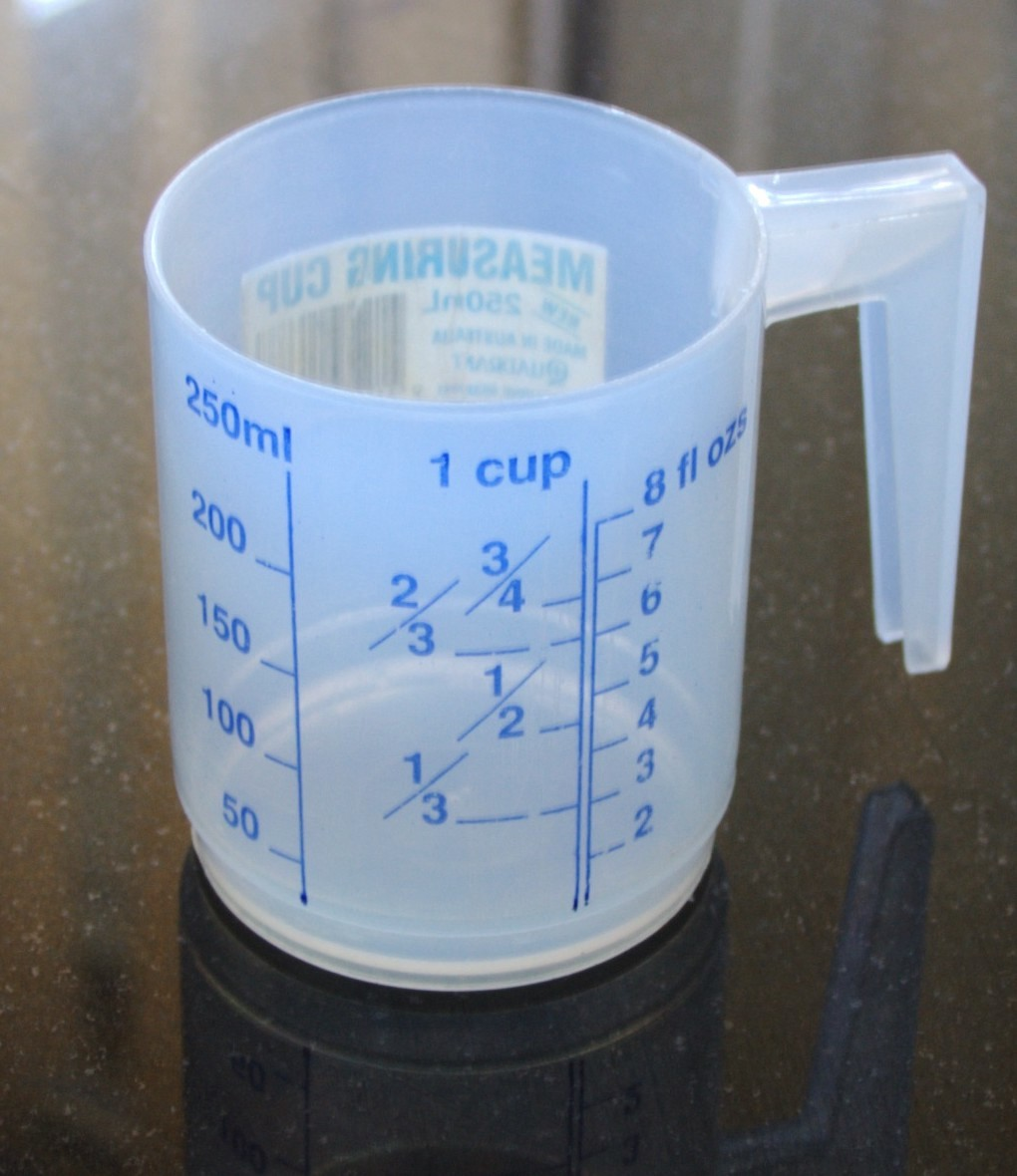
- A simple plastic measuring cup, capable of holding the volume one metric cup with a scale for US fluid ounces

General information
- Unit system: US customary units
- Unit of: Volume
- Symbol: cup

Conversions (US)
1 US cup in ...	... is equal to ...
- SI units: 236.588 mL

The cup is a cooking measure of volume, commonly associated with cooking and serving sizes. In the US customary system, it is equal to one-half US pint (8.0 US fl oz; 8.3 imp fl oz; 236.6 ml). Because actual drinking cups may differ greatly from the size of this unit, standard measuring cups may be used, with a metric cup commonly being rounded up to 240 millilitres (legal cup), but 250 ml is also used depending on the measuring scale.

== United States ==
=== Customary cup ===
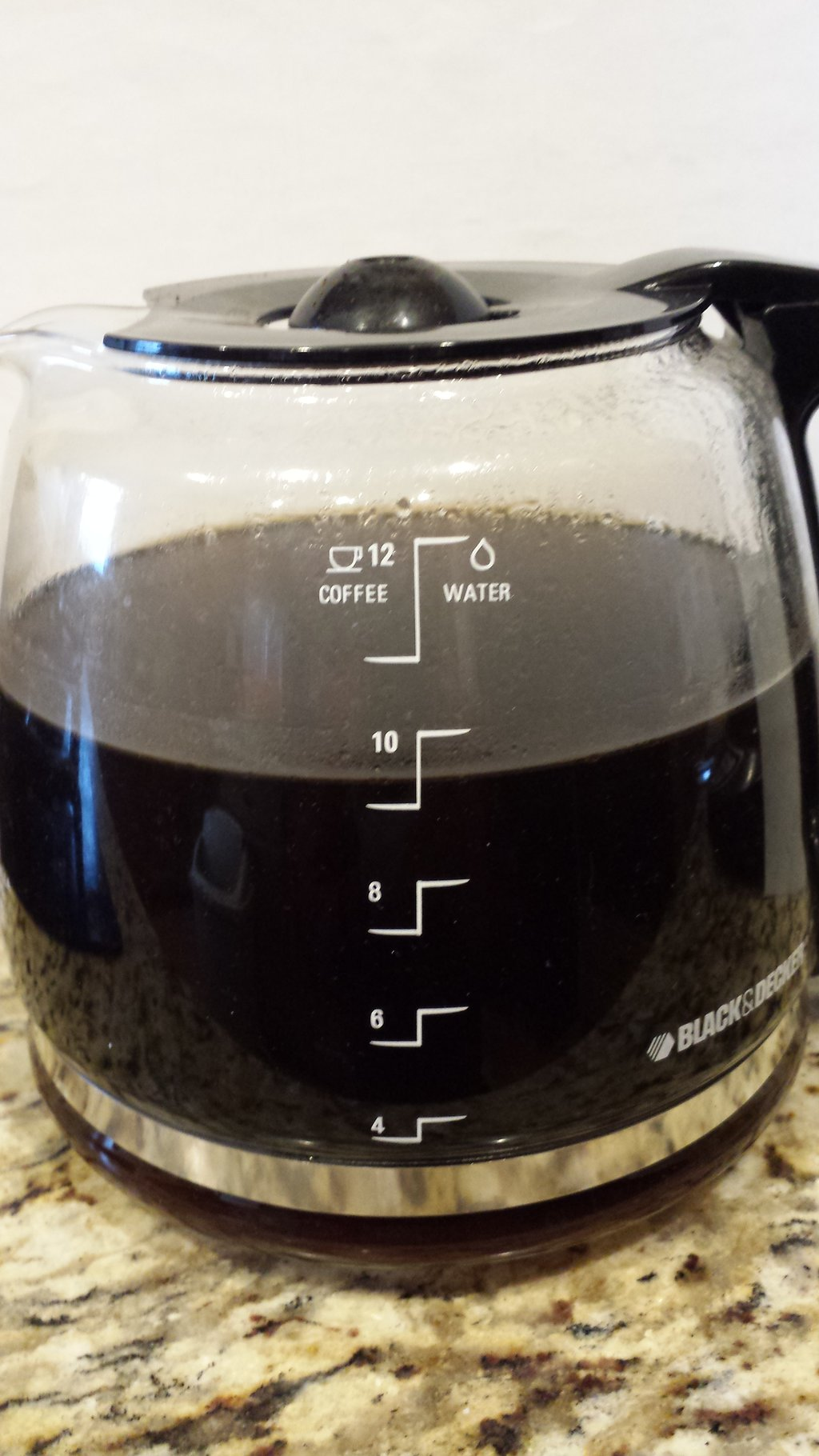
Coffee carafe showing gradations for measuring water (right) and brewed coffee (left) in multiples of non-standard US customary cups.

In the United States, the customary cup is half of a US liquid pint.

1 US customary cup	=	1/16	US customary gallon
	=	1/4	US customary quart
	=	1/2	US customary pint
	=	8	US customary fluid ounces
	=	16	US customary tablespoons
	=	48	US customary teaspoons
	=	236.5882365	millilitres exactly
	=	0.946352946	metric cup
	=	15.7725491	international metric tablespoons
	=	11.829411825	Australian metric tablespoons
	≈	8 1/3	imperial fluid ounces
	≈	0.83	UK tumbler
	≈	1.04	UK breakfast cups
	≈	1.39	UK cups
	≈	1.67	UK teacups
	≈	3.33	UK coffee cups
	≈	4.16	UK wine glasses

=== Legal cup ===
The cup currently used in the United States for nutrition labelling is defined in United States law as 240 ml.

1 US "legal" cup	=	240	millilitres
	=	0.96	metric cup
	=	16	international metric tablespoons
	=	12	Australian metric tablespoons
	=	8	US nutritional fluid ounces (30 ml each)
	≈	8.12	US customary fluid ounces
	≈	1.01	US customary cups
	≈	8.45	imperial fluid ounces
	≈	0.84	UK tumbler
	≈	1.06	UK breakfast cups
	≈	1.41	UK cups
	≈	1.69	UK teacups
	≈	3.38	UK coffee cups
	≈	4.22	UK wine glasses

=== Conversion table to US legal cup ===
The following information is describing that how to measure US legal cup in different ways.

1 cubic metre	=	4,166.6667	US legal cups
1 litre	=	4.16667	US legal cups
1 US legal tablespoon	=	0.0625	US legal cup
1 US legal teaspoon	=	0.020833333	US legal cup
1 metric cup	=	1.04	US legal cups
1 international metric tablespoon	=	0.062501	US legal cup
1 Australian metric tablespoon	=	0.083333	US legal cup
1 metric teaspoon	=	0.020833	US legal cup
1 US gallon	≈	15.772549	US legal cups
1 US pint	≈	1.9715686	US legal cups
1 US customary cup	≈	0.98578432	US legal cup
1 US fluid ounce	≈	0.12322304	US legal cup
1 US customary tablespoon	≈	0.06161152	US legal cup
1 US customary teaspoon	≈	0.020537173	US legal cup
1 cubic foot	≈	117.987	US legal cups
1 cubic inch	≈	0.0682794	US legal cup
1 imperial gallon	≈	18.942	US legal cups
1 imperial pint	≈	2.36776	US legal cups
1 imperial fluid ounce	≈	0.118388	US legal cup
1 UK tablespoon	≈	0.059194	US legal cup
1 UK teaspoon	≈	0.014798	US legal cup
1 UK tumbler	≈	1.18	US legal cups
1 UK breakfast cup	≈	0.95	US legal cup
1 UK cup	≈	0.71	US legal cup
1 UK teacup	≈	0.59	US legal cup
1 UK coffee cup	≈	0.30	US legal cup
1 UK wine glass	≈	0.24	US legal cup

=== Coffee cup ===
A "cup" of coffee in the US is usually 4 fluid ounces (118 ml), brewed using 5 fluid ounces (148 ml) of water. Coffee carafes used with drip coffee makers, e.g. Black and Decker models, have markings for both water and brewed coffee as the carafe is also used for measuring water prior to brewing. A 12-cup carafe, for example, has markings for 4, 6, 8, 10, and 12 cups of water or coffee, which correspond to 20, 30, 40, 50, and 60 US fluid ounces (0.59, 0.89, 1.18, 1.48, and 1.77 litres) of water or 16, 24, 32, 40, and 48 US fluid ounces (0.47, 0.71, 0.95, 1.18, and 1.42 litres) of brewed coffee respectively, the difference being the volume absorbed by the coffee grounds and lost to evaporation during brewing.

== Commonwealth of Nations ==
=== Metric cup ===
Australia, Canada, New Zealand, and some other members of the Commonwealth of Nations, being former British colonies that have since metricated, employ a "metric cup" of 250 millilitres. Although derived from the metric system, it is not an SI unit.

1 metric cup	=	250	millilitres
	=	16 2/3	international metric tablespoons (15mL each)
	=	12 1/2	Australian metric tablespoons (20mL each)
	=	25	metric dessert spoons (10mL each)
	=	50	metric teaspoons (5mL each)
	≈	8.80	imperial fluid ounces
	≈	8.45	US customary fluid ounces
	≈	1.06	US customary cups

A "coffee cup" is 1.5 dL (i.e. 150 millilitres or 5.07 US customary fluid ounces), and is occasionally used in recipes; in older recipes, cup may mean "coffee cup". It is also used in the US to specify coffeemaker sizes (what can be referred to as a Tasse à café). A "12-cup" US coffeemaker makes 57.6 US customary fluid ounces of coffee, which is equal to 6.8 metric cups of coffee.

=== Canadian cup ===
Canada now usually employs the metric cup of 250 ml, but its conventional cup was somewhat smaller than both American and imperial units.

1 Canadian cup	=	8	imperial fluid ounces
	=	1/20	imperial gallon
	=	227.3045	millilitres
	≈	0.96	US customary cup
	≈	0.91	metric cup
1 Canadian tablespoon	=	1/2	imperial fluid ounces
	=	14.2065	millilitres
	=	1	UK tablespoon
	≈	0.96	US customary tablespoon
	≈	0.95	international metric tablespoon
	≈	0.71	Australian metric tablespoon
1 Canadian teaspoon	=	4.7355	millilitres
	=	1 1/3	UK teaspoons
	≈	0.96	US customary teaspoon
	≈	0.95	metric teaspoon

=== British cup ===
British cookery books and recipes, especially those from the days before the UK's partial metrication, commonly called for quantities measured by ordinary drinking vessels, such as a 'tumblerful' of one ingredient and a 'wineglassful' of another one. Unlike the standard US customary cup, these are not precise units; there is no imperial unit–based culinary measuring cup. Today, recipes normally use imperial fluid ounces or millilitres, and recipes referring to 'cups' are generally assumed either to refer to US customary cups or to be an inexact measure.

The 1894 book Enquire Within Upon Everything states that 1 cup "usually contains about" 6 imperial fluid ounces (fl oz).

1 UK cup	=	6	imperial fluid ounces
	=	3/5	UK tumbler
	=	3/4	UK breakfast cup
	=	1 1/5	UK teacups
	=	2 2/5	UK coffee cups
	=	3	UK wine glasses
	=	3/10	imperial pint
	≈	5.76	US customary fluid ounces
	≈	0.72	US customary cup
	≈	170.48	millilitres
	≈	0.68	metric cup

The same book also mentions two British culinary measurement units of volume based on drinking vessels: the tumbler ("usually contains about" 10 fl oz, which is 1/2 imp pint) and the wine glass ("usually contains about" 2 fl oz). The 'wine glass' here refers to a small glass for serving liquor, not a typical wine glass. Since the UK is not a major producer of wine, typical wine‑glass sizes are those used by the biggest suppliers of wine, especially EU producers, who exclusively use metric measurements. Common wine‑glass sizes are 125 ml (about 4.4 UK fluid ounces or 4.23 US fluid ounces) and 250 ml (about 8.8 UK fluid ounces or 8.45 US fluid ounces), corresponding to 1/6 and 1/3, respectively, of a standard wine bottle (750 ml; about 26.4 UK fluid ounces or 25.36 US fluid ounces), but these are not generally used as units.

The cookery writer Elizabeth David, writing in The Spectator, referred to the other three British culinary measurement units of volume based on drinking vessels and gave their typical capacities, in contrast to the exact US measure: the breakfast cup (8 fl oz), the teacup (5 fl oz), and the coffee cup (2 1/2 fl oz).

Of these, the breakfast cup is the most similar in size to the standard US customary cup and metric cup. It is slightly smaller than the US customary cup since the US fluid ounce is slightly larger than the UK fluid ounce. There is division of labour between these six units of volume, like the tablespoon and the teaspoon.

== International ==
Similar units in other languages and cultures are sometimes translated "cup", usually with various values around 1/5 to 1/4 of a litre.

=== Latin American cup ===
In Latin America, the amount of a "cup" (Spanish: taza) varies from country to country, using a cup of 200 ml (about 7.04 British imperial fluid ounces or 6.76 US customary fluid ounces), 250 ml (about 8.80 British imperial fluid ounces or 8.45 US customary fluid ounces), and the US legal or customary amount.

=== Japanese cup ===
The traditional Japanese unit equated with a "cup" size is the gō, legally equated with 2,401/13,310 litre (≈ 180.4 ml/6.35 British imperial fluid ounces/6.1 US customary fluid ounces) in 1891, and is still used for reckoning amounts of rice and sake. The legacy of this is that the rough metric equivalent of the gō, 180 ml, is used for the cups that are sold with rice cookers throughout East Asia, Europe and the United States.

The Japanese later defined a "cup" as 200 ml.

1 Japanese cup	=	200	millilitres
	≈	7.04	British imperial fluid ounces
	≈	6.76	US customary fluid ounces

=== Russian cup ===
The traditional Russian measurement system included two cup sizes: the "charka" (cup proper) and the "stakan" ("glass"). The charka was usually used for alcoholic drinks and is 123mL (about 4.33 British imperial fluid ounces or 4.16 US customary fluid ounces), while the stakan, used for other liquids, was twice as big and is 246mL (about 8.66 British imperial fluid ounces or 8.32 US customary fluid ounces).

Since metrication, the charka was informally redefined as 100 ml (about 3.52 British imperial fluid ounces or 3.38 US customary fluid ounces), acquiring a new name of "stopka" (related to the traditional Russian measurement unit "stopa"), while there are currently two widely used glass sizes of 250mL (about 8.80 British imperial fluid ounces or 8.45 US customary fluid ounces) and 200 ml (about 7.04 British imperial fluid ounces or 6.76 US customary fluid ounces).

=== Dutch cup ===
In The Netherlands, traditionally a "cup" (Dutch: kopje) amounts to 150 ml (about 5.28 British imperial fluid ounces or 5.07 US customary fluid ounces). However, in modern recipes, the US legal cup of 240 ml (about 8.45 British imperial fluid ounces or 8.12 US customary fluid ounces) is more commonly used.

== Dry measure ==
In Europe, recipes normally weigh non-liquid ingredients in grams rather than measuring volume. For example, where an American recipe might specify "1 cup of sugar and 2 cups of milk", a European recipe might specify "200 g sugar and 500 ml of milk". A precise conversion between the two measures takes into account the density of the ingredients, and some recipes specify both weight and volume to facilitate this conversion. Many European measuring cups have markings that indicate the weight of common ingredients for a given volume.

Volume to mass conversions for some common cooking ingredients
Ingredient	Density g/ml (Note: One gram per millilitre is very close to one avoirdupois ounce per fluid ounce: 1 g/ml ≈ 1.002 av oz/imp fl oz. This is not a numerical coincidence, but comes from the original definition of the kilogram as the mass of one litre of water, and the fluid ounce being the volume of an ounce of water. The slight difference is due to water at 4 °C (39 °F) being used for the kilogram, and at 62 °F (17 °C) for the ounce. The US fluid ounce is slightly larger. 1 g/ml ≈ 1.043 av oz/US fl oz.)	Metric cup		UK breakfast cup (Note: Among all six British units that are the equivalents of the US customary cup and the metric cup, the breakfast cup, the cup, and the teacup are chosen to be included in this table because they are the most commonly used to give measurements of the ingredients in this table.)		UK cup		UK teacup		US customary cup	
Ingredient	Density g/ml	g	oz	g	oz	g	oz	g	oz	g	oz
water	1 (Note: The density of water ranges from about 0.96 to 1.00 g/ml dependent on temperature and pressure. The table above assumes a temperature range 0–30 °C (32–86 °F). The variation is too small to make any difference in cooking.)	250	8.8	227.3	8.02	170.48	6.01	142.07	5.01	236.5882	8.3
granulated sugar	0.8	200	7.0	181.84	6.41	136.38	4.81	113.66	4.01	190	6.7
wheat flour	0.5–0.6	120–150	4.4–5.3	113.65–136.38	4.01–4.81	85.24–102.29	3.01–3.61	71.03–85.24	2.50–3.01	120–140	4.2–5.0
table salt	1.2	300	10.6	272.76	9.62	204.58	7.22	170.48	6.01	280	10.0

== See also ==
- Cooking weights and measures
