= Wine glass =

Type of glass for drinking wine, most often stemware

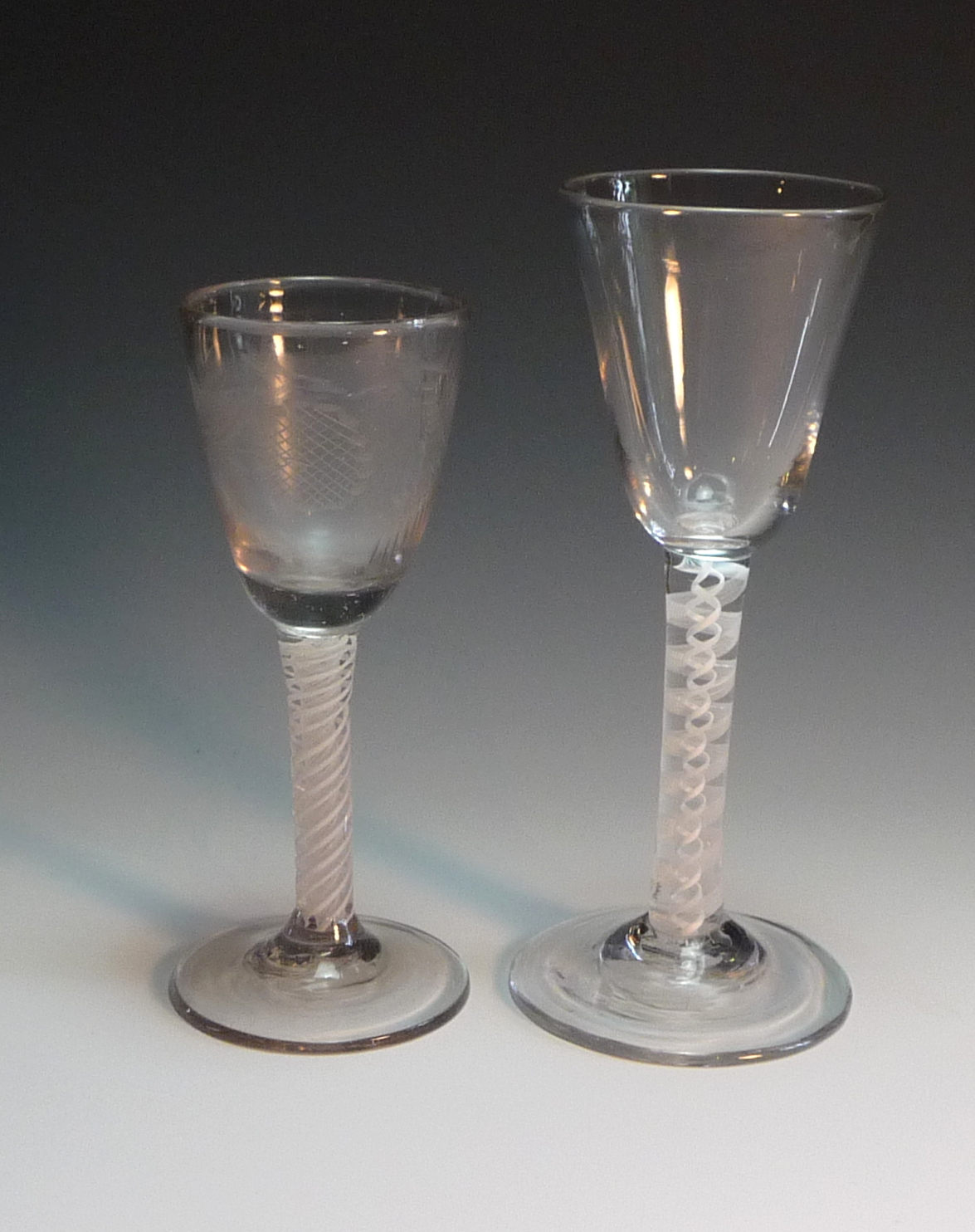
Pair of 18th century opaque twist stem glasses

A wine glass is a type of glass that is used for drinking or tasting wine. Most wine glasses are stemware (goblets), composed of three parts: the bowl, stem, and foot. There are a wide variety of slightly different shapes and sizes, some considered especially suitable for particular types of wine.

Some authors recommend that one hold the glass by the stem, to avoid warming the wine and smudging the bowl; alternately, for red wine it may be good to add some warmth.

Before "glass" became adopted as a word for a glass drinking vessel, a usage first recorded in English c. 1382, wine was drunk from a wine cup, of which there were a huge variety of shapes over history, in many different materials. Wine cups in precious metals remained in use until the Early Modern period, but as glass got better and cheaper, were generally replaced everywhere except in churches, where chalices are still normally in metal. In wealthy homes in England, glasses replaced silver wine cups of very similar size and shape in the 1600s.

== Shapes ==
Variety of shapes of wine glasses and flutes

Studies have shown that the shape of wine glasses has an influence on the aroma and, therefore, the overall flavor of wines. However, the effect of glass shape on the taste of wine, defined as the sensations of sweet, salty, sour, bitter, and umami, has not been demonstrated decisively by any scientific study and remains a matter of debate. Arakawa et al suggest that the shape of the glass is important, as it concentrates the flavour and aroma (or bouquet) to emphasize the varietal's characteristic. One common belief is that the shape of the glass directs the wine itself into the best area of the mouth for the varietal. The importance of wine glass shape could also be based on false ideas about the arrangement of different taste buds on the tongue, such as the discredited tongue map.

Most wine glasses are stemware, composed of three parts: the bowl, stem, and foot. In some designs, the opening of the glass is narrower than the widest part of the bowl to concentrate the aroma. Others are more open, like inverted cones. In addition, "stemless" wine glasses (tumblers) are available in a variety of sizes and shapes. The latter are typically used more casually than their traditional counterparts.

According to the wine critic for The New York Times, the bowl of the glass should be large enough to generously fill a quarter of the glass, it should be transparent, widest at the base and tapering inward to the rim to channel aromas upward.

A 2003 study in Dresden found that the shape of a wine glass does have an impact on the perception of wine odors, in both red and white wines.

A 2015 study by Kohji Mitsubayashi of Tokyo Medical and Dental University and colleagues found that different glass shapes and temperatures can bring out completely different bouquets and finishes from the same wine. The scientists developed a camera system that images ethanol vapor escaping from a wine glass.

A 2023 study published in the journal of sensory studies found that aroma quality increased with a smaller cuppa height and a greater ratio between a wine glass' maximum diameter and opening.

Some common types of wine glasses are described below.

=== Red wine glasses ===
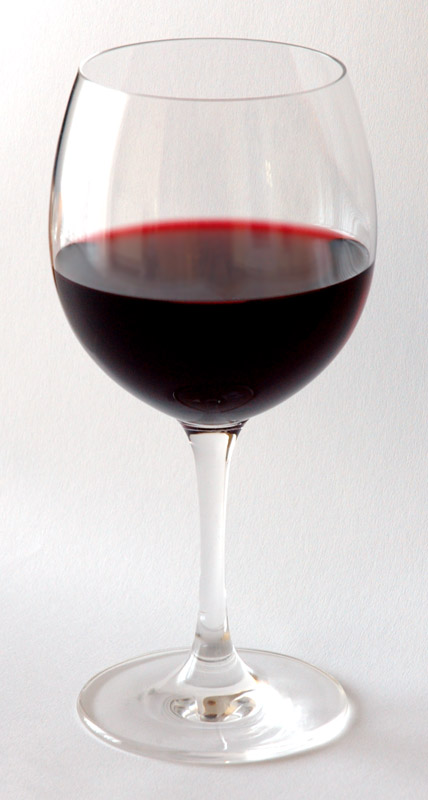

Glasses for red wine are characterized by their rounder, wider bowl, which increases exposure to oxygen and promotes oxidation of phenolic compounds. As oxygen from the air chemically interacts with the wine, flavor and aroma are believed to be subtly altered. This process of oxidation is generally considered more compatible with red wines, whose complex flavours are said to be smoothed out after being exposed to air. According to a wine critic for Observer, the wider opening can help enhance wine flavors and evaporate ethanol. Red wine glasses can have particular styles of their own, such as

- Bordeaux glass: tall with a broad bowl, and is designed for full bodied red wines like Cabernet Sauvignon and Syrah as it directs wine to the back of the mouth.
- Burgundy glass: broader than the Bordeaux glass, it has a bigger bowl to accumulate aromas of more delicate red wines such as Pinot noir. This style of glass directs wine to the tip of the tongue.

=== White wine glasses ===
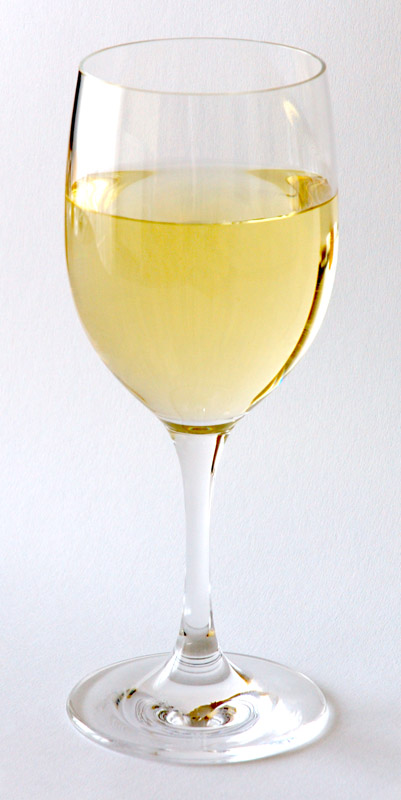

White wine glasses vary enormously in size and shape, from the delicately tapered Champagne flute, to the wide and shallow glasses used to drink Chardonnay. Different shaped glasses are used to accentuate the unique characteristics of different styles of wine. Wide-mouthed glasses function similarly to red wine glasses discussed above, promoting oxidation which is believed to alter the flavor of the wine. However, some studies have shown that phenolic oxidation in different wine glasses did not significantly affect flavor. White wines which are best served slightly oxidized are generally full-flavored wines, such as oaked chardonnay. For lighter, fresher styles of white wine, oxidation is less desirable as it is seen to mask the delicate nuances of the wine. To preserve a crisp, clean flavored wine, many white wine glasses will have a smaller mouth, which reduces surface area and in turn, the rate of oxidization. In the case of sparkling wine, such as Champagne or Asti, an even smaller mouth is used to keep the wine sparkling longer in the glass.

=== Champagne flutes ===
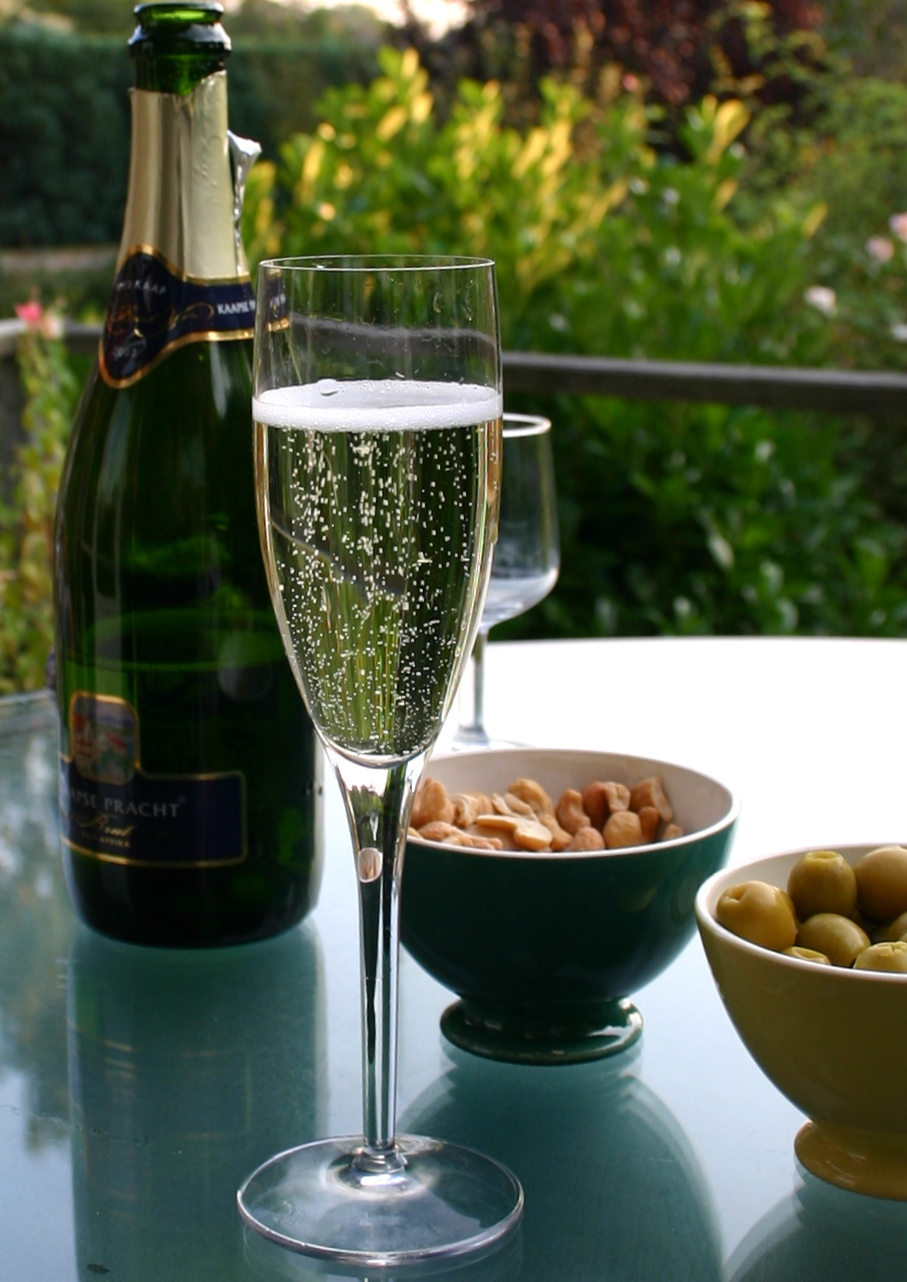
Champagne flute and bottle

Champagne flutes are characterised by a long stem with a tall, narrow bowl on top. The shape is designed to keep sparkling wine desirable during its consumption. Just as with wine glasses, the flute is designed to be held by the stem to help prevent the heat from the hand from warming the liquid inside. The bowl itself is designed in a manner to help retain the signature carbonation in the beverage. This is achieved by reducing the surface area at the opening of the bowl. Additionally, the flute design adds to the aesthetic appeal of champagne, allowing the bubbles to travel further due to the narrow design, giving a more pleasant visual appeal.

=== Sherry glass ===
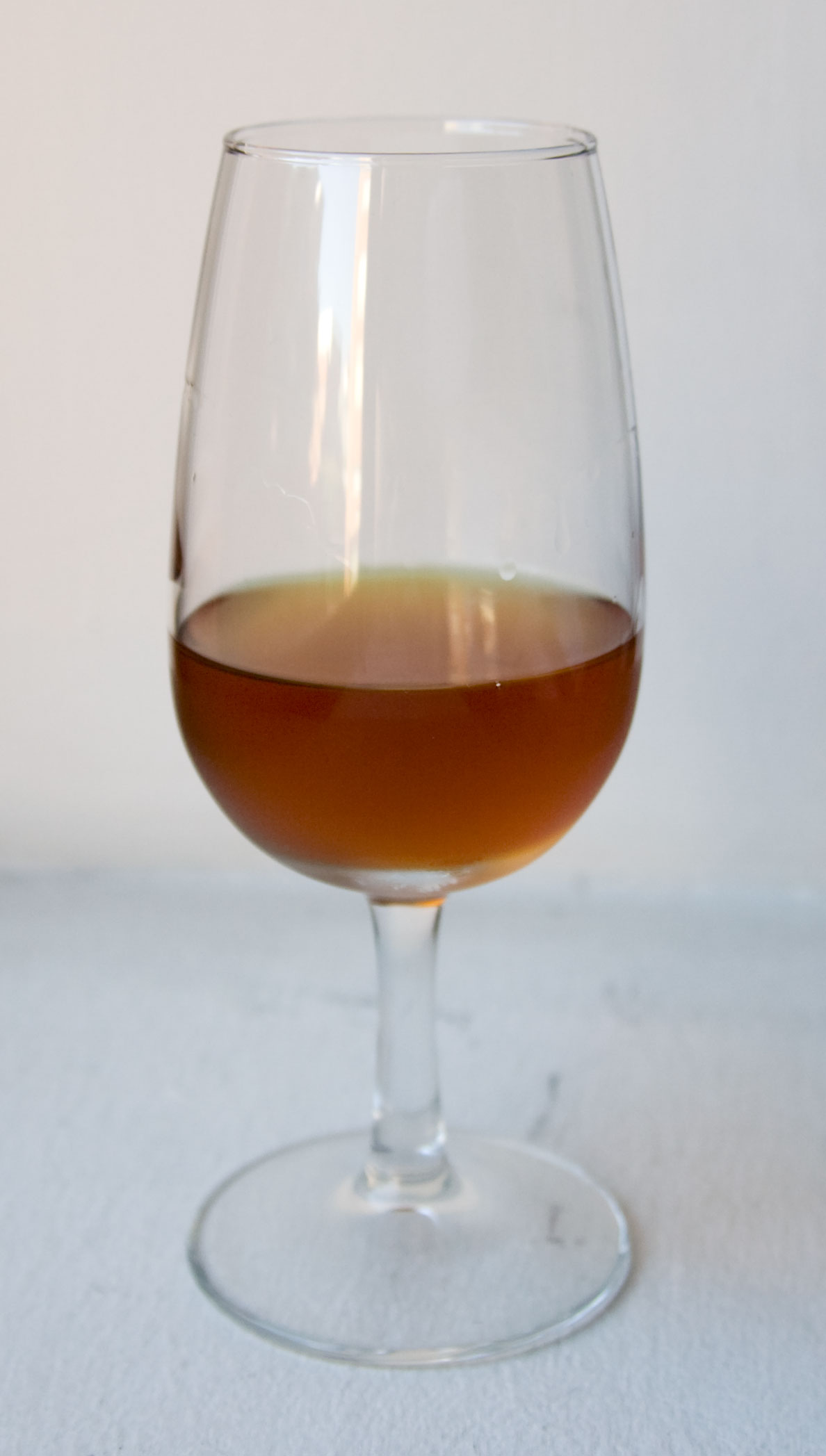
A sherry copita

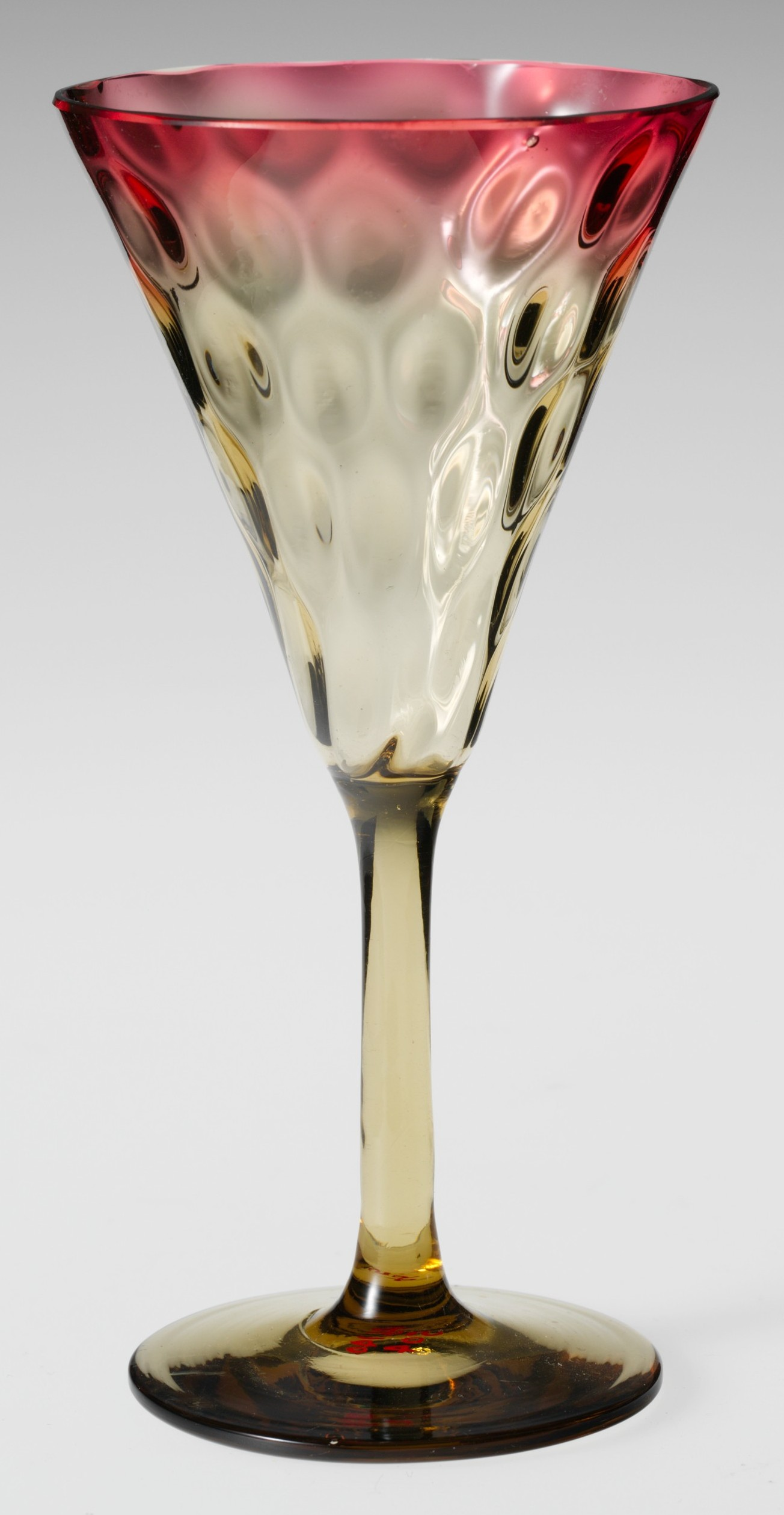
A sherry glass

A sherry glass or schooner is drinkware generally used for serving aromatic alcoholic beverages, such as sherry, port, aperitifs, and liqueurs, and layered shooters. The copita, with its aroma-enhancing narrow taper, is a type of sherry glass.

== Materials ==
High quality wine glasses once were made of lead glass, which has a higher index of refraction and is heavier than ordinary glass, but health concerns regarding the ingestion of lead resulted in their being replaced by lead-free glass. Wine glasses, with the exception of the hock glass, are generally not coloured or frosted as doing so would diminish appreciation of the wine's colour. There used to be a provisional ISO standard (ISO/PAS IWA 8:2009) for glass clarity and freedom from lead and other heavy metals, but it was withdrawn.

Some producers of high-end wine glasses such as Schott Zwiesel have pioneered methods of infusing titanium into the glass to increase its durability and reduce the likelihood of the glass breaking.

== Decoration ==
Cut glass, engraved glass and enamelled glass techniques have been widely used for wine glasses. In the 18th century, glass makers would draw spiral patterns in the stem as they made the glass. If they used air bubbles it was called an airtwist; if they used threads, either white or coloured, it would be called opaque twist.

Modern functional designs focus on aeration, such as glassmaker Kurt Josef Zalto's Josephinenhütte brand.

== ISO wine tasting glass ==
The International Organization for Standardization has a specification (ISO 3591:1977) for a wine-tasting glass. It consists of a cup (an "elongated egg") supported on a stem resting on a base.

INAO official wine tasting glass.

The glass of reference is the INAO wine glass, a tool defined by specifications of the French Association for Standardization (AFNOR), which was adopted by INAO as the official glass in 1970, received its standard AFNOR in June 1971 and its ISO 3591 standard in 1972. The INAO has not submitted a file at the National Institute of Industrial Property, it is therefore copied en masse and has gradually replaced other tasting glasses in the world.

The glass must be lead crystal (9% lead). Its dimensions give it a total volume between 210 millilitres (mL) and 225 mL, they are defined as follows:

- Diameter of the rim: 46 mm
- Calyx height: 100 mm
- Height of the foot: 55 mm
- Shoulder diameter: 65 mm
- Foot diameter: 9 mm
- Diameter of the base: 65 mm

The opening is narrower than the convex part so as to concentrate the bouquet. The capacity is approximately 215 ml, but it is intended to take a 50 ml pour. Some glasses of a similar shape, but with different capacities, may be loosely referred to as ISO glasses, but they form no part of the ISO specification.

== Measures in licensed premises ==
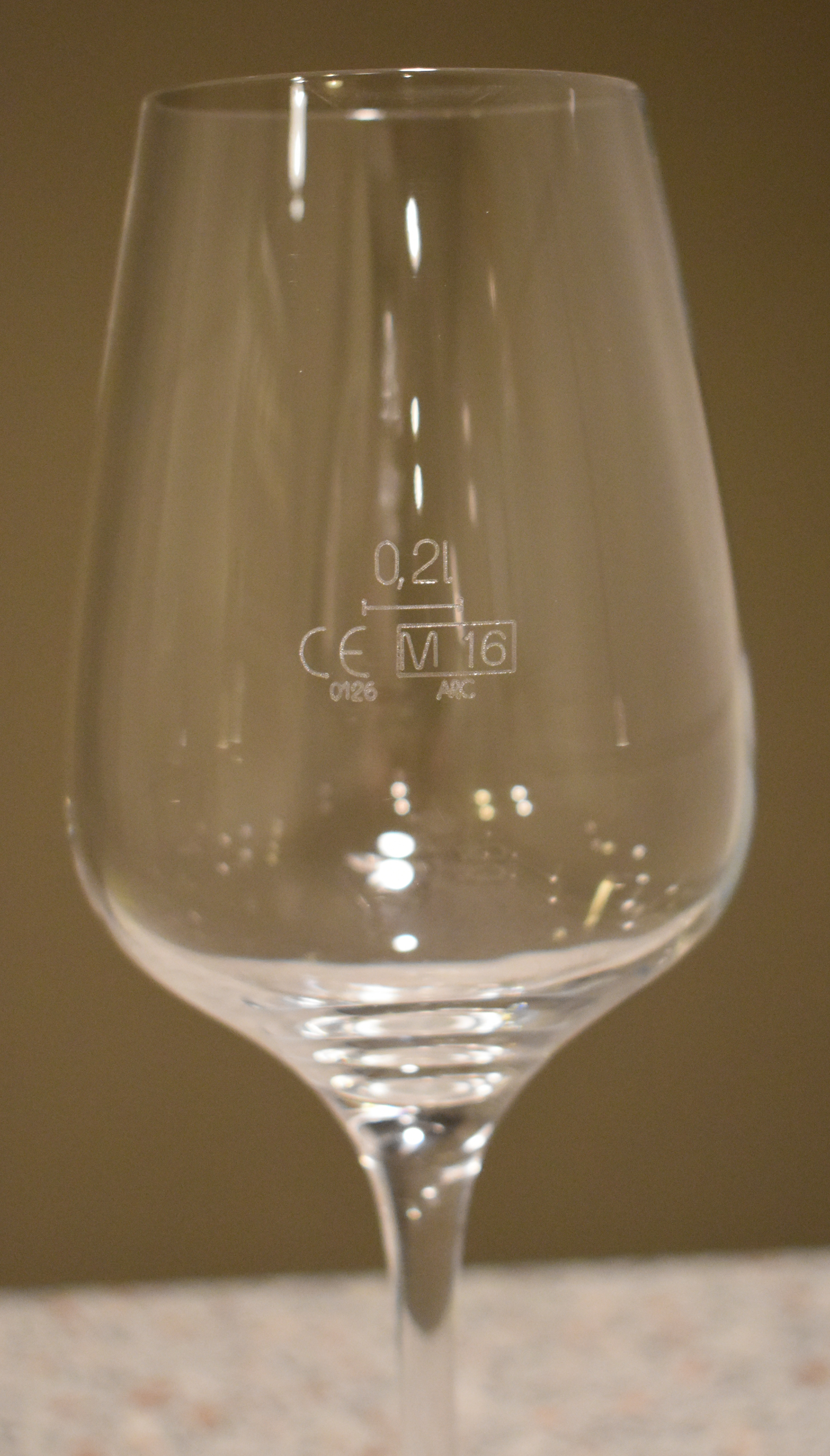
In the EU, fill lines are legally required on commercial glassware as a consumer protection measure.

In the UK many publicans have moved from serving wine in the standard size of 125mL, towards the larger size of 250mL. A code of practice, introduced in 2010 as an extension to the Licensing Act 2003, contains conditions for the sale of alcohol, including a requirement for customers to be informed that smaller measures are available.

In the United States, most laws governing alcohol exist at the state level. Federal law does not provide any guidance on a standard pour size, but 150 millilitres (5 US fl oz) is seen as typical for restaurants (one fifth of a standard 750 ml wine bottle), and with pour sizes for tastings typically being half as large.

== Capacity measure ==
As a supplemental unit of apothecary measure and as a culinary measurement unit, the wine glass (also known as wineglass, wineglassful (pl. wineglassesful), or cyathus vinarius in pharmaceutical Latin) is defined as 2 US customary fluid ounces (1/8 of a US customary pint; about 2·08 British imperial fluid ounces or 59·15mL) in the US and 2 British imperial fluid ounces (1/10 of a British imperial pint; about 1·92 US customary fluid ounces or 56·83mL) in the UK. An older version (before c. 1800) was 1 1/2 fluid ounces. These units bear little relation to the capacity of most contemporary wineglasses (based on 1/6 bottle, or 125mL; about 4·40 British imperial fluid ounces or 4·23 US customary fluid ounces) or to the ancient Roman cyathus (about 45mL, 1·58 British imperial fluid ounces, or 1·52 US customary fluid ounces).

In the UK, the wine glass, the tumbler (10 British imperial fluid ounces), the breakfast cup (8 British imperial fluid ounces), the cup (6 British imperial fluid ounces), the teacup (5 British imperial fluid ounces), and the coffee cup (2 1/2 British imperial fluid ounces) are the traditional British equivalents of the US customary cup and the metric cup, used in situations where a US cook would use the US customary cup and a cook using metric units the metric cup. The breakfast cup is the most similar in size to the US customary cup and the metric cup. Which of these six units is used depends on the quantity or volume of the ingredient: there is division of labour between these six units, like the tablespoon and the teaspoon. British cookery books and recipes, especially those from the days before the UK’s partial metrication, commonly use two or more of the aforesaid units simultaneously: for example, the same recipe may call for a ‘tumblerful’ of one ingredient and a ‘wineglassful’ of another one; or a ‘breakfastcupful’ or ‘cupful’ of one ingredient, a ‘teacupful’ of a second one, and a ‘coffeecupful’ of a third one. Unlike the US customary cup and the metric cup, a tumbler, a breakfast cup, a cup, a teacup, a coffee cup, and a wine glass are not measuring cups: they are simply everyday drinking vessels commonly found in British households and typically having the respective aforementioned capacities; due to long‑term and widespread use, they have been transformed into measurement units for cooking. There is not a British imperial unit–based culinary measuring cup.

1 wine glass	=	2	British imperial fluid ounces
	=	1/5	tumbler
	=	1/4	breakfast cup
	=	1/3	cup
	=	2/5	teacup
	=	4/5	coffee cup
	=	1/10	British imperial pint
	≈	1·92	US customary fluid ounces
	≈	0·24	US customary cup
	≈	56·83	millilitres
	≈	0·23	metric cup

== See also ==
- Decanter
- Wine accessory
- Glass harp
- Tumbler (glass)#Culinary measurement unit
- Breakfast cup
- Cup (unit)#British cup
- Teacup (unit)
- Coffee cup (unit)
- Cooking weights and measures
