= Coffee cup (unit) =

Culinary measurement unit

The coffee cup is a culinary measurement unit in the United Kingdom. It is named after a small cup for serving after‑dinner coffee. 1 coffee cup is 2 1/2 British imperial fluid ounces.

Five British culinary measurement units are related to the coffee cup: the tumbler (10 British imperial fluid ounces), the breakfast cup (8 British imperial fluid ounces), the cup (6 British imperial fluid ounces), the teacup (5 British imperial fluid ounces), and the wine glass (2 British imperial fluid ounces).

1 coffee cup	=	2 1/2	British imperial fluid ounces
	=	1/4	tumbler
	=	5/16	breakfast cup
	=	5/12	cup
	=	1/2	teacup
	=	1 1/4	wine glasses
	=	1/8	British imperial pint
	≈	2 2/5	US customary fluid ounces
	≈	0·3	US customary cup
	≈	71·03	millilitres
	≈	0·28	metric cup

All six units are the traditional British equivalents of the US customary cup and the metric cup, used in situations where a US cook would use the US customary cup and a cook using metric units the metric cup. The breakfast cup is the most similar in size to the US customary and metric cups. Which of these six units is used depends on the quantity or volume of the ingredient: there is division of labour between these six units, like the tablespoon and the teaspoon. British cookery books and recipes, especially those from the days before the UK's partial metrication, commonly use two or more of the units above simultaneously: for example, the same recipe may call for a 'tumblerful' of one ingredient and a 'wineglassful' of another one; or a 'breakfastcupful' or 'cupful' of one ingredient, a 'teacupful' of a second one, and a 'coffeecupful' of a third one. Unlike the US customary cup and the metric cup, a tumbler, a breakfast cup, a cup, a teacup, a coffee cup, and a wine glass are not measuring cups: they are simply everyday drinking vessels commonly found in British households and typically having the respective aforementioned capacities; due to long-term and widespread use, they have been transformed into measurement units for cooking. There is no British imperial unit–based culinary measuring cup.

== See also ==
- Tumbler (glass)#Culinary measurement unit
- Breakfast cup
- Cup (unit)#British cup
- Teacup (unit)
- Wine glass#Capacity measure
- Cooking weights and measures
