= Measuring cup =

Kitchen utensil to measure volume of cooking ingredients

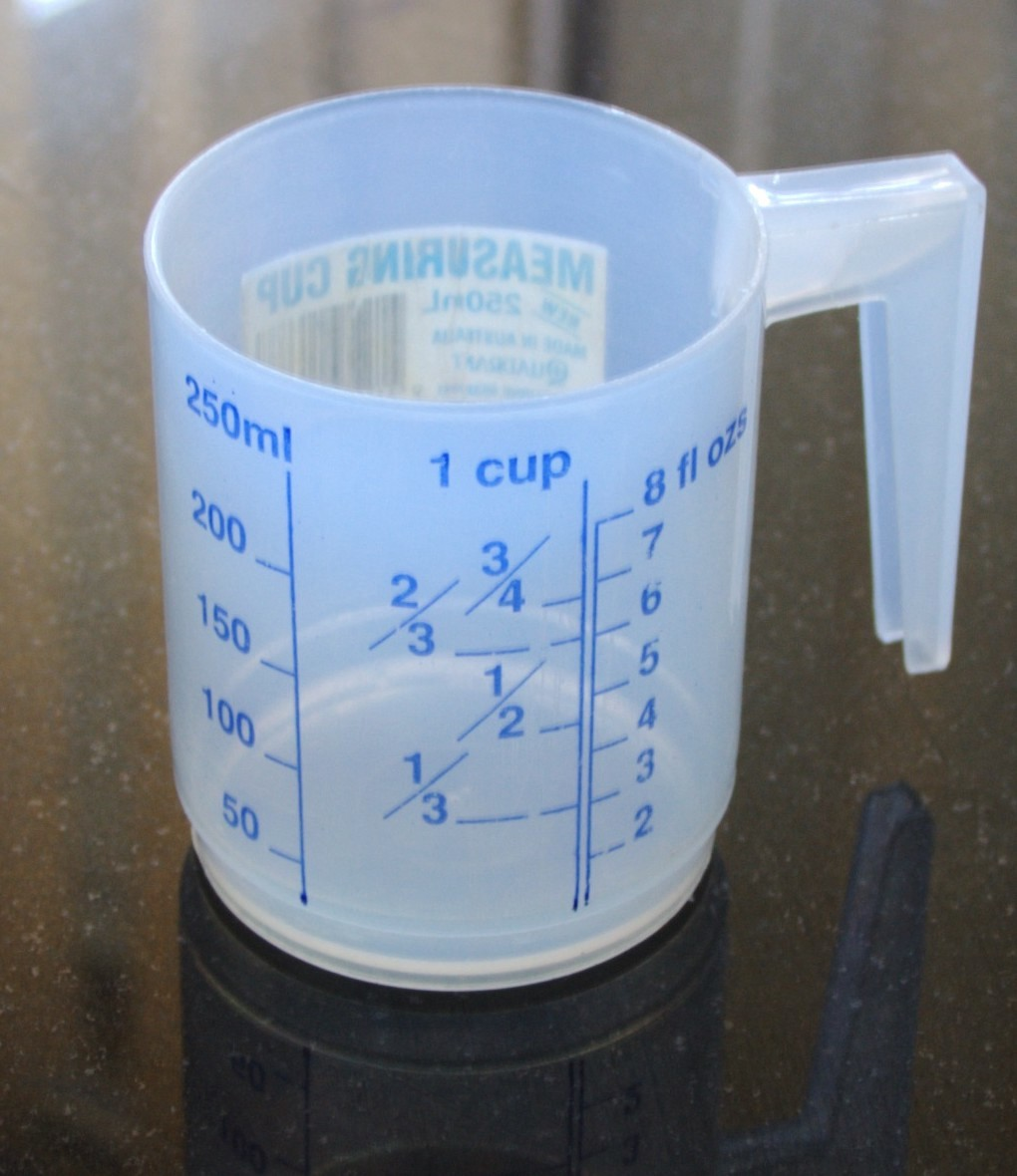
A simple plastic measuring cup, capable of holding the volume one cup

A measuring cup is a kitchen utensil used primarily to measure the volume of liquid or bulk solid cooking ingredients such as flour and sugar, especially for volumes from about 50 mL (approx. 2 fl oz) upwards. Measuring cups are also used to measure washing powder, liquid detergents and bleach for clothes washing. Some measuring cups will have a scale marked in cups and fractions of a cup, and often with fluid measure and weight of a selection of dry foodstuffs. Others are made to a specific capacity and are designed to be filled to the top with dry ingredients.

Measuring cups may be made of plastic, glass, or metal. Transparent (or translucent) cups can be read from an external scale; metal ones only from a dipstick or scale marked on the inside.

== Capacity and scale ==
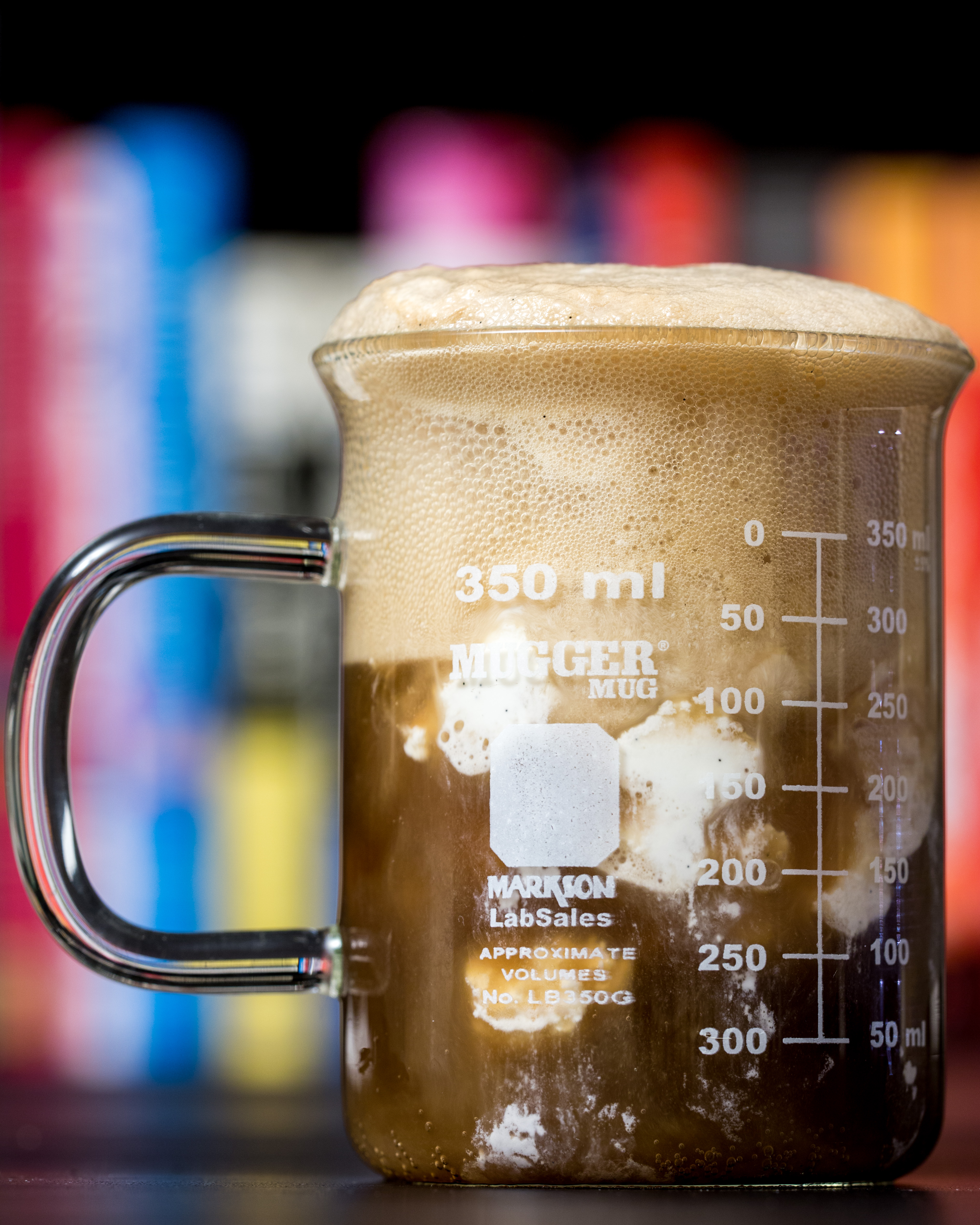
A mug that has markings up to 350 ml

Measuring cups usually have capacities from 250 mL (1 metric cup) to 1,000 mL (4 metric cups; about 2·11 US customary pints (1·06 US customary quarts) or 1·76 British imperial pints (0·88 British imperial quart)), though larger sizes are also available for commercial use. They usually have scale markings at different heights: the substance being measured is added to the cup until it reaches the wanted level. Dry measure cups without a scale are sometimes used, in sets typically of 1/4, 1/3, 1/2, and 1 cup. The units may be milliliters or fractions of a liter, or the cup (unit, with varying definitions) with its fractions (typically 1/4, 1/3, 1/2, 2/3, and 3/4), pints, and often fluid ounces. Dry measure cups are distinguished from liquid measure cups in that they are meant to be filled to the top so that excess may be scraped off and shallow for easy cleaning. Liquid measure cups tend to be microwave safe for heating and clear to more easily judge the meniscus.

Sometimes multiples of teaspoons and tablespoons are included. There may also be scales for the approximate weight for particular substances, such as flour and sugar.

== For dry measure ==
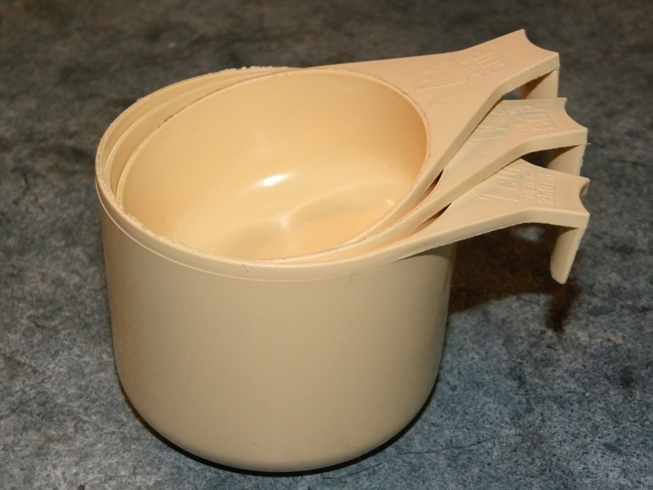
A set of plastic measuring cups which usually include one full cup measure, half a cup and one-third of a cup

Many dry ingredients, such as granulated sugar, are not very compressible, so volume measures are consistent. Others, notably flour, are more variable. For example, 1 cup of all-purpose flour sifted into a cup and leveled weighs about 100 grams (3½ oz), whereas 1 cup of all-purpose flour scooped from its container and leveled weighs about 140 grams (5 oz).

Using a measuring cup to measure bulk foods which can be compressed to a variable degree such as chopped vegetables or shredded cheese leads to large measurement uncertainties. In cooking disciplines such as baking, where accurate measurements are important, ingredients are instead measured by weight.

== See also ==
- Measuring spoon
- Cup (unit)
- Kitchen scale
- Spoon scale
- Graduated cylinder
