= Tumbler (glass) =

Beverage container made of plastic, glass or stainless steel

An oversized tumbler for serving chilled beverages, while reducing the need to frequently refill the glass

A tumbler is a flat-floored beverage container usually made of plastic, glass or stainless steel.

Theories vary as to the etymology of the word tumbler. One such theory is that the glass originally had a pointed or convex base and could not be set down without spilling. Another is that they had weighted bottoms which caused them to right themselves if knocked over.

The modern tumbler comes in various sizes and shapes, designed to accommodate a wide range of beverages from water and juice to sophisticated cocktails.

== Types of tumblers ==
- Dizzy Cocktail glass, a glass with a wide, shallow bowl, comparable to a normal cocktail glass but without the stem
- Collins glass, for a tall mixed drink
- Highball glass, for mixed drinks
- Iced tea glass
- Juice glass, for fruit juices and vegetable juices.
- Old fashioned glass, traditionally, for a simple cocktail or liquor "on the rocks". Contemporary American "rocks" glasses may be much larger, and used for a variety of beverages over ice
- Shot glass, a small glass for up to four ounces of liquor. The modern shot glass has a thicker base and sides than the older whiskey glass
- Table glass, faceted glass, or granyonyi stakan, common in Russia and made of particularly hard and thick glass
- Water glass
- Whiskey tumbler, a small, thin-walled glass for a straight shot of liquor

== Culinary measurement unit ==
The tumbler is a measurement unit for cooking in the United Kingdom. 1 tumbler is 10 British imperial fluid ounces (1/2 British imperial pint; about 9.61 US customary fluid ounces or 284.13 millilitres).

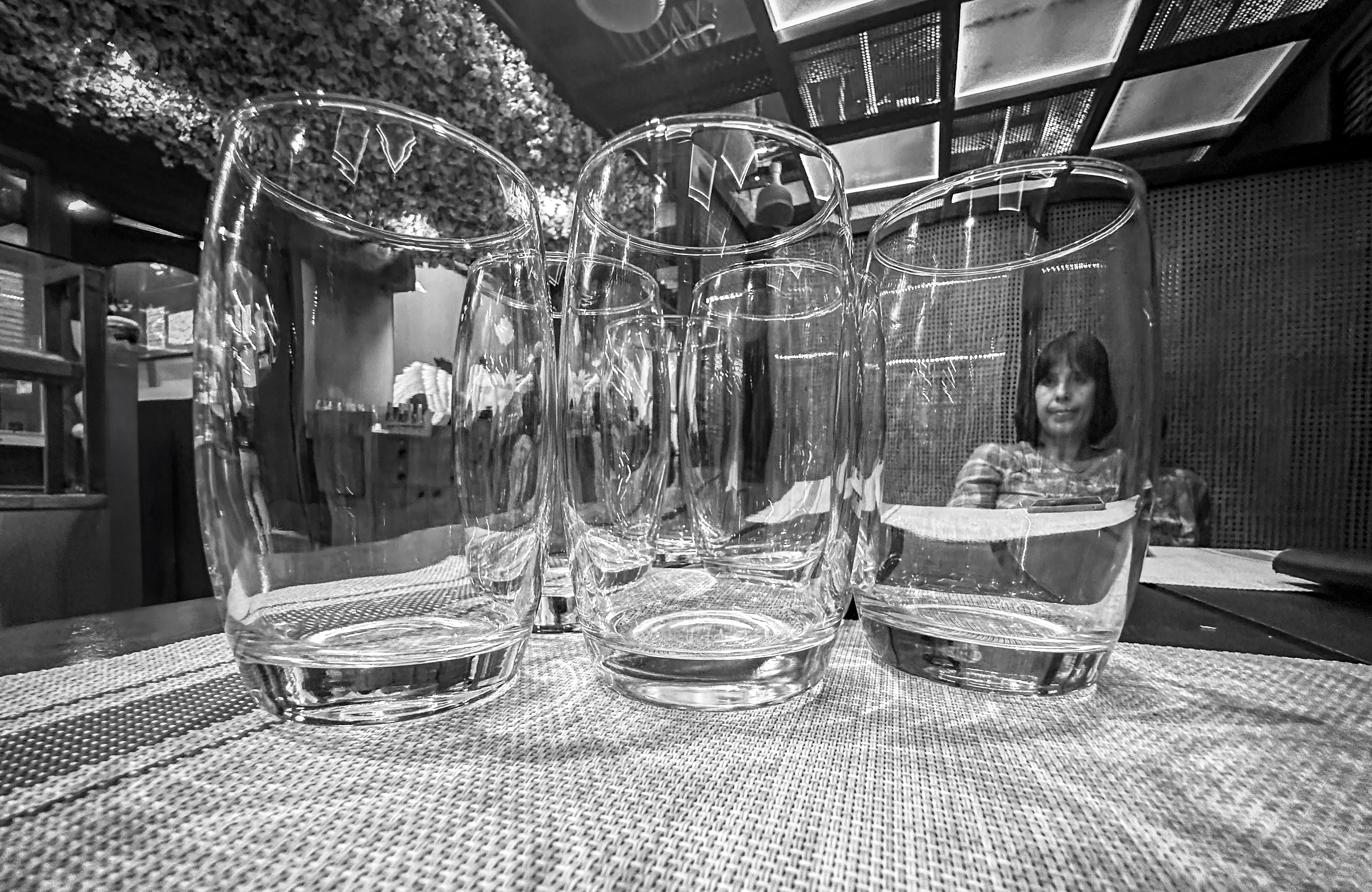
Rounded Tumblers

The tumbler, the breakfast cup (8 British imperial fluid ounces), the cup (6 British imperial fluid ounces), the teacup (5 British imperial fluid ounces), the coffee cup (2 1/2 British imperial fluid ounces), and the wine glass (2 British imperial fluid ounces) are the traditional British equivalents of the US customary cup and the metric cup, used in situations where a US cook would use the US customary cup and a cook using metric units the metric cup. The breakfast cup is the most similar in size to the US customary cup and the metric cup. Which of these six units is used depends on the quantity or volume of the ingredient: there is division of labour between these six units, like the tablespoon and the teaspoon. British cookery books and recipes, especially those from the days before the UK's partial metrication, commonly use two or more of the aforesaid units simultaneously: for example, the same recipe may call for a "tumblerful" of one ingredient and a "wineglassful" of another one; or a "breakfastcupful" or "cupful" of one ingredient, a "teacupful" of a second one, and a "coffeecupful" of a third one. Unlike the US customary cup and the metric cup, a tumbler, a breakfast cup, a cup, a teacup, a coffee cup, and a wine glass are not measuring cups: they are simply everyday drinking vessels commonly found in British households and typically having the respective aforementioned capacities; due to long‑term and widespread use, they have been transformed into measurement units for cooking. There is not a British imperial unit–based culinary measuring cup.

1 tumbler	=	10	British imperial fluid ounces
	=	1 1/4	breakfast cups
	=	1 2/3	cups
	=	2	teacups
	=	4	coffee cups
	=	5	wine glasses
	=	1/2	British imperial pint
	≈	9.61	US customary fluid ounces
	≈	1.2	US customary cups
	≈	284.13	millilitres
	≈	1.14	metric cups

== See also ==
- Breakfast cup
- Cup (unit)#British cup
- Teacup (unit)
- Coffee cup (unit)
- Wine glass#Capacity measure
- Cooking weights and measures
