= Cutlery =

Eating utensils

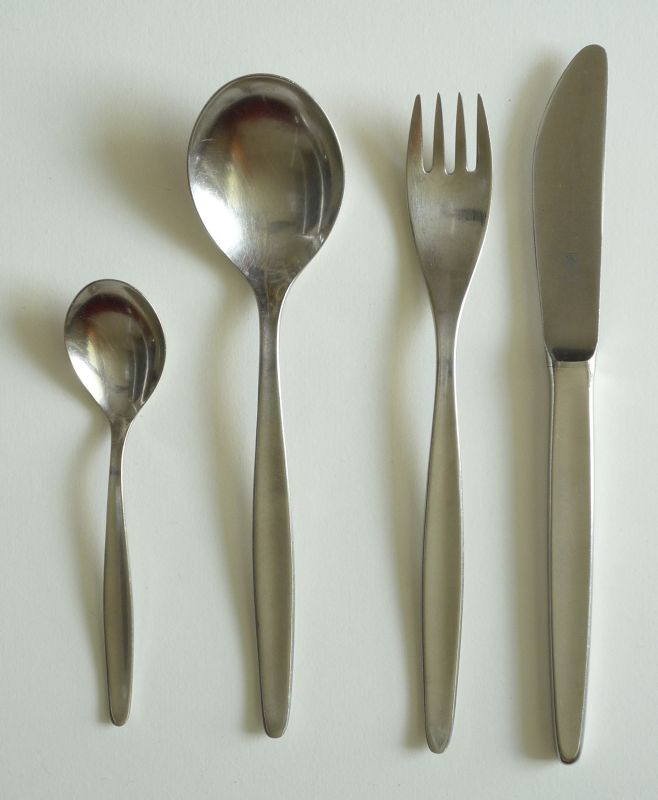
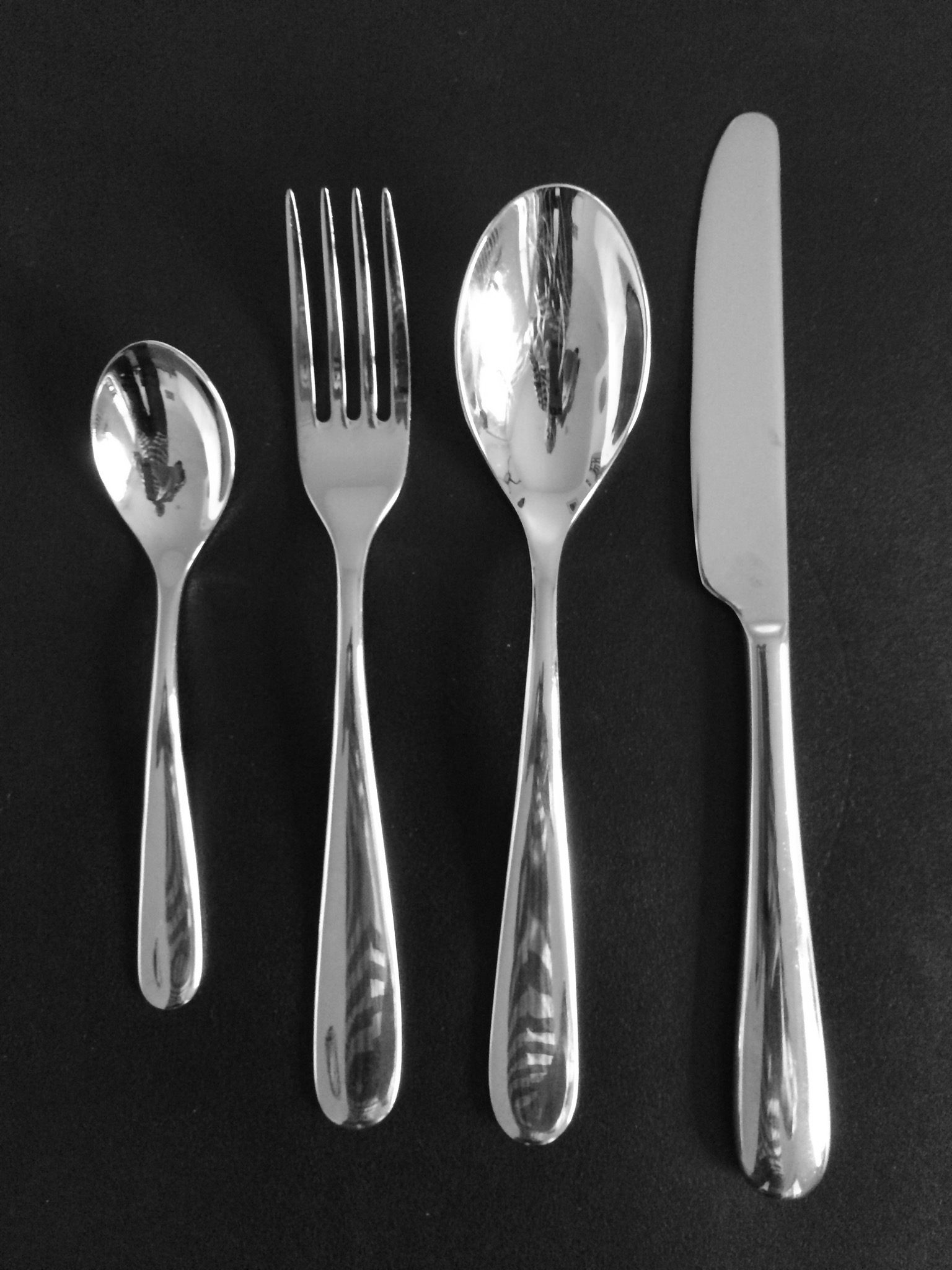
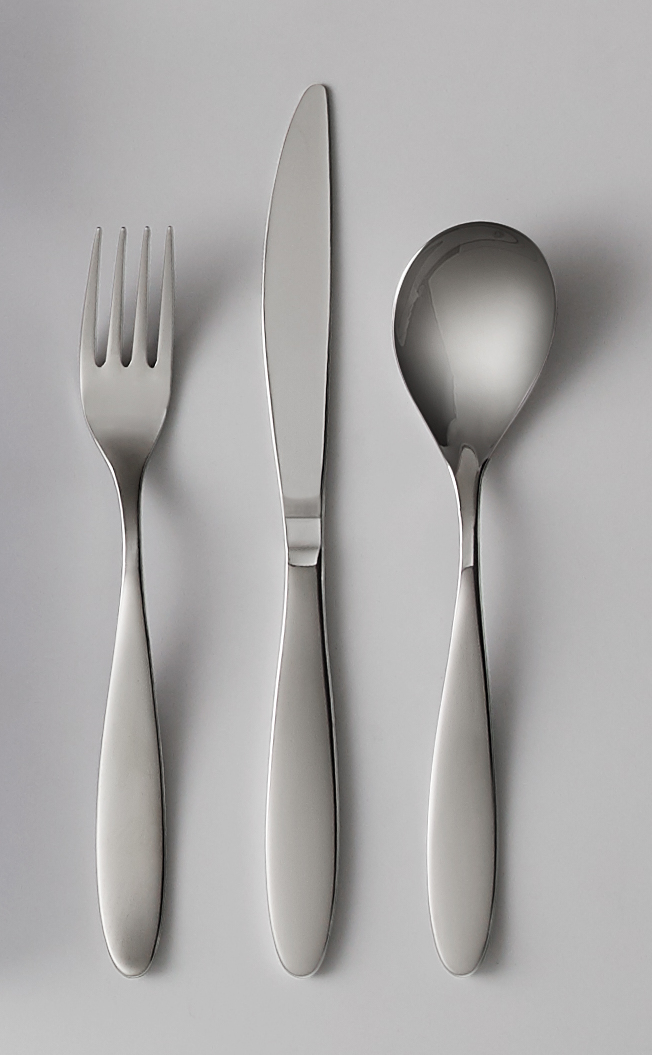
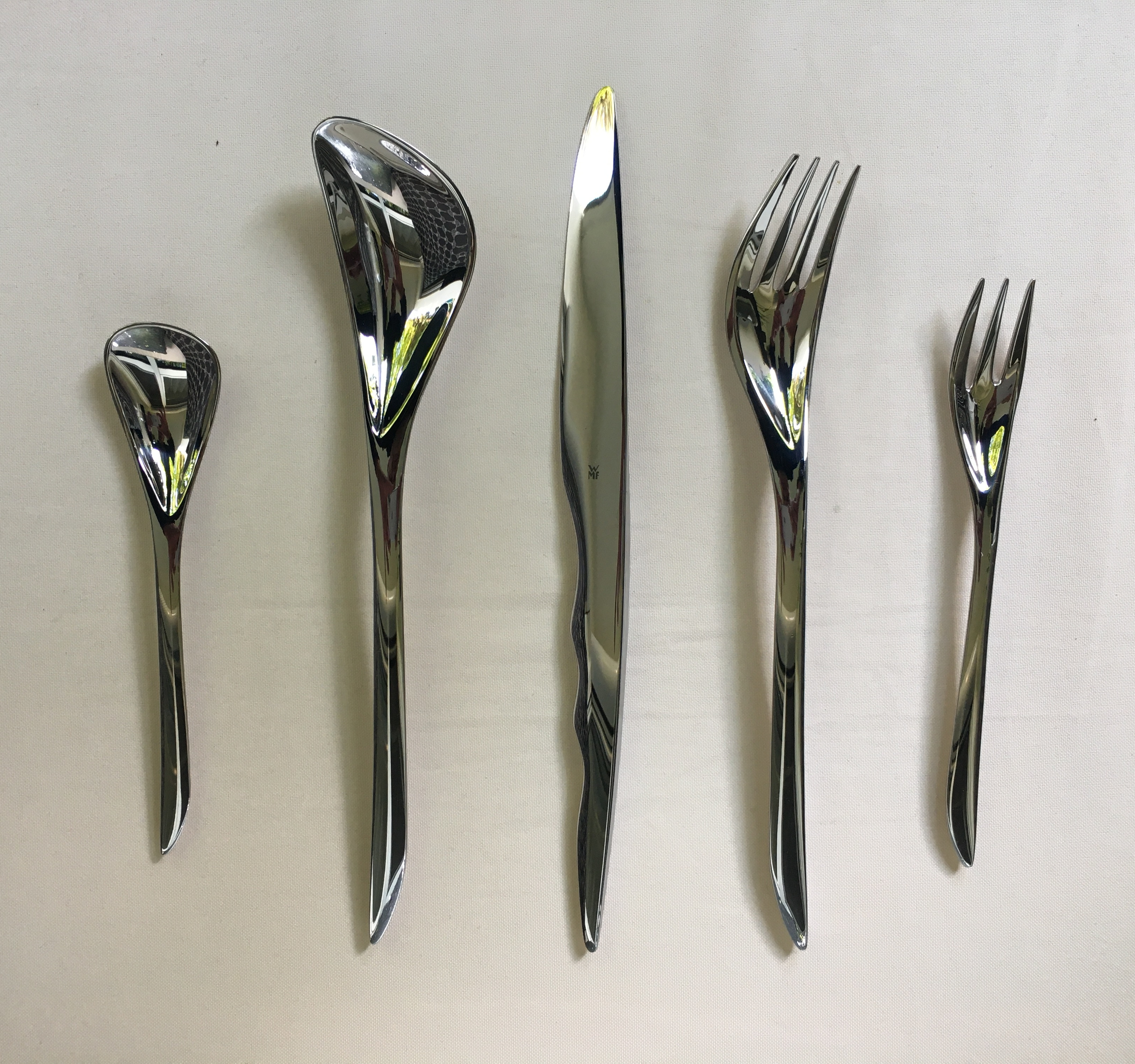
Four visions of contemporary cutlery design in stainless steel (from left to right): Stockholm cutlery designed by Kurt Mayer for WMF, (1960s); Nuovo Milano by Ettore Sottsass, (1987); Mami by Stefano Giovannoni, (1993) both for Alessi; and a design by Zaha Hadid for WMF (2007)

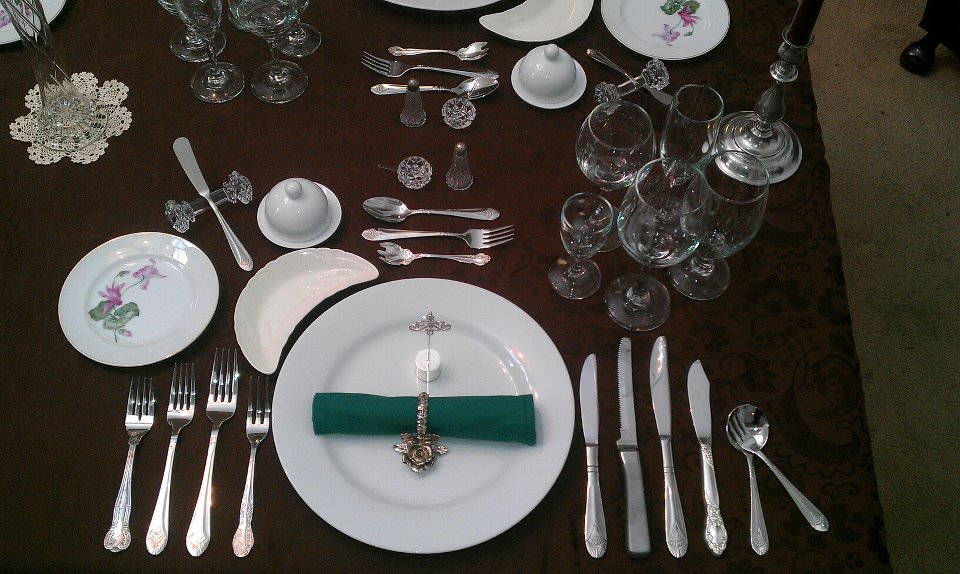
A table setting for an eight-course meal, including a butter knife resting on a crystal stand, a cocktail fork, soup spoon, dessert fork, dessert spoon, and an ice cream fork, as well as separate knives and forks for fish, entrée, main course, and salad

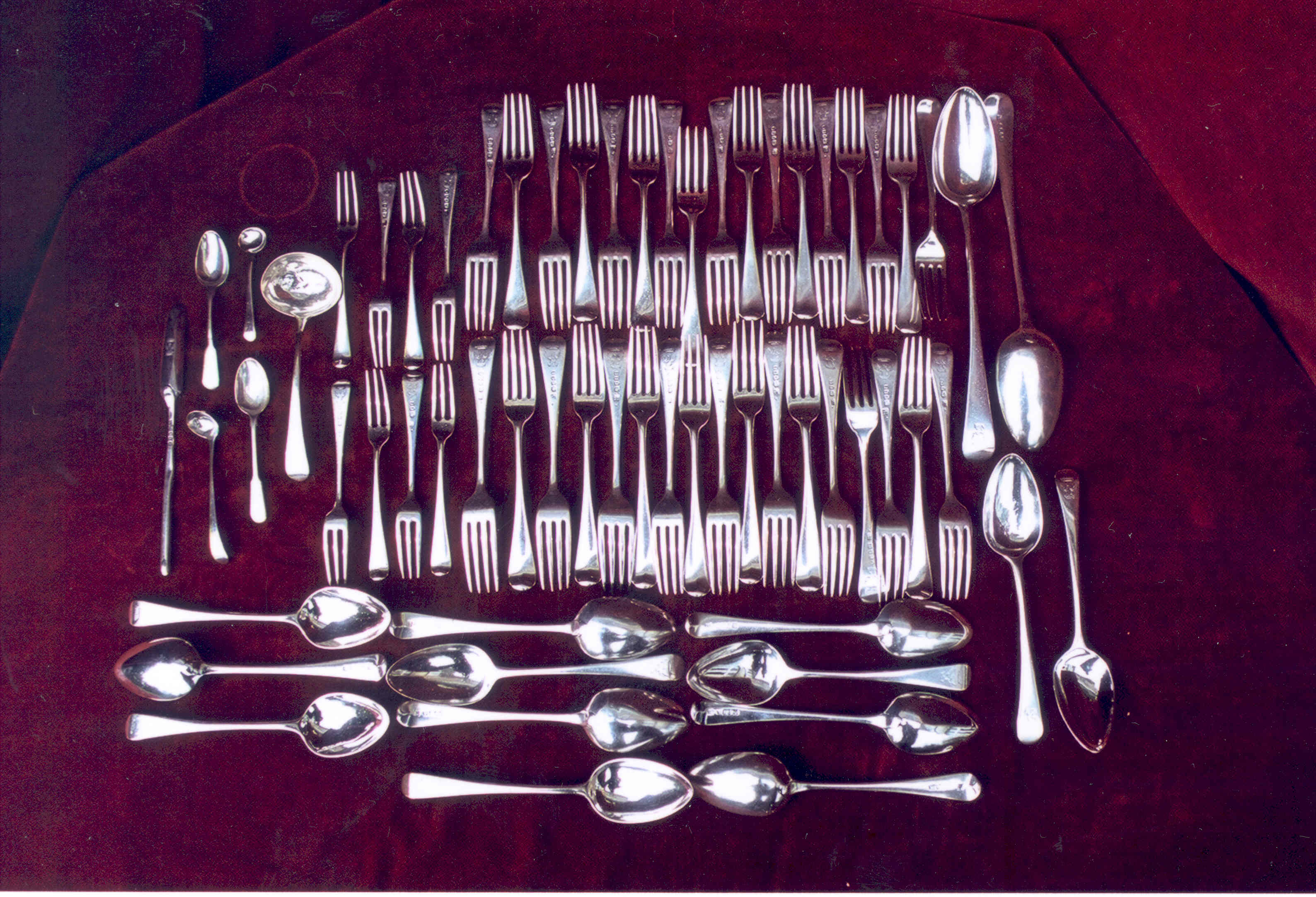
A set (known as a canteen) of Georgian era silver cutlery, including ladles, and serving spoons. The thin item on the left is a marrow scoop for eating bone marrow

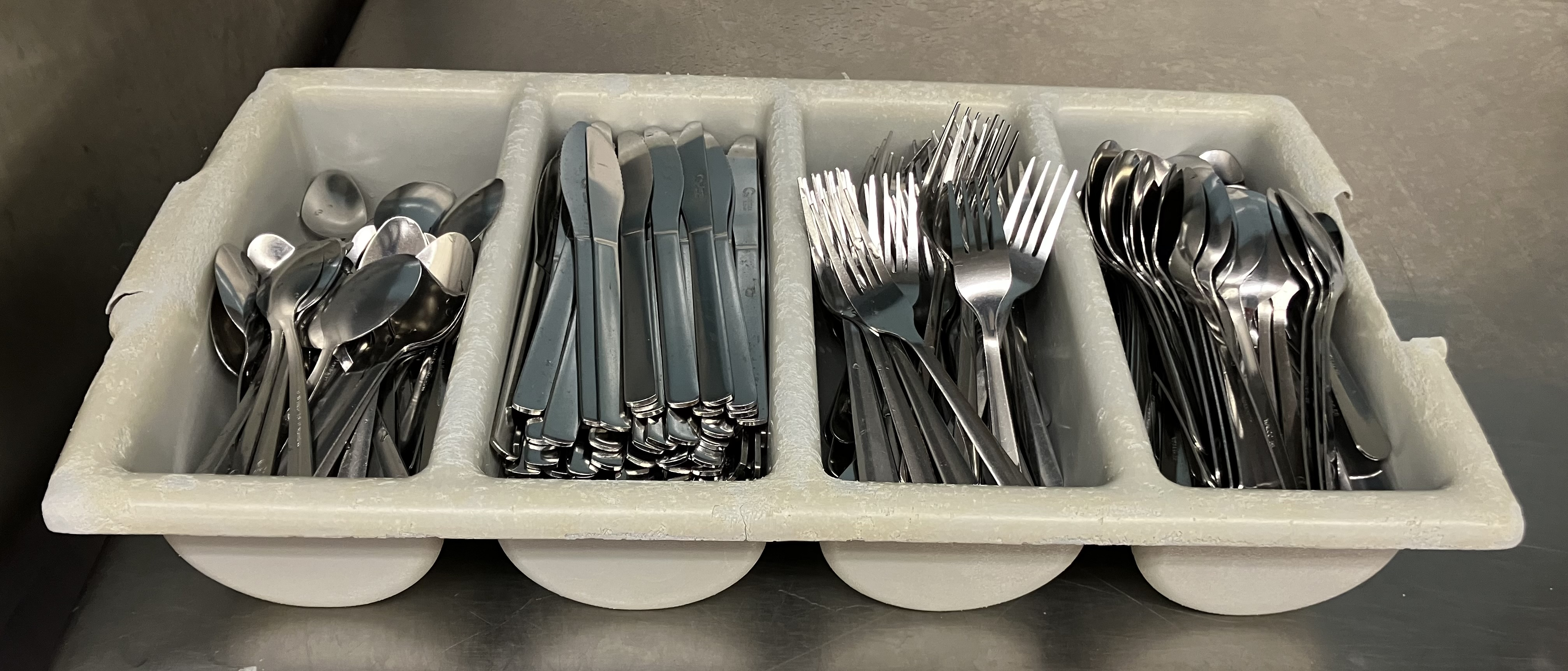
Cutlery as typically presented for use in a self-service cafeteria or canteen

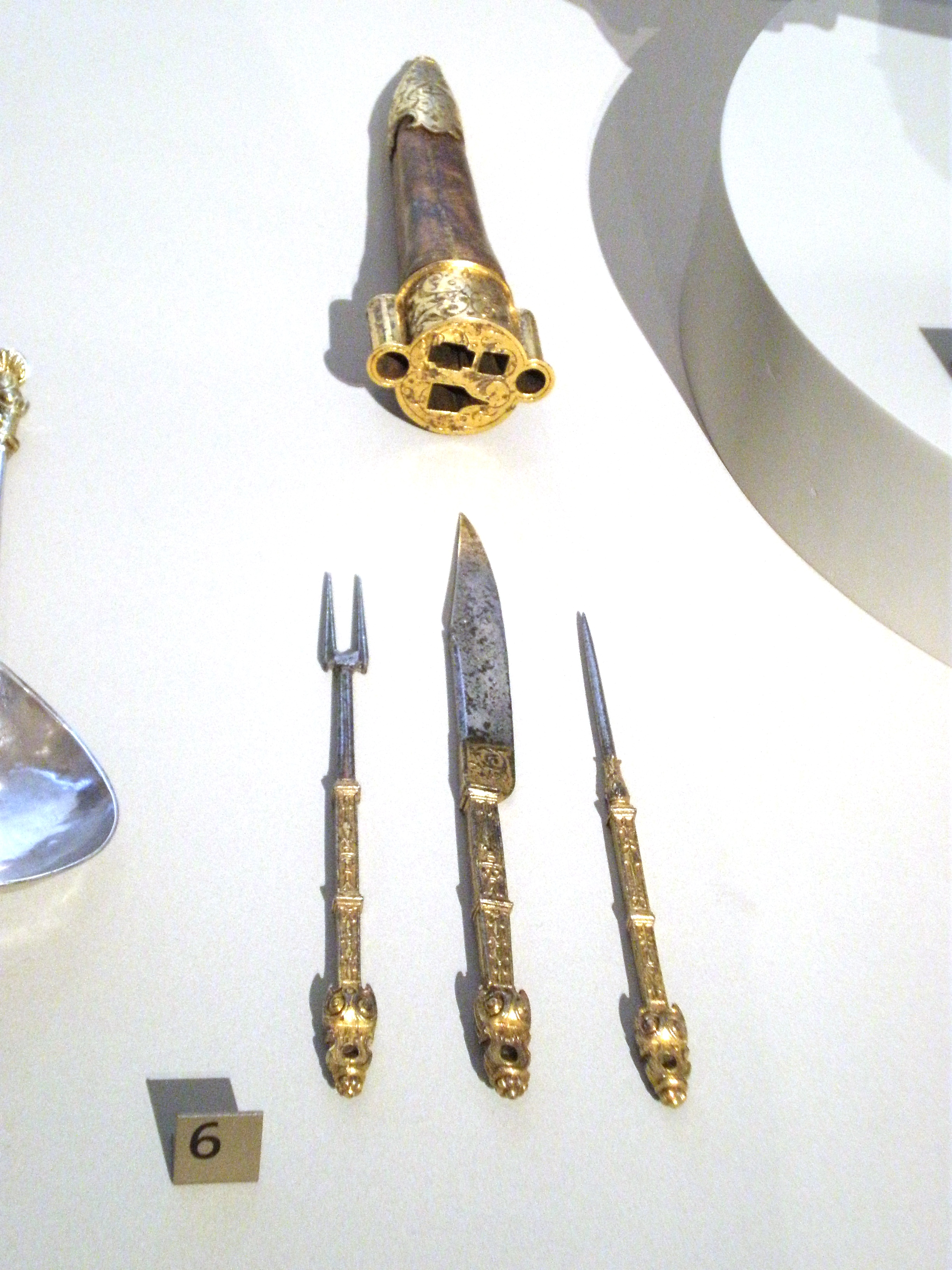
Set of French travelling cutlery in the Victoria and Albert Museum (1550–1600)

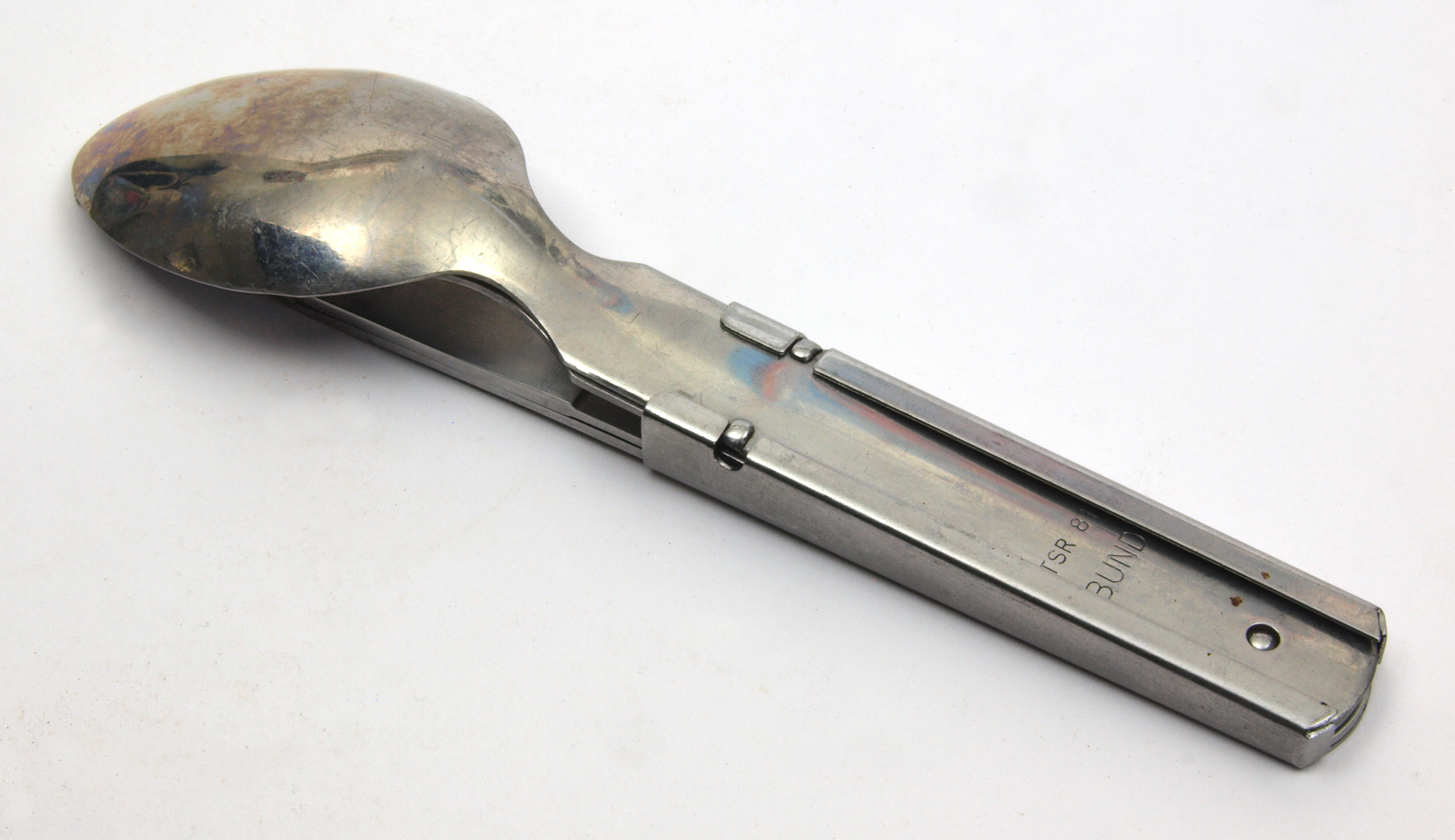
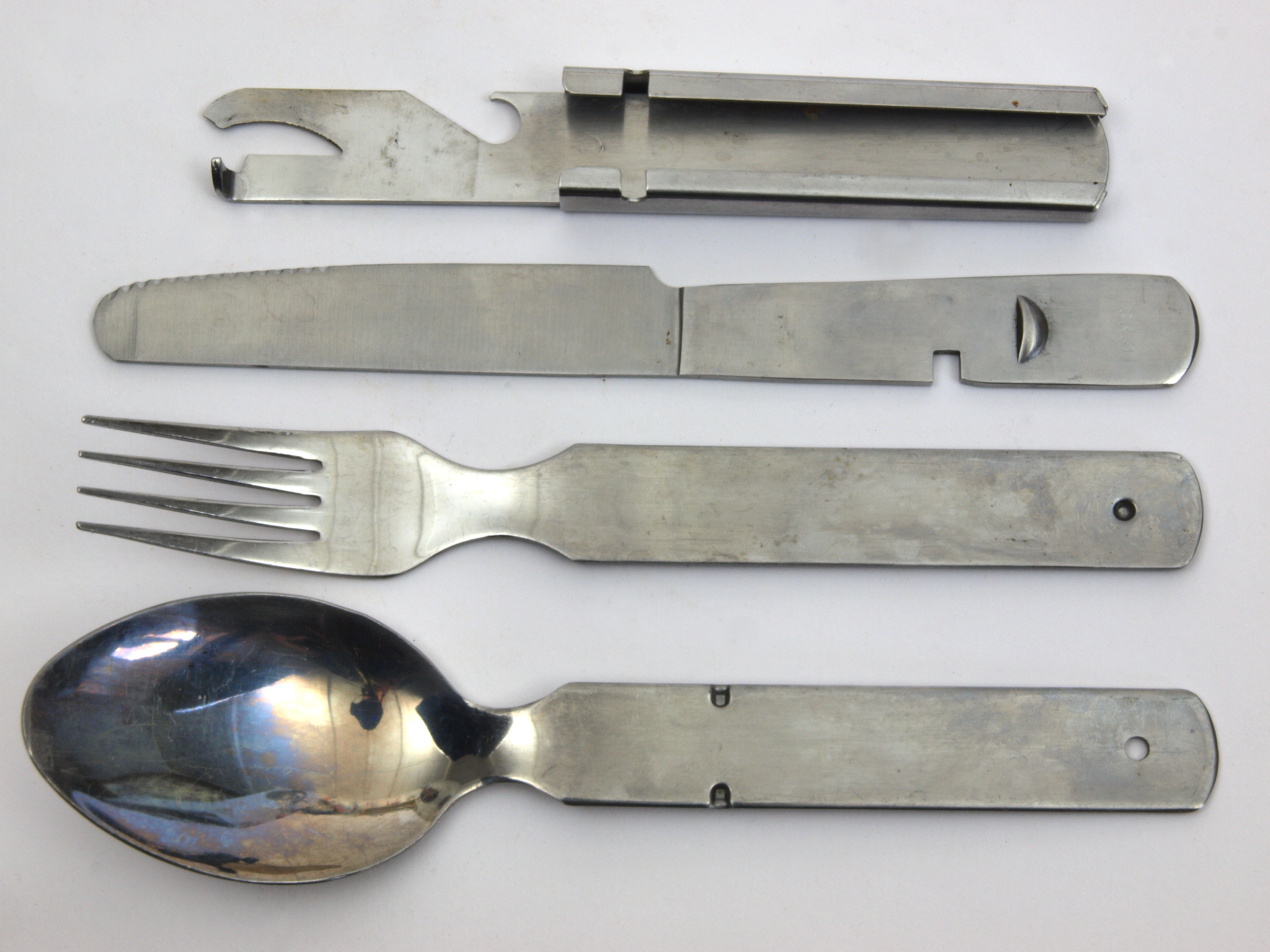
TS 81 stainless steel field cutlery made for the German armed forces (1980s)

Cutlery are utensils used for serving and eating food at the dining table — originally referring to just knives, whereas forks and spoons were silverware — all part of flatware (American English) or tableware, these both encompassing crockery as well. These three implements first appeared together on tables as a set in Britain in the Georgian era. A collected set of silverware is called a canteen of cutlery, typically referring to the polished wooden compartmental case in which they are stored.

The city of Sheffield in Yorkshire, England has been famous for the production of cutlery since the 17th century. An express passenger train – the Master Cutler – running from Sheffield to London was named after the industry. The development of cheap and mass-produced stainless steel in Sheffield in the early 20th century brought affordable cutlery to the masses.

Sheffield's counterparts are Thiers, Puy-de-Dôme in the Auvergne of France and Solingen in the Northern Rhineland of Germany.

== Etymology ==
The word cutlery derives from the Middle English word 'cuteler' and this in turn derives from Old French "coutelier" which comes from "coutel"; meaning knife (modern French: couteau). The word's early origins can be seen in the Latin word 'culter' (knife), still retained in the agricultural tool of a coulter.

A person who makes or sells cutlery is called a cutler. While most cutlers were historically men, women could be cutlers too; Agnes Cotiller was working as a cutler in London in 1346, and training a woman apprentice, known as Juseana.

== Industry ==
At Sheffield the trade of cutler became divided, with allied trades such as razormaker, awl bladesmith, shearsmith and forkmaker emerging and becoming distinct trades by the 18th century.

Before the mid 19th century when cheap mild steel became available due to new methods of steelmaking, knives (and other edged tools) were made by welding a strip of steel on to the piece of iron that was to be formed into a knife, or sandwiching a strip of steel between two pieces of iron. This was done because steel was then a much more expensive commodity than iron. Modern blades are sometimes laminated, but for a different reason. Since the hardest steel is brittle, a layer of hard steel may be laid between two layers of a milder, less brittle steel, for a blade that keeps a sharp edge well, and is less likely to break in service.

After fabrication, the knife had to be sharpened, originally on a grindstone, but from the late medieval period in a blade mill or (as they were known in the Sheffield region) a cutlers wheel.

== Components ==
Originally, a set of cutlery was a basic collection of a knife, fork, and spoon — as it remains today, along with a teaspoon — but over the years the range has diversified, so that a canteen of cutlery will have a dozen or more different components to make a place setting. Diversification has been at its most extreme with spoons.

- Knives:
  - Table knife
  - Steak knife
  - Fish knife
  - Dessert knife
  - Fruit knife
  - Butter knife
- Forks:
  - Table fork
  - Fish fork
  - Dessert fork
  - Cake fork
- Other:
  - Chopsticks
- Spoons:
  - Tablespoon / serving spoon
  - Soup spoon
  - Dessert spoon
  - Teaspoon
  - Coffee spoon
  - Demitasse spoon
  - Egg spoon
  - Salt spoon
  - Sugar spoon
  - Sundae / parfait spoon
  - Slotted spoon
  - Ladle

Over the years, various hybrid versions of cutlery as combination eating utensils have been made by blending the functionality of different implements, usually with portmanteau names, including the spork (spoon / fork), spife (spoon / knife), and knork (knife / fork). The sporf or splayd combines all three.

== Composition ==
=== Metallic ===
Sterling silver is the traditional material from which good quality cutlery is made. Historically, silver had the advantage over other metals of being less chemically reactive. Chemical reactions between certain foods and the cutlery metal can lead to unpleasant tastes. Gold is even less reactive than silver, but the use of gold cutlery was confined to the exceptionally wealthy, such as monarchs.

Steel was always used for more utilitarian knives, and pewter was used for some cheaper items, especially spoons. From the 19th century, electroplated nickel silver (EPNS) was used as a cheaper substitute for sterling silver.

In 1913, the British metallurgist Harry Brearley discovered stainless steel by chance, bringing affordable cutlery to the masses. This metal has come to be the predominant one used in cutlery. An alternative is melchior, corrosion-resistant nickel and copper alloy, which can also sometimes contain manganese and nickel-iron.

Titanium has also been used to make cutlery for its lower thermal conductivity and considerable weight savings compared to steel, with uses in camping.

=== Disposable cutlery ===
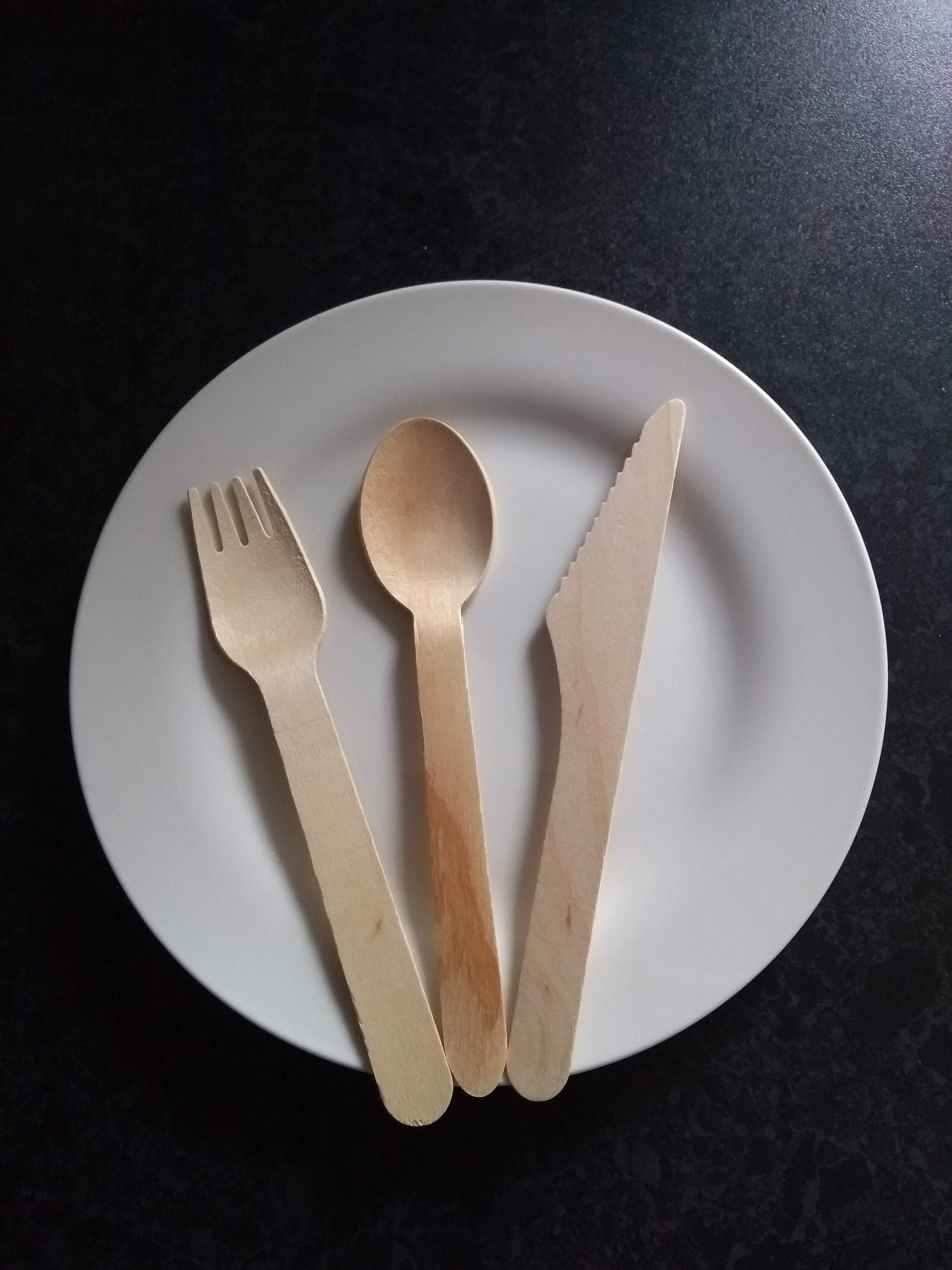
Wooden cutlery

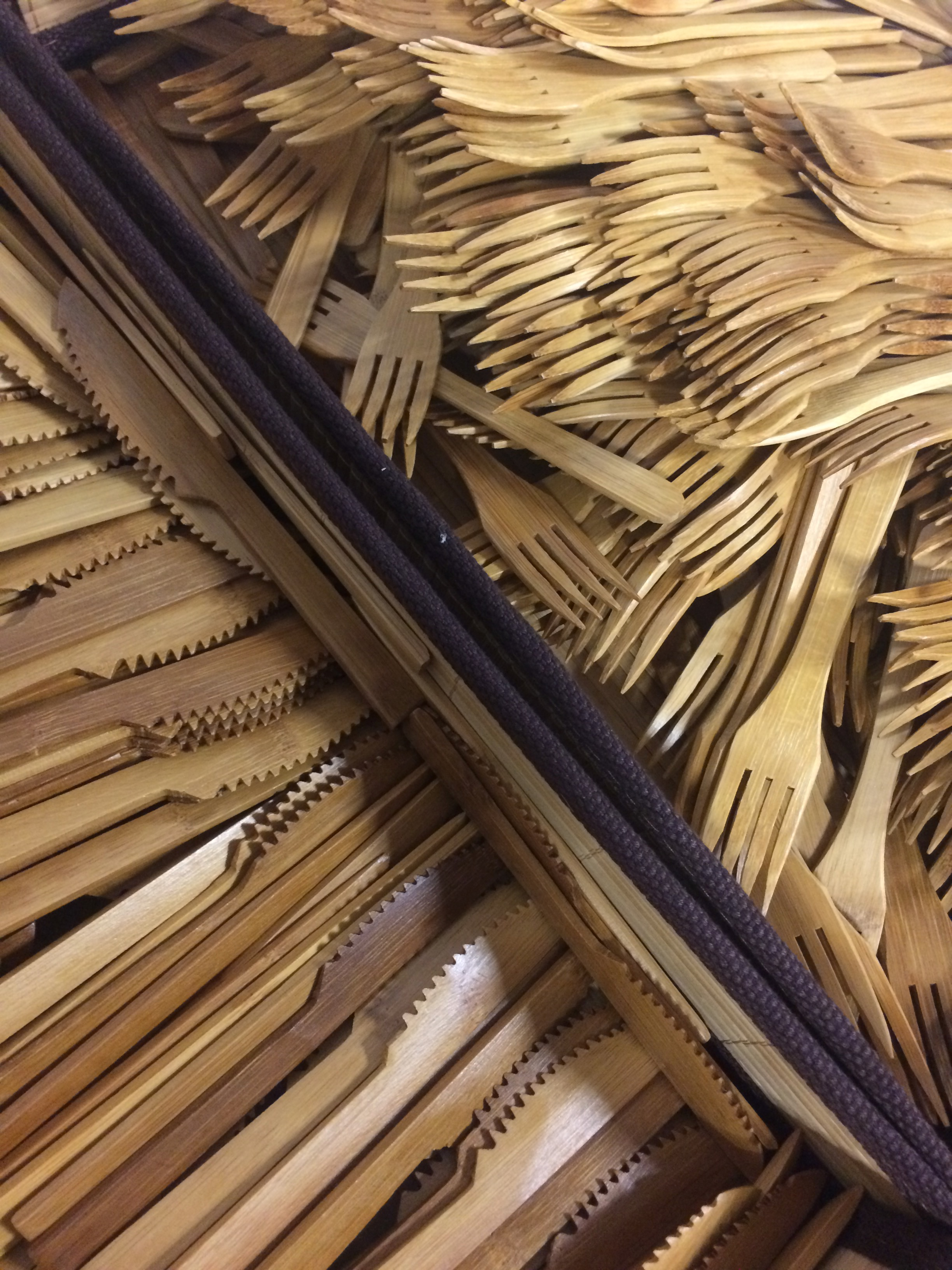
Bamboo cutlery

==== Plastic ====
Plastic cutlery is made for disposable use, and is frequently used outdoors for camping, excursions, and barbecues for instance. Introduced for convenience purposes — being lightweight and needing little clean-up after the meal — disposable cutlery made of plastic has become a huge worldwide market. These products have become essential for the catering industry, fast food and take-away outlets as well as being provided with airline meals where metal cutlery is banned, along with other disposable tableware — paper plates, plastic table covers, disposable cups, paper napkins, etc. The products are emblematic of throw-away societies and the cause of millions of tons of non-biodegradable plastic waste.

Plastic cutlery has been banned in Australia, but there remain public calls for its return. The European Union has banned such plastic products from 3 July 2021 as part of the European Plastics Strategy. Bans are also planned in the UK and Canada.

Also, plastic is used for some young children's cutlery that is often thicker and more durable than disposable plastic cutlery, often encountered in the early years of primary schools.

==== Wooden ====
As an eco-friendly biodegradable alternative to non-degradable plastic, wooden disposable cutlery is gaining popularity. Bamboo (although not a wood) and maple are popular choices. Some manufacturers coat their products in food-safe plant oils, waxes, and lemon juice for a longer shelf life making these safe for human use. Cutlery is then cured for a few days before leaving the manufacturing plant.

==== Edible ====
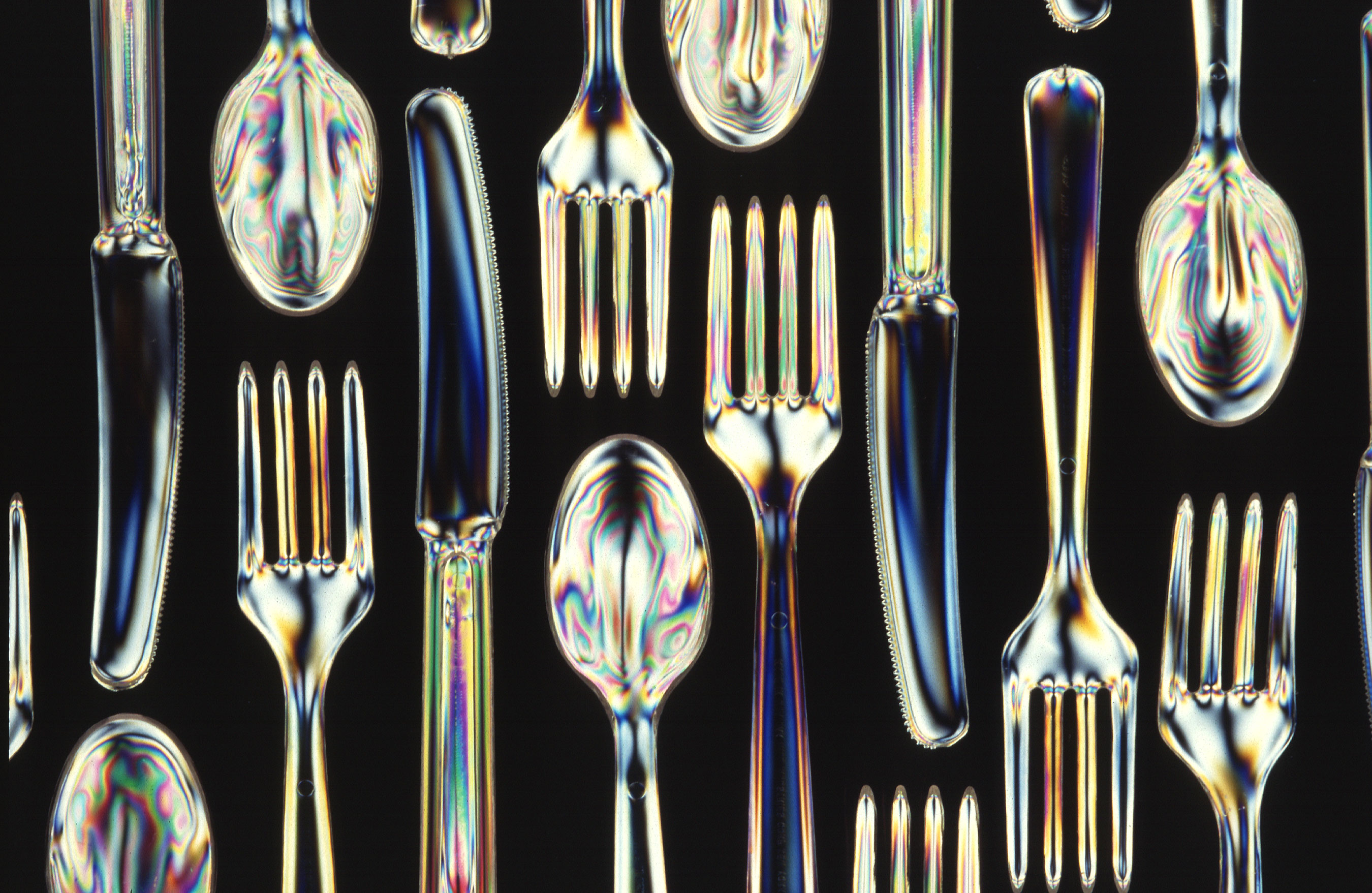
Starch-polyester disposable cutlery

Edible cutlery is made from dried grains. These are made primarily with rice, millet, or wheat. Since rice cultivation needs a lot of water, manufacturers market millet based products as more environment friendly. The batter is baked in moulds which hardens it. Some manufacturers offer an option of flavoured cutlery. Edible cutlery decomposes in about a week if disposed.

== Manufacturing centres ==
Traditional centres of cutlery-making include:

- Styria in Austria
- Carlos Barbosa in Brazil
- Thiers and Laguiole in France
- Solingen in Germany
- Galway in Ireland
- Premana in Italy
- Seki and Sakai in Japan
- Wazirabad in Pakistan
- Caldas das Taipas in Portugal
- Albacete and Toledo in Spain
- Sheffield in the United Kingdom
- Meriden and Oneida in United States of America

== See also ==
- Cutler (disambiguation)
- Eating utensil etiquette
- Steak knife
- Sujeo
- Table setting
- Tableware
- List of eating utensils
- List of food preparation utensils
