= Mess kit =

Metal set for food transportation and consumption

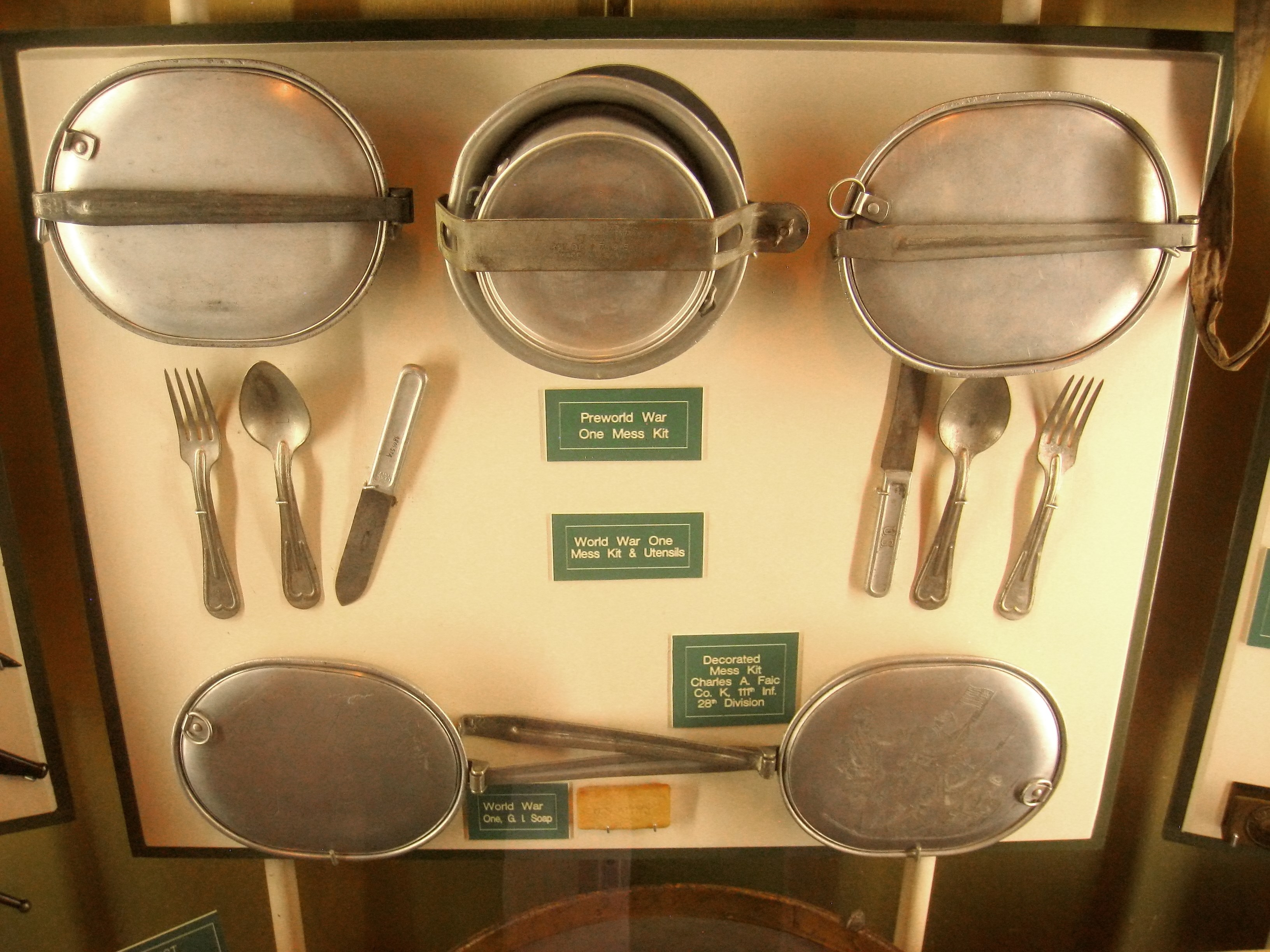
United States Army mess kits from World War I and the interwar period, displayed at the Soldiers and Sailors Memorial Hall and Museum in Pittsburgh, Pennsylvania, U.S.

A mess kit is a collection of silverware and cookware designed for use by military personnel for food and military rations. They may also be used during camping and backpacking. There are many varieties of mess kits that militaries issue to their personnel that later become available to consumers.

== Mess tin ==
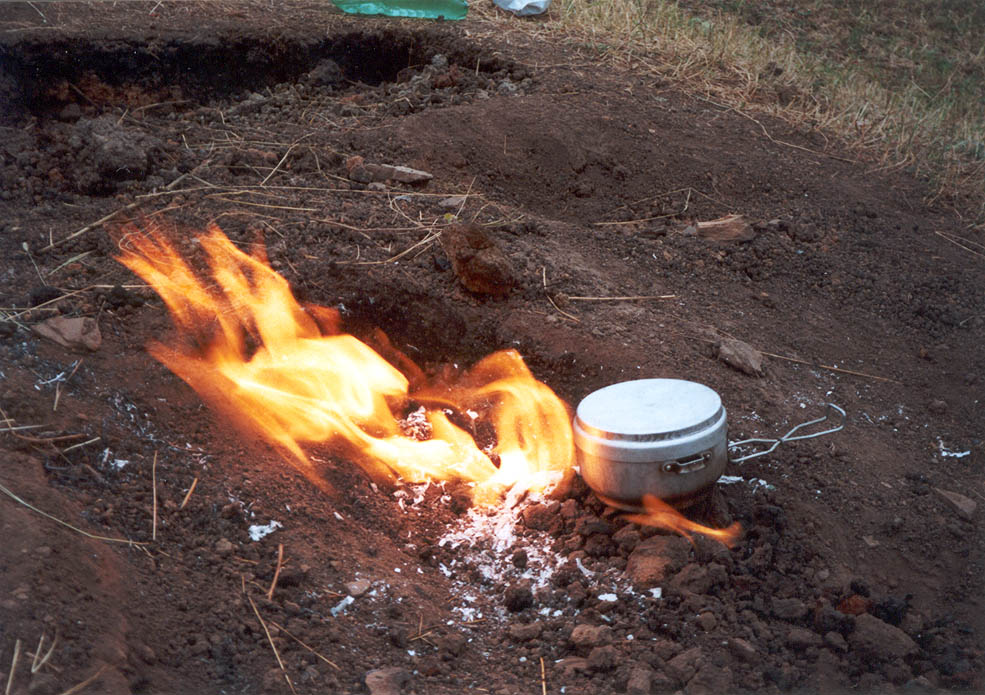
A circular Czechoslovak mess tin over freely burning natural gas in Buzău County, Romania

A mess tin is an item in a mess kit, designed to be used over portable cooking apparatus. A mess tin can be thought of as a portable version of a saucepan, intended primarily for boiling but also useful for frying. Mess tins were originally a military design, but are also popular among civilian campers.

Mess tins are generally rectangular with rounded off edges – the rounded edges are easier to clean inside than a sharp corner. Most mess tins are supplied as a set, with one slightly larger than the other, allowing them to nestle together for easy packing. This arrangement is also useful when using the tins for boiling, as the smaller tin can be used to hold the liquid, with the larger tin placed on top to act as a lid. In order to save weight, some designs stick with a single mess tin with a lid, with the lid often having a secondary role as a frying pan.

== Military ==
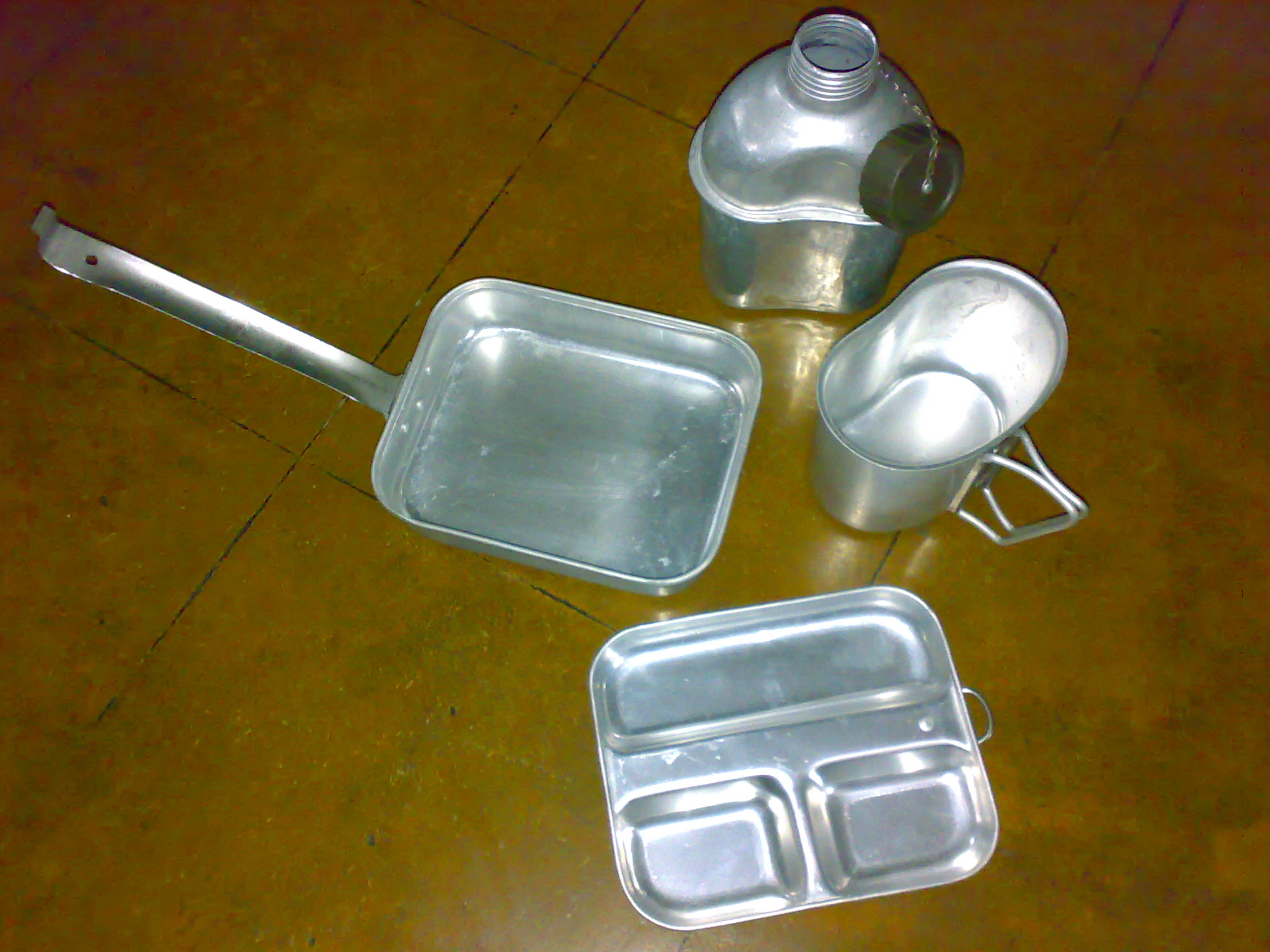
A closed mess kit used by the Armed Forces of the Philippines, consisting of a skillet, food tray, canteen and cup

While functionally similar to a one-man civilian mess kit, military mess kits are designed to be even more compact, using their space as efficiently as possible. Thus lids will almost always be used for preparing, cooking, and/or eating, and usually come in two or three pieces. As such, it may sacrifice certain features, or use other features to complement it.

When in a large camp, it is common for soldiers to use either normal dining ware, or a multi-compartment mess tray similar to a TV dinner tray, but much larger.

=== United States ===
Prior to World War II, two factors influenced the design of the US Army's M-1926, M-1932, and M-1942 mess kits. First, unlike most other armies of the day, the US mess kit was designed to serve men queuing in feeding lines and served in unit formations from large garrison-type field kitchens when not on daily combat operations. Secondly, US soldiers in the field were never expected to forage or to completely cook their rations, even in daily combat or front line service. Instead, when not used as a serving tray for company-size or larger units, the mess kit was used to re-heat pre-measured servings of the canned Reserve Ration. After 1938, it was used for the new C-ration, a canned combat ration with several menu precooked or dried food items. Today, though canned and dried combat rations have further evolved into the MRE, these can now be self-heated, and thus only a containment tray is required for most units.

The US Army's flat ovoid M-1932 wartime-issue mess kit was made of galvanized steel (stainless steel in the later M-1942), and was a divided pan-and-body system. When opened, the mess kit consisted of two halves: the deeper half forms a shallow, flat-bottom, ovoid "Meat can, body", designed to receive the "meat ration", the meat portion of the pre-war canned Reserve Ration. The "Meat can, body", with its folding handle extended, can double as a crude skillet. The "Mess kit, plate" (lid) is even shallower, and is pressed to form two compartments, with a center divide wide enough to accommodate the folding handle. The plate also has a very secure ring that is held in place by friction.

When stored, the "Mess kit, plate" is placed on top of the ovoid "Meat can, body", while the stamped folding handle is folded over the inverse side of the plate's center divider, and latched onto the edge of the body. It is further secured folding the lid's ring toward the center of the mess kit, which locks onto another latch. In use, each piece may be used individually, or as a unitary three-compartment mess tray, accomplished by sliding the lid-plate's center divider onto the folding handle, and securing it to the handle by the ring-and-latch mechanisms. When latched, the kit can be held in a ready position by the user in one hand to receive US Army's 'A' or 'B' field kitchen rations. As the soldier passed along the mess line, food service personnel would dole out hot items first, often meat followed by vegetables, potatoes, and other side dishes, ostensibly separated by the tray dividers. While a soldier could use the handled "Meat can, body" from his kit to cook raw food, it is really too shallow and thin to serve as an effective skillet, and was usually restricted to heating the canned meat ration. After 1938, the "Meat can, body" was used to heat the meat and vegetable component of the C-ration, or to reconstitute breakfast items such as C-ration powdered eggs.

To complement the mess kit, soldiers used a stamped cup especially molded to fit over the bottom of the US Army's standard one-quart (950 ml) canteen. This cup could be used to boil water for coffee, or for heating or reconstituting soup or other foods. During World War II, units preparing heated combat rations in the "Meat can, body" or canteen cup mainly used locally procured combustible materials or Sterno fuel units of jellied alcohol. The latter could be stored within an issued folding stove for deployment when heating food, soup, or coffee in the field.

After World War II, a specially designed Esbit stove was issued to fit over the cup-and-canteen unit, similar to designs used in other armies.

=== German and Japanese ===
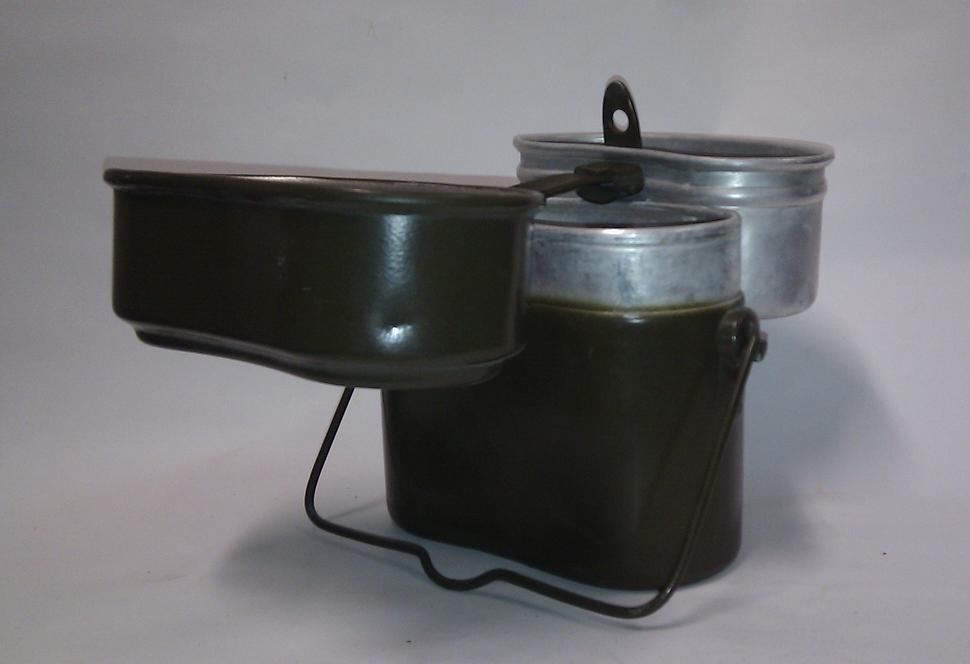
Bundeswehr mess kit

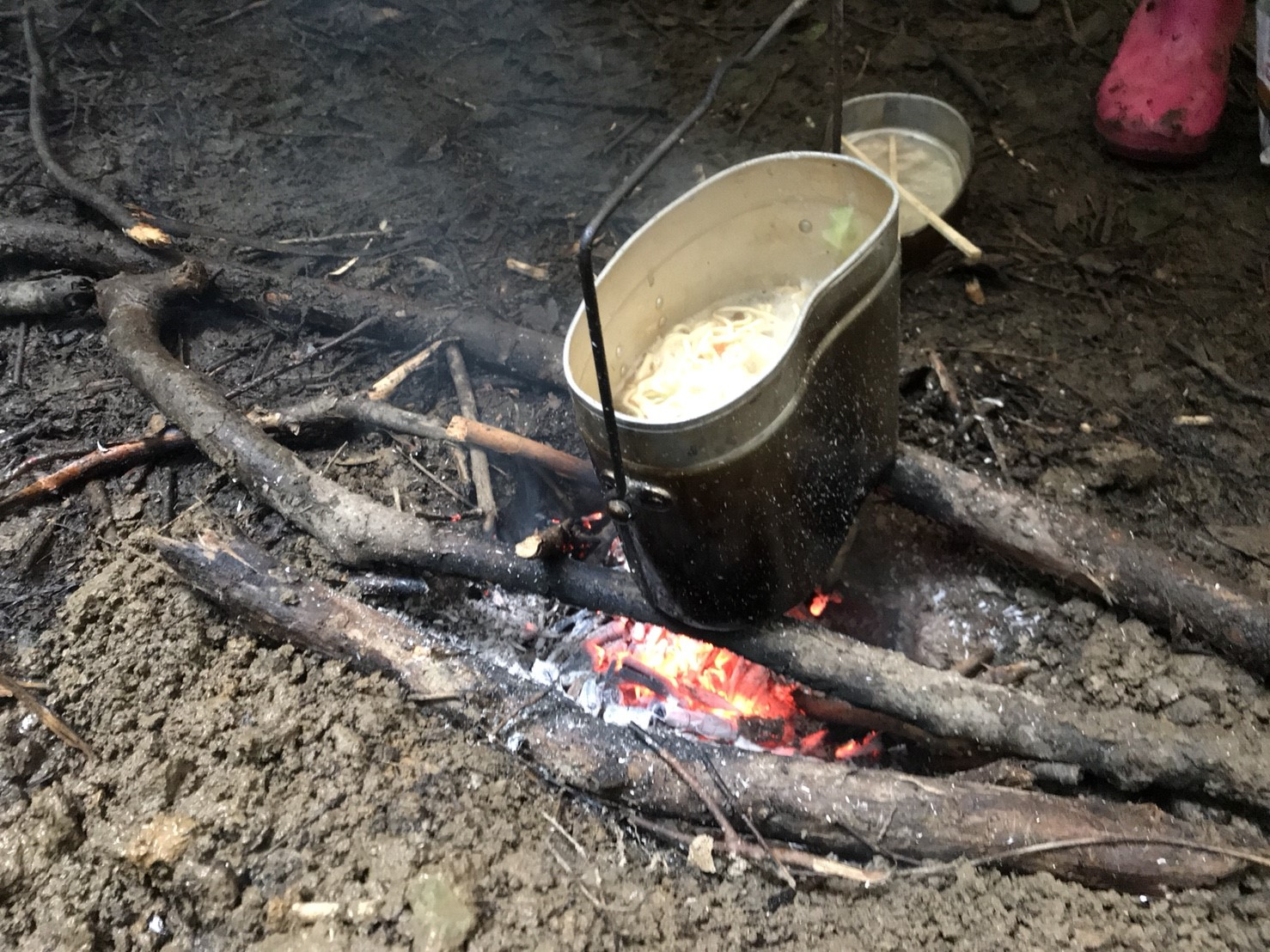
Modern Japanese camper's mess kit similar to an Imperial Army model

During World War II, the German and Japanese Imperial Army used mess kits that were similar in several ways. In storage, their dimensions were similar to US mess kits, but were split widthwise instead of lengthwise, around two-thirds of the body, creating a pot with handle and a cup.

The German mess kit (Essgeschirr) was designed in 1908, a modification of a Swiss design from 1882. Originally, the base held two litres, marked into 1/4 sections, and the lid holding another 1/4. This model replaced the 1850 Kochgeschirr. The new 1908 Essgeschirr was made of aluminium and not designed for cooking; only to contain food distributed from field kitchens. The early models of the 1908 were painted in a distinct matte black. In 1910, the aluminum handle was replaced with one of galvanised iron, as aluminum often got hot in the soldiers' hands. The 1908 model was in production until 1940. In 1931, a model later called Kochgeschirr 31 (Cooking pot model 31) was developed. It was capable of cooking, and held 1.7 liters. With only very minor changes, this model remained in service with the German military (both East and West) as well as with the German disaster relief services (THW), which were painted grey.

They were mainly used in conjunction with a folding Esbit stove, which, when folded, could store Esbit pellets and occupy a very small area. The German mess kit was usually held together with a leather strap, which was used to fasten the mess kit to the soldier's bread bag in combat order or assault pack of the webbing equipment in marching order.

The Japanese Army enlisted men's mess kit, or hangō (rice container), differed from other armies' mess kits in several respects. No attempt was made to conform the hangō to the Japanese one-liter M-94 oval water bottle, which was larger than that issued to the armies of some other nations. The hangō consisted of a brown kidney-shaped, oval-bottomed, heavy-gauge aluminum rice cooker pot with lid, and an insert tray stored inside the pot. The lid and tray were also used as serving plates. A simplified model, the Ro, was introduced later in the war, which lacked the pot insert.

The men cooked with hangōs over open fires or cans of jellied alcohol. In addition to its usefulness as a cooking vessel, the hangō was useful for carrying the cooked rice. During the Second World War, it was occasionally adopted by members of the United States Army and Chinese Army which had captured Japanese equipment, and later by the Viet Minh.

=== Finnish ===
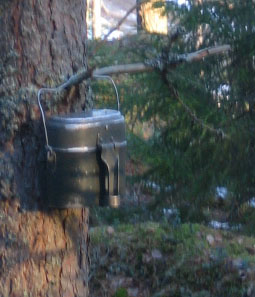
Finnish Defence Forces mess kit

The Finnish Defence Forces mess kit (kenttäkeittoastia or kenttäpakki) is almost identical to the German M31 mess kit design, but, unlike the latter, a lusikkahaarukka (a type of folding spoon-fork utensil) is included with a Finnish mess kit instead of a separate fork and spoon set. A lusikkahaarukka therefore cannot be stored inside a Finnish mess tin as it would cause excessive noise in the mess tin.

=== Soviet/Russian ===
During the Second World War the Soviet Army mess kit was a two-piece design similar to that used by the Wehrmacht forces that consisted of a large main canteen part, and a smaller saucepan component that also doubled as the mess tin lid. The kit also had a wire handle which many soldiers used to hang the mess kit from their web equipment or backpack. This design was supplemented in the mid-1980s with a second design that featured a metal water bottle held in the middle. The next layer of the set was a large canteen/cooking pot with a wire handle, then a smaller saucepan-type component with a folding metal handle. This last component fitted over the base of the larger cooking pot, the handle was then folded up and clipped over the cooking pot and the lip of the water bottle. This variant was often called "VDV type". The mess set was sometimes issued with a pouch, although this was by no means certain and many soldiers simply hung it onto their equipment from the wire handle. Officers were often issued a satchel-type bag for their mess kits in keeping with their smart image. This latest design of mess kit continues to be used today in the armies of many former Soviet republics, but in recent years the military of the Russian Federation has stopped issuing mess kits to soldiers due to the lack of adequate supply owing to the size of newly formed combat units, lack of adequate domestic production, poor storage of existing units and the sale of Soviet-era stockpiles to civilians and third-party buyers.

=== Swedish ===
The Swedish Armed Forces Kokkärl m/1940 mess kit is a complete package, similar in design to a German mess kit, but larger and oval-shaped. It breaks down into two parts, the first part being a steel stand/windshield/wood-burning stove (with a Svea alcohol burner unit), whilst the other part consists of two pots (usually aluminium). The larger pot has a wire handle, or bail, for suspending over a fire; the smaller has hinged handle. The two pots nest together and stow inside the windshield. The set is completed by a small plastic fuel bottle. It is recommended that the fuel bottle and burner unit be stored separately, outside the pots (since alcohol may otherwise seep out). A Swedish army plastic mug can also be fitted inside the pots.

The stove uses small sticks, wood chips, or pine cones as fuel. When using the alcohol burner, the Svea burner unit may advantageously be replaced with a Trangia replacement burner, which appears to be more efficient.

=== Swiss ===
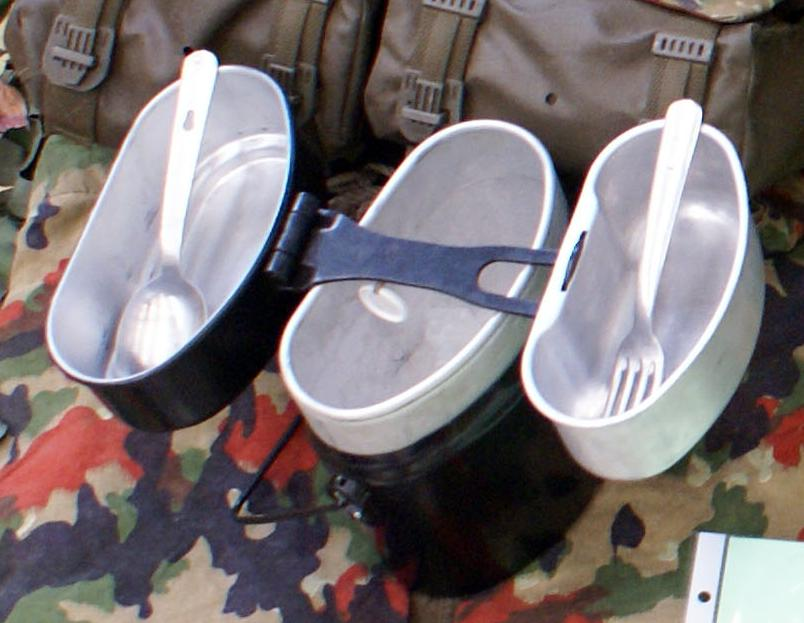
Swiss Army gamelle

The Swiss mess kit (French gamelle) was originally introduced in 1875. This Runde Gamelle 1875 was a pot made of tin-plated sheet steel with a lid and handle. It was however later deemed unsuitable and so in 1882 a revised design Einzelkochgeschirr Ord. 1882 was introduced. This model is a canteen-cup system: a tall, one liter canteen, and a lid; the lid serves as a cup which can be fit inside the canteen, better heating its contents. The 1882 design later formed the basis of the modern German mess kit design as mentioned above. All models since 1882 were officially designated Einzelkochgeschirr, but soldiers kept calling them gamelle.

=== British ===
==== 1908 Pattern Mess Tin ====
In the First World War, the British Army used a metal, two-piece, kidney shaped mess tin.

The 1874-model was made of tinplated steel and had a "D" plan view with rounded corners. The tray or cup piece had a folding handle that opened to the side. The tray also functioned as a deep lid for the pan. This change from the 1854-model allowed the use of the narrow and tighter curved side of the cup rim for drinking. It also permitted the tray to briefly be held over a fire. The corners of the square shaped bail were also more rounded.

The geometry of the older British mess tins was substantially different. The 1854-model was D-shaped in plan view and was made of tinplated iron. It was fabricated from front and back panels of sheet metal. The tray or cup nested inside the pan. The handle of the tray or cup folded inside but was on the flat "back side" forcing the user to drink from the broadly curved front. The lid was intermediate in depth, could be used as a plate, and set down securely on the pan. The bail was square shaped and the corners were tight curves.

The 1810 (1813 – 14)-model is semicircular or C-shaped in plan view and is made of tinplated iron. The tray of the 1810-model had no handle but nested inside the pan or lower section. The lid covered the pan and had a pull ring for easy removal, but apparently had no other intended use. The bail was curved.

==== 1937 Pattern Mess Tin ====
A new pattern of mess tin was developed for the Web Equipment 1937 Pattern, which was a nested, two-piece rectangular mess tin with long, folding handles. An enamelled tin mug was used for drinking hot liquids. The water bottle of the 1908 Pattern Web Equipment was unchanged, though the web carrier was changed to incorporate the 1-inch-wide brace ends of the 1937 gear.

==== Contemporary ====
The British Armed Forces generally use mess tins for cooking in the field, although with the British Armed Forces primarily using Boil in the Bag rations, many soldiers prefer a single large metal mug, as one item can be used to cook food and to make and consume hot drinks, thereby cutting down on equipment weight. As such cups fit beneath the standard water bottle, they also take up less space in the soldiers' equipment. The mess tin or cup is usually used with the standard issue FireDragon folding burner & fuel.

=== Canadian ===
==== Historical ====
Canadian mess equipment was similar to that used by the British in the first half of the 20th century, i.e., that issued with 1908 and 1937 Pattern Web Equipment. Canada issued its own 1951 Pattern Web Equipment, 1964 Pattern Web Equipment, and 1982 Pattern Web Equipment.

==== Contemporary ====
The use of aluminium in mess equipment has been identified as a health hazard, and plastics and disposables have become more common. In particular, the use of Individual Meal Packs (IMP) have become common, with chemical cooking bags. Messing from hayboxes/fresh rations in the field is often accomplished with disposable mess gear (i.e. paper plates).

== Camping ==
A civilian mess kit, which may serve from one person to a family of eight, is a collection of common kitchen wares designed to be lightweight and easy to store. Such kits are typically constructed from aluminium, though enameled steel is also common, and some items (such as cutlery or plates) may be made of more expensive materials, such as titanium, to further save weight, or of plastic. A civilian mess kit usually contains at least a skillet, a kettle (which may also serve as a coffee pot), a plate, a cup (typically a Sierra cup), and cutlery. Utensils usually consist of forks, knives, and spoons, as at home, but may be replaced by specialty items like sporks or folding chopsticks. Kits usually come with either folding handles or a detachable handle which can be used with other cookware. Items are stored compactly by nesting them in other components; the whole kit may be placed in a stuff sack.

== See also ==
- Billycan – cooking pot in the form of a metal bucket
- Bento box – Japanese lunch box
- Cezve – long-handled pot to make Turkish coffee
- Dosirak – Korean packed meal
- Tiffin carrier – kind of lunch box from India
