= Lusikkahaarukka =

Spoon-fork combination

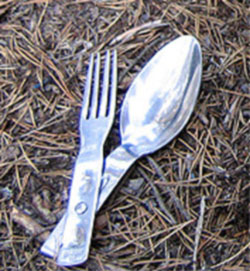
A spoon-fork combination used by the Finnish military

Lusikkahaarukka (Finnish pronunciation: [ˈlusikːɑˌhɑːrukːɑ]; "spoon-fork") or LuHa is a stainless steel, folding spoon-fork combination issued together with a mess kit in the Finnish Army. It is widely used in camping and outdoors activities.

The spoon portion is a slightly oversized soup spoon which makes it useful for stirring when the mess kit is used to cook rations in the field. The fork portion is rarely used as most foods are more easily eaten with the spoon. When folded, the lusikkahaarukka can be inserted (using an appropriate slot) in the Finnish army mess kit, although this is discouraged because, more often than not, it slips off from the fittings and starts to rattle around. Finnish army conscripts are allowed to carry their civilian puukkos while in uniform, and everyone is assumed to own one, so a separate knife is not needed.

Originally invented in conjunction with the pakki (mess kit) in Imperial Germany in late 19th or early 20th century it returned to Finland with the Jägers in 1918. The current model of the lusikkahaarukka is manufactured by Hackman and is one of the oldest items still in use by the Finnish Army. The lusikkahaarukka are hard wearing, so much so that new conscripts are still issued with units manufactured during World War II.

== Also known as ==
- Lusikkahaarukka-mysteeri – Translates as "spoon-fork mystery".
- Mysteerio – Military slang.
- Luha (an abbreviation)
- Kniffelknaffel – Swedish term used by Swedophone conscripts

== See also ==
- Spork – Item of cutlery combining a spoon and fork
- Splayd
- Other combined utensils
