= Combination eating utensils =

Utensils with hybrid traits, such as sporks and knorks

Combination eating utensils, also known as hybrid utensils, are utensils that implement the qualities of other utensils to combine them into one. This can be done to make a more convenient, less wasteful, or more cost-efficient product. Many different types of combination utensils have been created, each designed to serve a different purpose by combining aspects of different common utensils like the spoon or fork.

The best known and most commonly used combination utensil is the spork, a combination spoon and fork.

== Spork ==
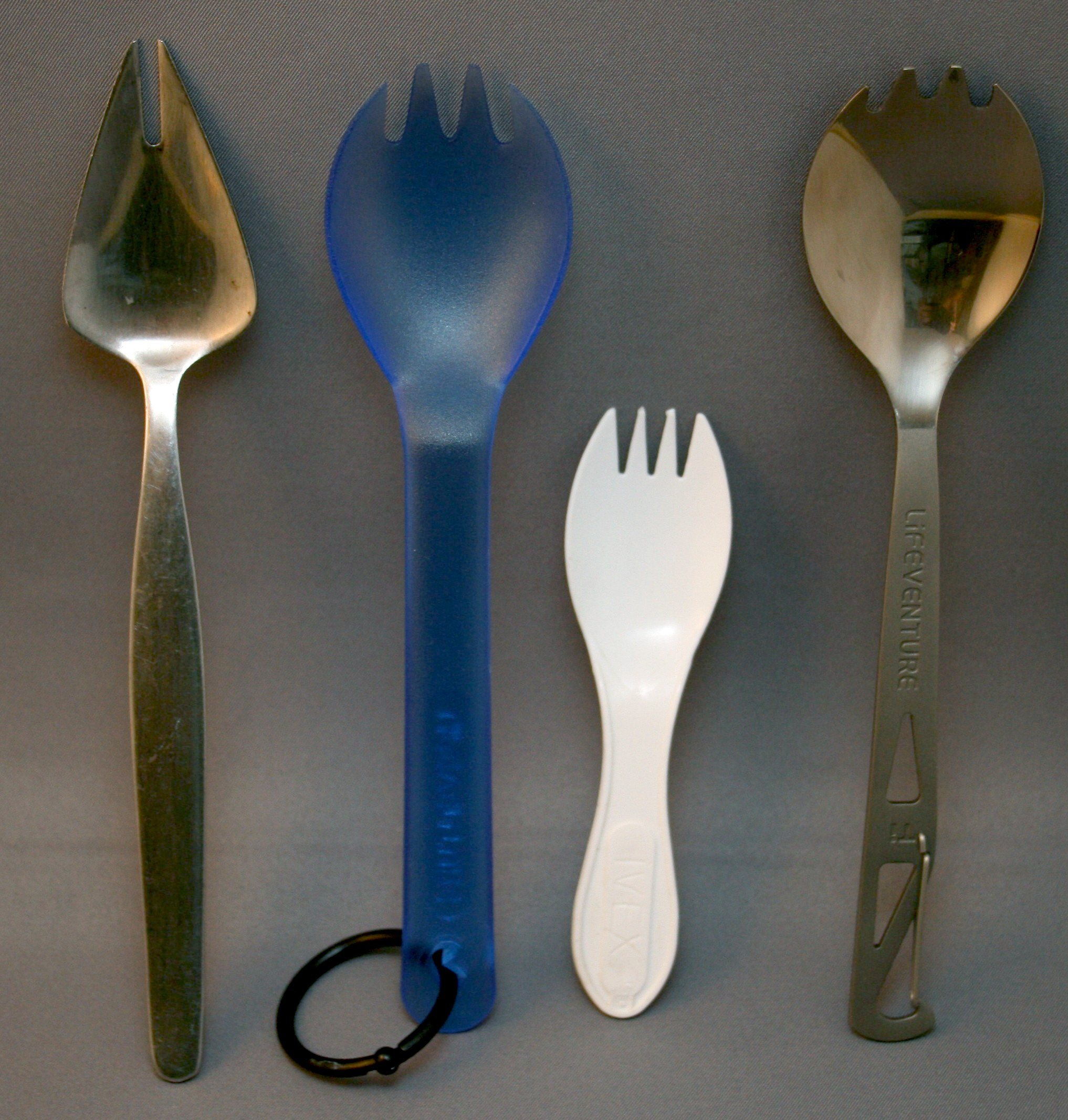
Sporks

Sporks are a type of combination utensil that combine the functions of a spoon and fork. Sporks have been around for some centuries, with some utensils resembling sporks being found as far back as 1894. The word "spork" was first referenced in the Century Dictionary in 1909, calling it a portmanteau of spoon and fork. It was described as a long, slender spoon that possesses fork-like tines. The spork is easily one of the most identifiable and popularly used hybrid utensil in modern times, being used in prisons, schools, restaurants, and various other institutions. According to The Washington Post, approximately 35% of American adults own a spork. The name "Spork" was first trademarked in 1970 by the Van Brode Milling Company.

Other variations of the spork include the ice cream fork, which appears very similar in resemblance to the spork and was actually invented before the spork during the Victorian era. Even earlier versions and artifacts of combining a spoon and fork can be found from the Dutch, with some estimated to be from the 17th to 19th century. In Finnish, there is a word for spork, lusikkahaarukka, literally meaning spoon-fork. It performs the same job as the spork by combining the functions of a spoon and fork together. However, instead of combining them into a single-part utensil, it is composed of two parts, a spoon and a fork, linked together by a joint. It is typically used by the Finnish military.

=== Ramen spork ===
A ramen spork is a form of spork designed by Masami Takahashi to eliminate waste produced by disposable chopsticks. The design consists of a spoon with four prongs that extend directly from the front rim of the spoon, rather than a cup with incisions made to create tines as usually seen on the traditional spork design. It was originally designed for the popular Japanese ramen chain, Sugakiya, in 2007. It was made to easily eat ramen by being able to twirl the noodles with the prongs and then ladle the soup with the spoon part, as described by the Museum of Modern Art, which sells the utensil. It is also sold by the Japanese American National Museum store.

=== Spork Chops ===
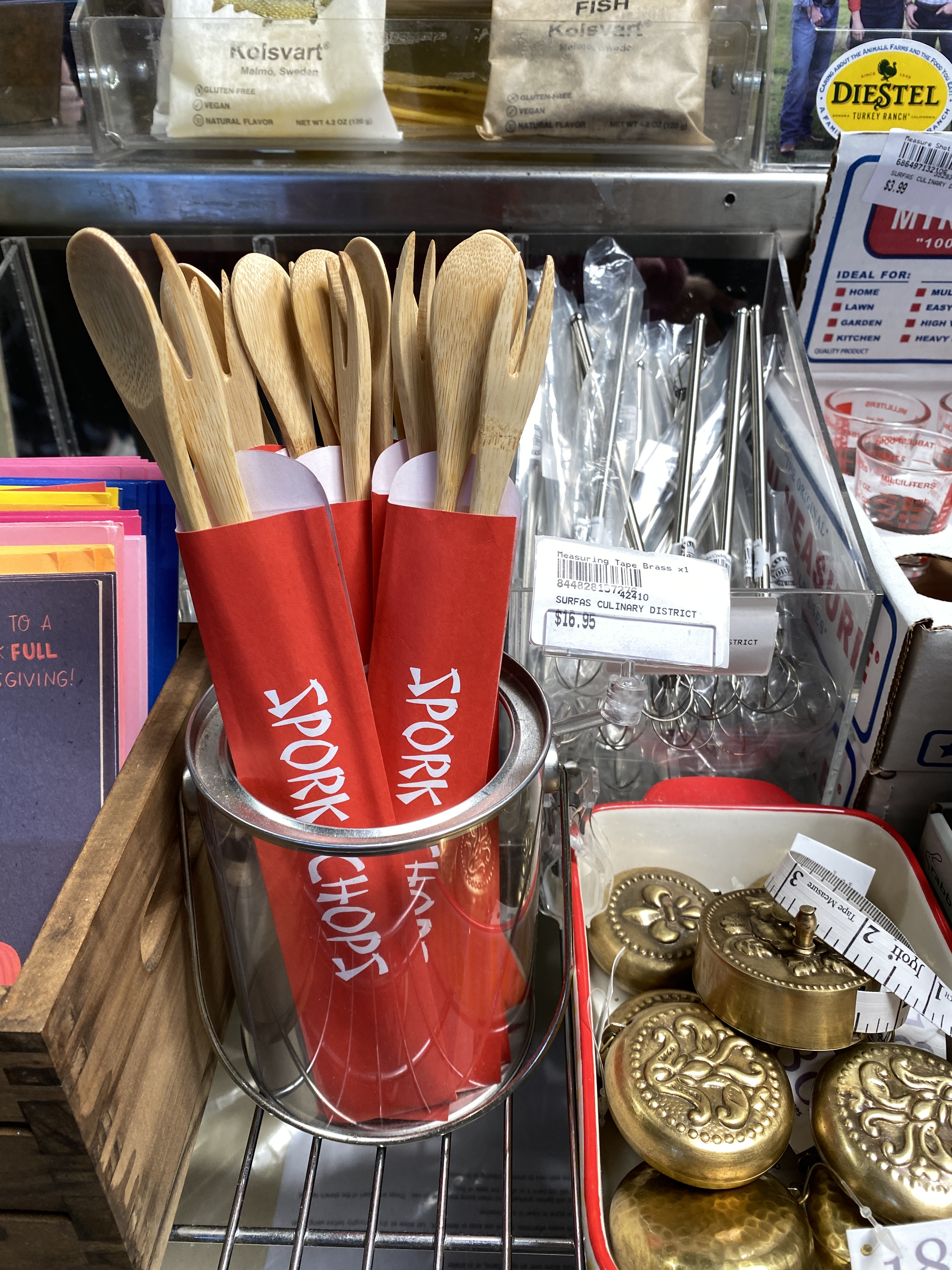
Display of spork chops in a culinary-supply shop in California

Spork Chops are a type of combination utensil similar to the chork that combine chopsticks with a fork and spoon. It is composed of two sticks, with one stick ending in a two-prong fork and the other stick ending in a small spoon. Similar to the chork, it is made to accommodate those who have difficulties using chopsticks while preserving the chopsticks function for those who do know how to use them. They can also be used to eat certain foods, such as noodle soup, which may require a spoon, fork, and chopsticks. They are available for sale in various websites, notably at the Carnegie Museums of Pittsburgh store.

== Splayd ==
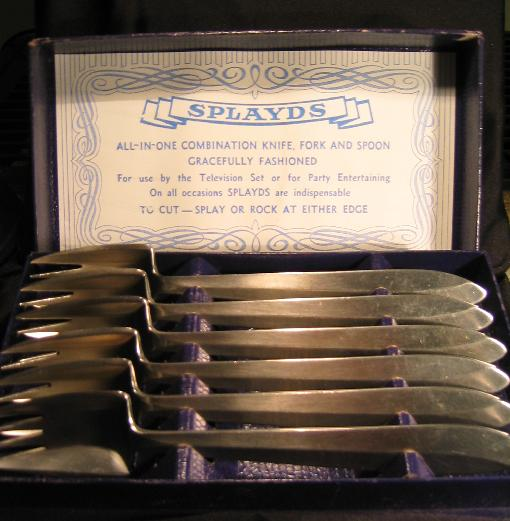
Splayds, a combination knife, fork, and spoon

Splayds are a type of combination utensil that combine the functions of the three main eating utensils used in Western culture: forks, spoons, and knives. It was invented in the 1940s in Australia by William McArthur, attributing his idea to a moment where he saw women having difficulty balancing all their utensils and their plate at the same time. Hence, it was invented for convenience so that people wouldn't need three separate utensils to eat. By the 1990s, it is claimed that it had been sold in 52 countries, with over 5 million pieces worldwide.

=== Tritensil ===
A different design of combining the fork, spoon, and knife was created by Map Project Office, in collaboration with Fortnum and Mason, called the Tritensil. The studio claimed that they created it in an attempt to improve the original sporf and spork, as well as to create a more elegant, useful, cost-efficient, and environmentally friendly utensil. It was designed after several trials to be used on many different foods and for food-related tasks, like eating salad or spreading jam. It was originally designed by Fortnum in 1914 for their Christmas catalogue and was later revived.

=== Spifork ===
Another design for combining the fork, spoon, and knife is the spifork. It was made by DMECH, Inc., based in Cincinnati, Ohio. It claims to reduce plastic waste by making an eco-friendlier utensil. The utensil consists of a spork on one end of the utensil and a knife on the other, designed to be snapped in half to create two separate utensils, as featured in Cincinnati magazine. The creators hope to replace the three-piece utensil set typically given out by shops and eateries.

== The FRED ==
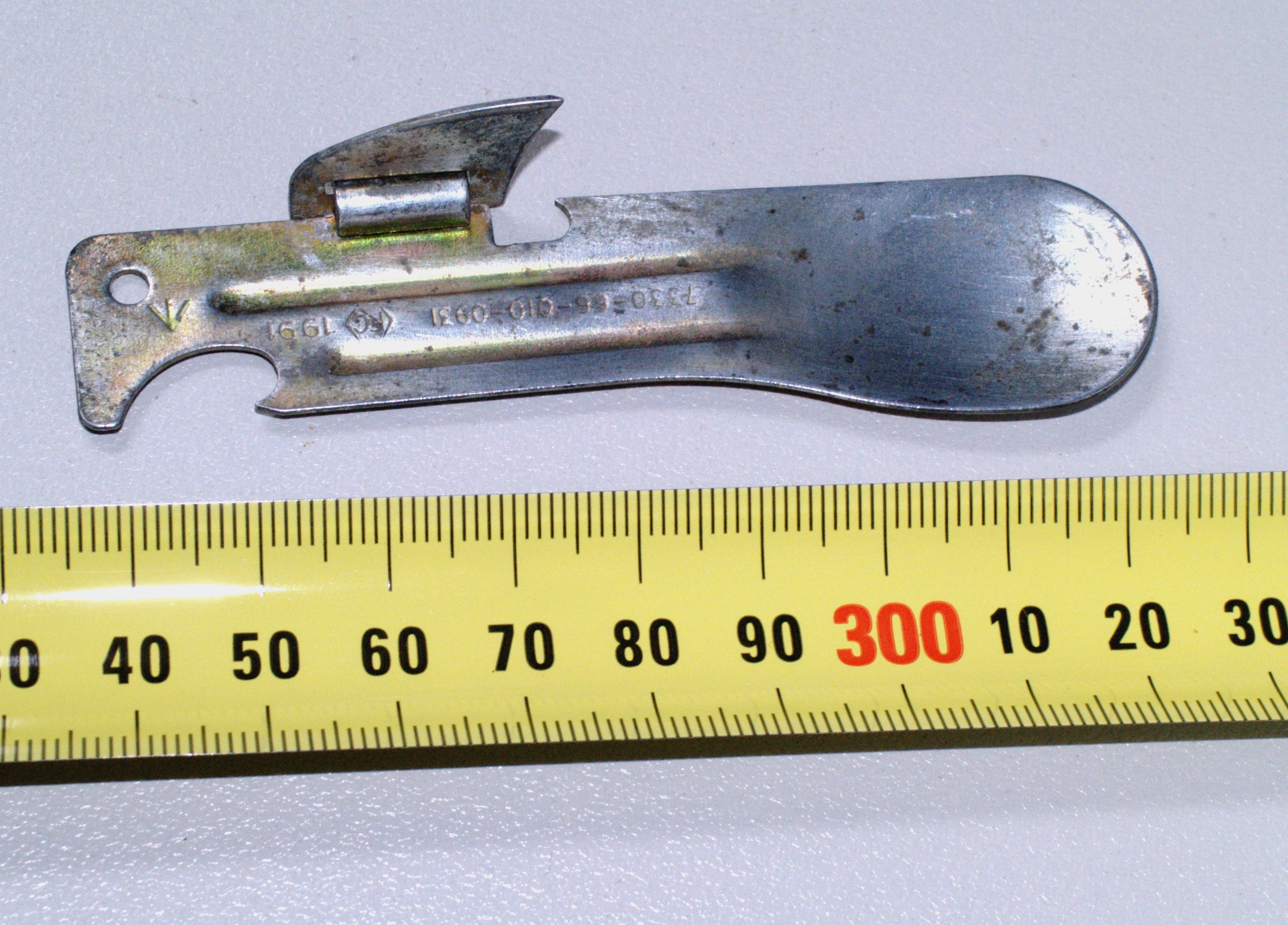
Field Ration Eating Device

The FRED, an acronym for "field ration eating device", or humorously, "fucking ridiculous eating device", is a combination of a can opener, bottle opener, and spoon into one compact utensil. It is issued by the Australian Defence Force to its soldiers. It became part of the force's ration packs in the 1960s, and, as of 2016, is still actively distributed by the force. Artifacts of the FRED that were used during the Vietnam War can also be found at the Australian War Memorial.

== Spife ==
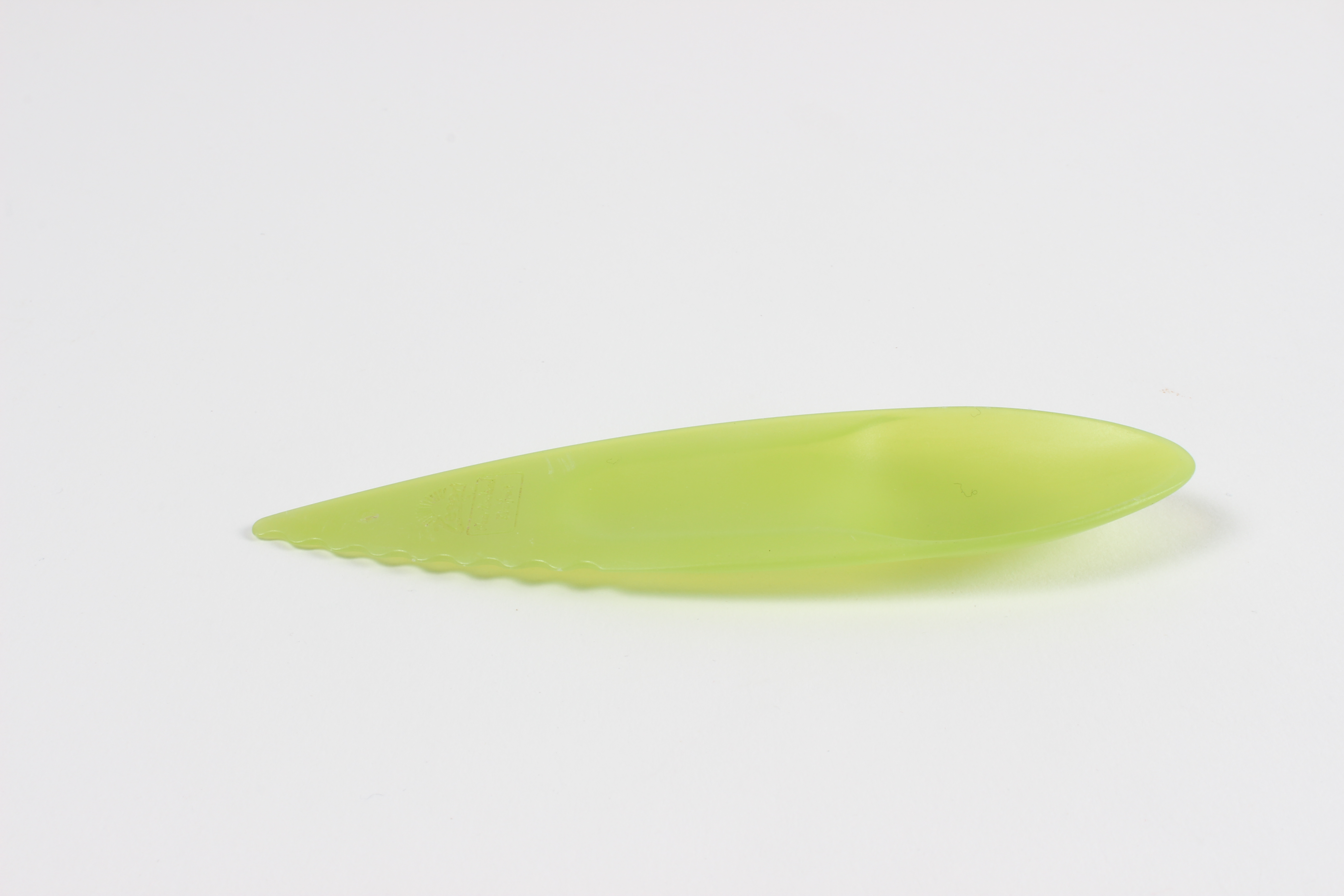
A Zespri spife, intended to cut and eat kiwifruit

Spifes are a type of hybrid utensil that combine the functions of a spoon and a knife. The name is a portmanteau of "spoon" and "knife". It was created by Zespri, a New Zealand kiwifruit marketer, to make a utensil that could be easily used to cut and eat kiwifruit. Another version of the spife was also created by Zespri, in collaboration with Scion, called the "biospife". It was designed with the goal of making a more environmentally friendly and sustainable product, utilizing bioplastic materials and designed to be able to be disposed of alongside kiwifruit skin. After significant development and research, in 2017, about 150,000 biospifes were ready to be distributed to the market.

The Canadian branch of Nutella, a popular brand for chocolate hazelnut spread, also developed their own spife and held a contest in 2017 to give away about 40,000 spifes to any winners. A promotional campaign was developed by Nutella to sponsor their spife and it was marketed on several social medias, such as Instagram and FaceBook, and in a series of videos on YouTube titled the Nutella Breakfast Challenge. These aimed to demonstrate the versatility of Nutella.

The concept of combining a spoon and a knife into one piece has existed for a considerable amount of time. The first examples include old Roman artifacts that date as far back as the 3rd century CE, although only the spoon part is preserved in some instances. It is presumed that, at some point, there was a blade part that would have been attached to the other end of the tool. Roman artifacts like these have been found in various parts of Europe, such as Worms, Cologne, and Helpston. The blade is typically the least preserved part of the artifact and would have been attached to the handle by means of an iron tang. They were made of various materials, such as silver, bone, and bronze.

Other utensils that perform a similar function of combining a spoon and knife include the grapefruit spoon, which appears as a spoon with the tip of the spoon possessing a serrated edge. It is used to eat citrus fruits by using the serrated edge to cut through the rind and then using the spoon part to scoop out and isolate the pulp to easily eat it.

== Chork ==
Chorks are a type of combination utensil that combine the functions of chopsticks and forks. They were popularized by the major fast-food restaurant chain Panda Express to assist people who have difficulties using chopsticks, a utensil that is considered challenging to use. The utensil first appeared in a photo in 2016 previewing the restaurant's limited edition General Tso's chicken.

The origins of the chork are claimed to be from B.I.G, also known as Brown Innovation Group, which debuted the concept in 2010 at the National Restaurant Association trade show, winning an innovation award. Invented by Jordan Brown, he was inspired by his difficulties using chopsticks when he was at a sushi restaurant, needing to reach for a fork instead when attempting to grasp smaller grains of rice. He designed it for people who still have not mastered how to use chopsticks and still need to occasionally use a fork. On the company's website, it claims to be cost-effective and useful in assisting people into becoming a master at chopsticks, with three different uses: as a fork, as a trainer, and as chopsticks.

=== Forkchops ===
Forkchops are another hybrid utensil that combines the functions of chopsticks and forks while additionally including the function of a knife. It was designed by Donald BonAsia, a Los Angeles designer, and were available to be sold in the Japanese American National Museum store.

== Chopsticks-spoon combinations ==
There is no single name for utensils that combine the functions of a spoon and chopsticks into one utensil, but there have been two notable designs. Aissa Logerot, a French designer, created the "chopsticks plus one", a combination consisting of a separate cup that acts as a spoon, which has two small holes on the side where a handle would typically be attached on a regular spoon. These holes are where two chopsticks can be easily fitted to be able to convert the two chopsticks into a handle. The chopsticks combined with the spoon piece can then perform the function of a regular spoon, as demonstrated by photos of the product. It is also known as the "Spoonplus".

Another design is named the Froggetmee (alternatively spelled FrogGetMee or Frog Get MEE), designed by Ankul Assavaviboonpan. As described by Wired, it combines chopsticks with a spoon on the other end and could allow for fast consumption of food. Assavaviboonpan won the Good Design 2006 award for the Froggetmee, under the household products section.

== Knork ==
Knorks are a type of hybrid utensil that combine the functions of a knife and a fork. The name is a portmanteau of the words "knife" and "fork". They were designed by Mike Miller in Newton, Kansas. He first conceived the design in the eighth grade while trying to eat pizza with a fork. He had trouble trying to cut the pizza, so he thought of a half-knife, half-fork solution. He made his first prototype using his mother's flatware and Bondo to stick the flatware together. He dropped out of his university in order to pursue designing the knork, borrowing US$10,000 from his grandparents and ordering US$40,000 worth of materials in order to create the knork. He eventually debuted the knork at the 2003 Kansas State Fair. The knork was designed to be ambidextrous and included a finger platform to make it easier to cut and to remain comfortable while cutting. Since its release, the utensil has garnered success, attracting the attention of brands such as Bed Bath & Beyond, Taco Bell, KFC, as well as the U.S. Military, who were interested in developing a folding titanium knork. The knorks are in collection at the Kansas Historical Society's online catalog. The Knork brand also designs a variety of other utensils.

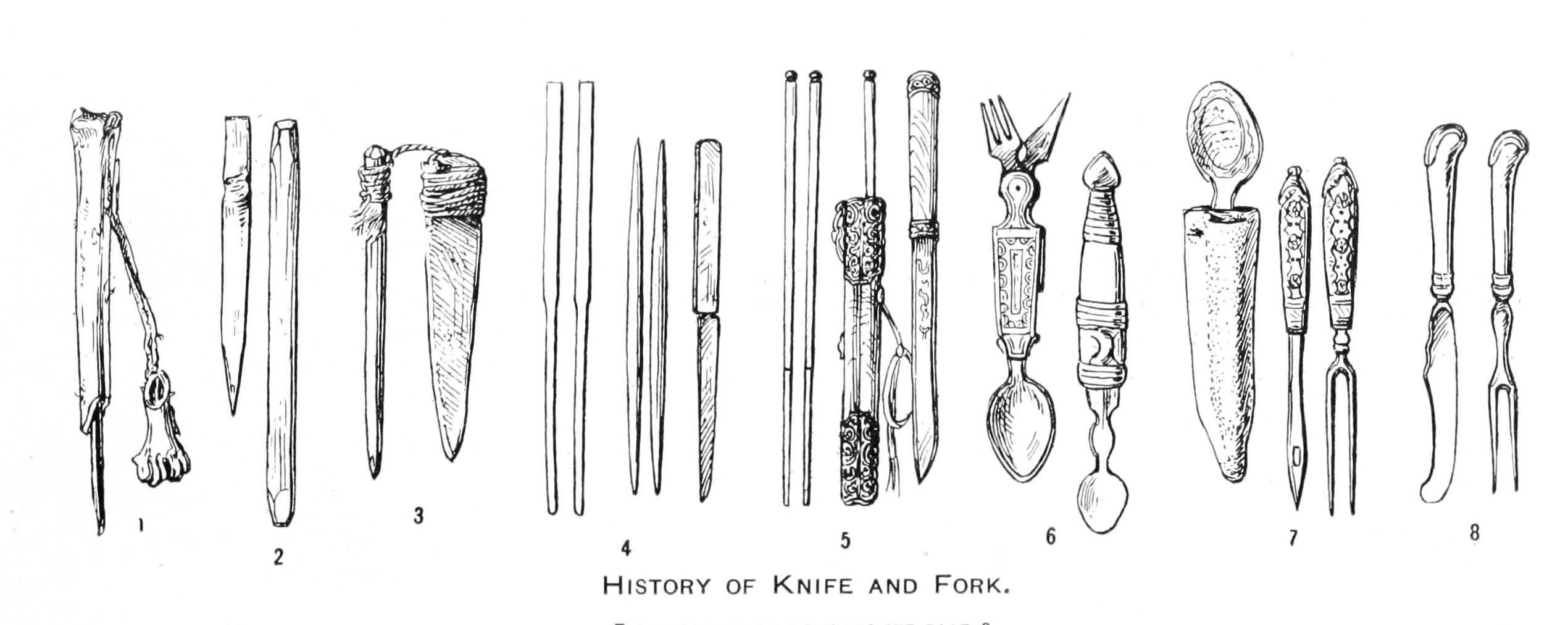
The utensil denoted as No. 3 is labeled as "Combination knife and fork. (Model.) Andaman Islands." in the Proceedings of the United States National Museum

Another earlier, unrelated but similar design was created after World War I, designed for amputees who had lost an arm and had difficulties trying to use multiple utensils. The utensils were also called Nelson knives. The combination allowed them to be able to use a single utensil to cut and eat their food. Knorks are still in use to this day, stated by those who suffer from physical disabilities to be a very helpful tool for eating a meal. For these reasons, it is also claimed to be an important medical invention.

Some more tools resembling a combined knife and fork have also been found in the Andaman Islands, as documented in the Proceedings of the United States National Museum.

Close predecessors of the modern knork include the pastry fork, which appears similar in design and is used to eat pastries.

== Spoon straw ==
Spoon straws are a type of hybrid straw that combines the functions of a straw and a spoon. They can also be referred to as stroons and are used typically for consuming milkshakes, slushies, and other beverages which contain solids or are at least partially solid but melt into a liquid. The spoon straw was created in 1968 by Arthur A. Aykanian, an industrial designer from MIT who studied as a mechanical engineer. It was made for 7-Eleven's Slurpee to allow customers to easily consume the icy parts of the cold drink. The original spoon straw was manufactured by Winkler Flexible Products, Inc., based in Los Angeles.

Spoon straw examples

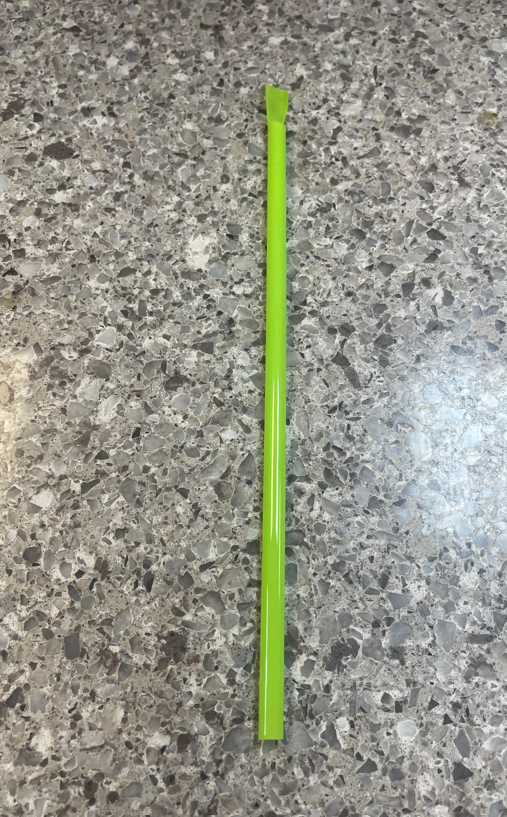
A 7-Eleven Slurpee spoon straw

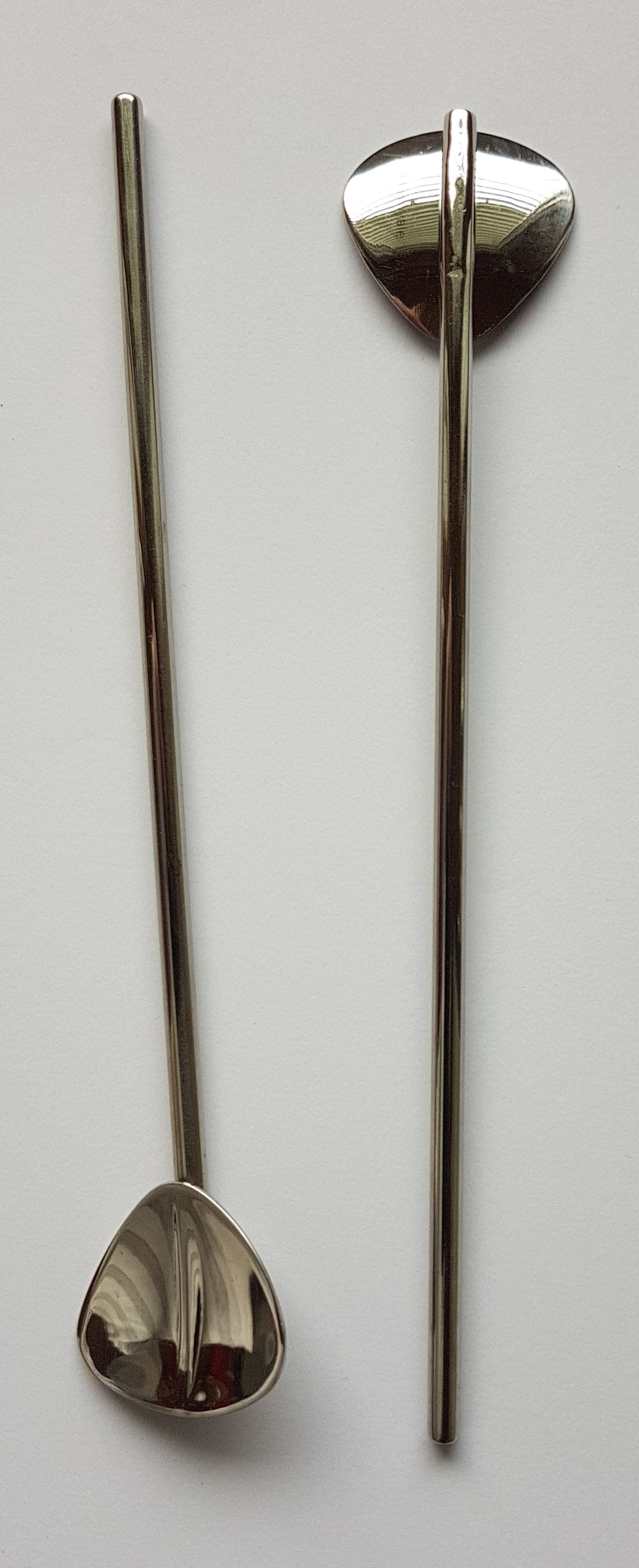
A stainless steel spoon straw

=== Bombilla ===
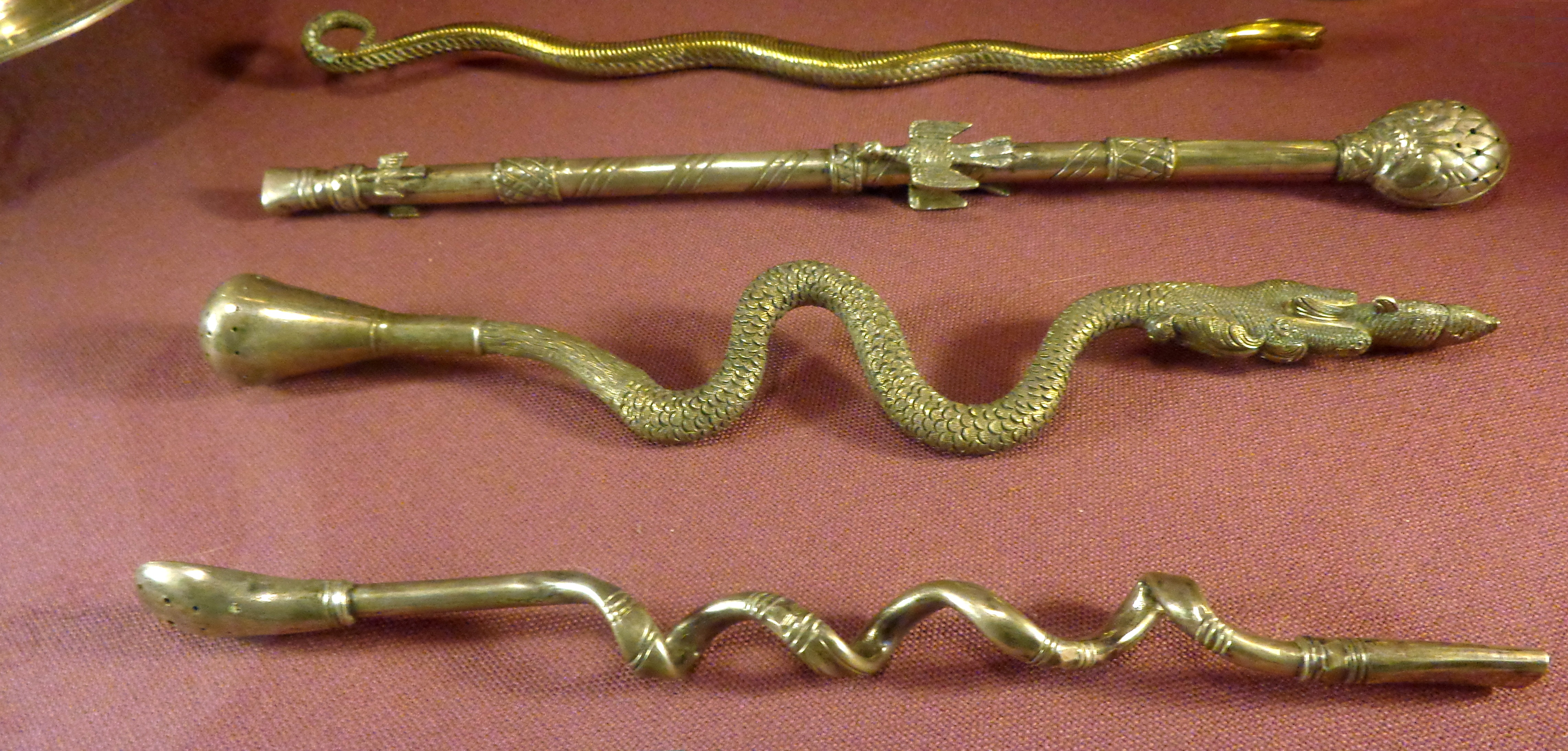
Bombillas

A bombilla is similar to the design of a spoon straw, however, instead of the "spoon" being used to consume solid parts, it is used to filter out solids like leaves, such as those typically found in mate, a type of caffeine-rich herbal drink. It was first used in the 16th century in South America for the purpose of drinking mate so that the consumer wouldn't slurp up the small pieces of leaves that is included in the drink. The utensil is still widely used today. There are other designs of bombillas, each for a different use in drinking mate, and they can be made of different types of materials, such as silver.

== Pizza fork ==
The pizza fork is a combination of a fork and a pizza cutter, allowing the user to slice a pizza and then eat the sliced piece with ease. It was created by Daniel Morvec, who also created and runs Stupidiotic, where it is also sold on the website. A Kickstarter for the utensil was also created, where it claims that it could also be used on pancakes, waffles, steaks, and more, although the starter was unsuccessful.

Other products that combine a fork and a pizza cutter into one utensil include the Nyfork, which also claims to be able to be used with other foods, like meatloaf. It was created by Innovative Products, Inc., and the utensil allows for users to cut their pizzas into small bits without having to use a separate knife and fork. A patent to improve the design of pizza forks is also demonstrated, stating its creation to prevent the injury of users by creating a fender between the pizza cutter and the handle.

== See also ==
- List of eating utensils
- Kitchen utensil
- Spork
- Splayd
- FRED
