= Terrapin fork =

Victorian fork-spoon for eating turtle

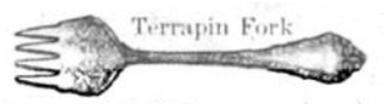
Terrapin fork (1902)

A terrapin fork was a hybrid of spoon and fork, similar to a spork, that was used for eating terrapin stew and other dishes made from turtle meat. It typically has a bowl-like shape with short tines, designed to both spear pieces of meat and scoop the accompanying soup or gelatinous sauce. Overall design was similar to the ice cream fork, but had four tines instead of three. The utensil was most popular during the late 19th and early 20th centuries, a period when terrapin was considered a delicacy in the United States; it is quite rare in the 21st century. A ramekin fork was very similar in shape (although sometimes with pierced-through bowl area), to the point that the 1913 Tiffany & Co.'s Blue Book catalog under the title "Terrapin Forks" stated: "See Ramekin Forks".

== History ==
The terrapin fork emerged during the Victorian era, an age known for its highly specialized and elaborate dining etiquette, which saw the invention of a "numberless" array of eating implements for specific foods. The rise of the terrapin fork is directly linked to the culinary popularity of the diamondback terrapin. In the mid-1700s, terrapin began to be consumed by American colonists, but it was in the 19th century that it became a highly sought-after luxury dish, especially in the Mid-Atlantic states.

Dishes like "Terrapin à la Maryland" became staples on the menus of fine hotels and restaurants. These preparations often involved a rich stew of turtle meat in a creamy, sherry-laced sauce. The unique consistency of these dishes—part solid, part liquid—necessitated a specialized utensil. The terrapin fork was developed to meet this need, allowing diners to handle both the meat and the broth with a single implement. Major American silver companies, like Towle, Durgin, and Whiting, produced ornate terrapin forks as part of their silver flatware sets since the 1890s.

== Design ==
The terrapin fork is a hybrid utensil. Its bowl is deeper than a standard fork but shallower than a spoon, and it features four short, broad tines at the tip. This design allowed the user to spear chunks of terrapin meat while also scooping up the rich sauce or soup that accompanied it. It is considered a forerunner of the modern spork.

== Decline in use ==
The use of the terrapin fork declined in the early 20th century along with the popularity of terrapin as a food. Overhunting had severely depleted the wild terrapin populations, causing prices to skyrocket and making the dish unaffordable for many. Furthermore, the advent of Prohibition in 1920 dealt a major blow to classic terrapin recipes, as alcohol was an essential ingredient. As terrapin dishes disappeared from menus, the specialized fork for eating them became obsolete. Today, terrapin forks are collector's items, valued as historical artifacts of a specific culinary era.

== Ramekin fork ==
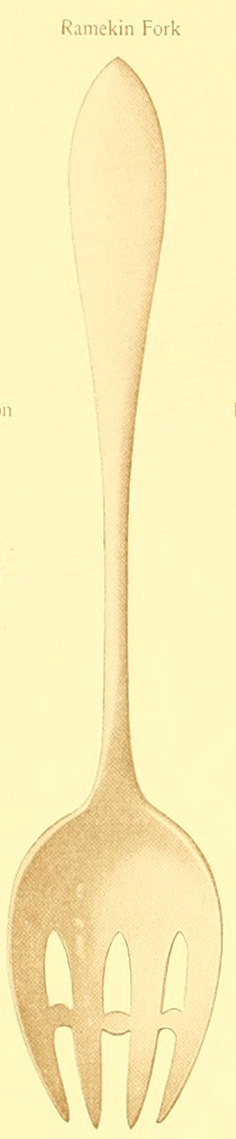
Ramekin fork by Towle Mfg. Company (1907)

Ramekin forks were manufactured since the 1890s by a few American factories and were similar in size and shape to the terrapin forks. However, their bowls were often pierced in few places. This utensil was used for consumption of ham or seafood mixed with a rich sauce in a ramekin cup. The habit of eating ramekin food died out before the First World War, and it is a quite rare item, with modern pieces occasionally manufactured by sawing off parts of a tea spoon.

== See also ==
- Oyster fork
- Ice cream fork

== Sources ==
- Badger, Curtis (n.d.). "From Delicacy to Decline: A Tale of the Diamond-Backed Terrapin". Virginia Department of Wildlife Resources.
- Bryson, Bill (2010). At Home: A Short History of Private Life. Doubleday. ISBN 978-0-7679-1938-8.
- Hood, W. Edmund; Hood, William P.; Berlin, Roslyn; Wawrynek, Edward (1999). Tiffany Silver Flatware 1845-1905: When Dining was an Art. Antique Collectors' Club. ISBN 978-1-85149-325-8.
- Schollander, Wendell; Schollander, Wes (2002). Forgotten Elegance: The Art, Artifacts, and Peculiar History of Victorian and Edwardian Entertaining in America. Bloomsbury Academic. ISBN 978-0-313-31685-2.
- Walker, Raven D.; Jones, Glenn A. (2018-04-01). "Consumer-Driven Depletion of the Northern Diamondback Terrapin in Chesapeake Bay". Marine and Coastal Fisheries. 10 (2): 132–143. doi:10.1002/mcf2.10009. ISSN 1942-5120.
