= Spork =

Item of cutlery combining a spoon and fork

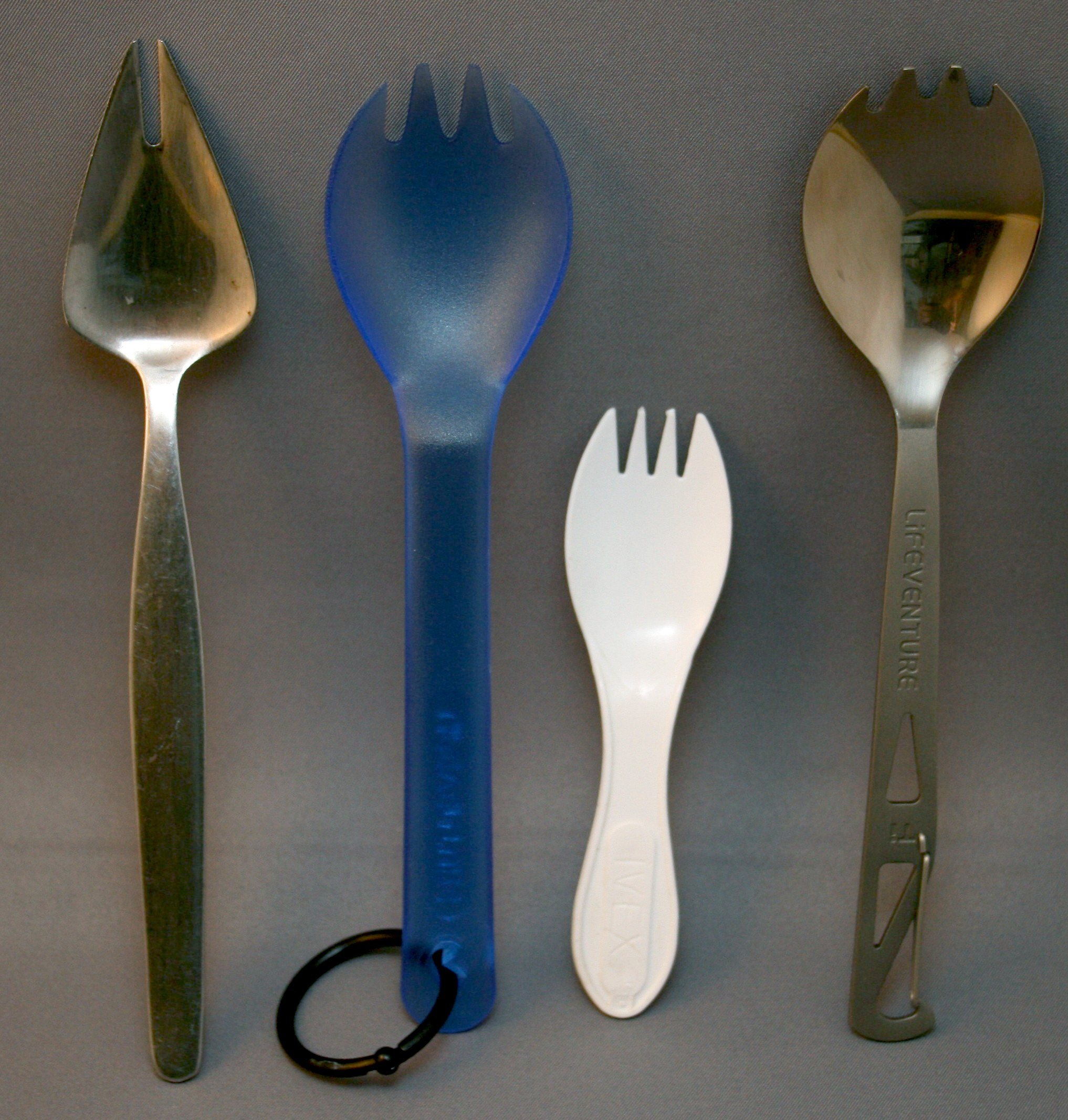
Four types of sporks

A spork is a form of cutlery and combination utensil taking the form of a spoon-like scoop with two to four fork-like tines. Spork-like utensils, such as the terrapin fork or ice cream fork, have been manufactured since the late 19th century; patents for spork-like designs date back to at least 1874. Sporks are commonly used by fast food restaurants, schools, prisons, militaries, backpackers, and airlines.

The word spork is a portmanteau of spoon and fork. It appeared in the 1909 supplement to the Century Dictionary, where it was described as a trade name and "a 'portmanteau-word' applied to a long, slender spoon having, at the end of the bowl, projections resembling the tines of a fork". The word "spork" was later registered as a trademark in the U.S. and the UK.

A utensil with a fork on one end and a spoon on the other is also known as a spork.

== History ==
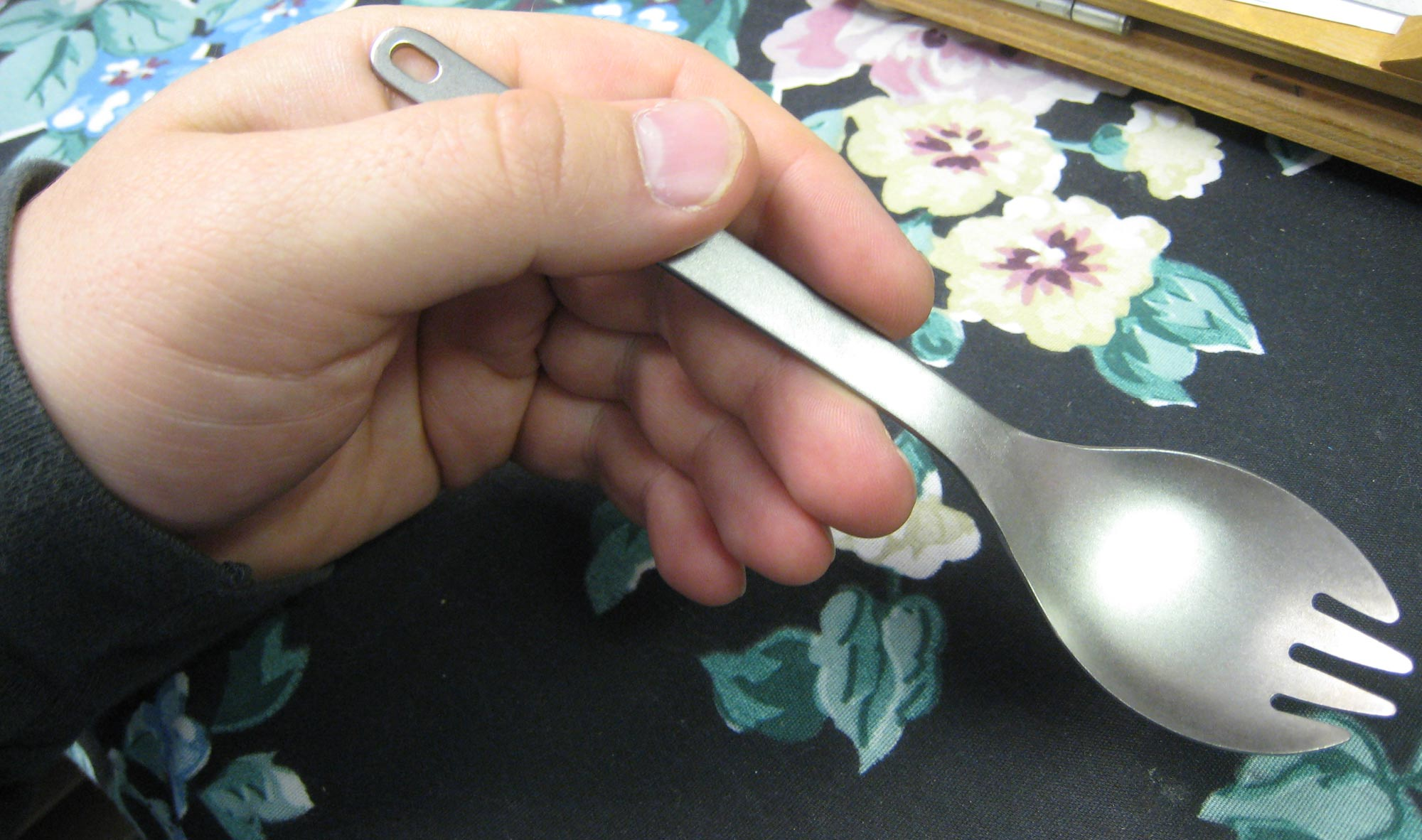
A lightweight Snow Peak brand titanium spork

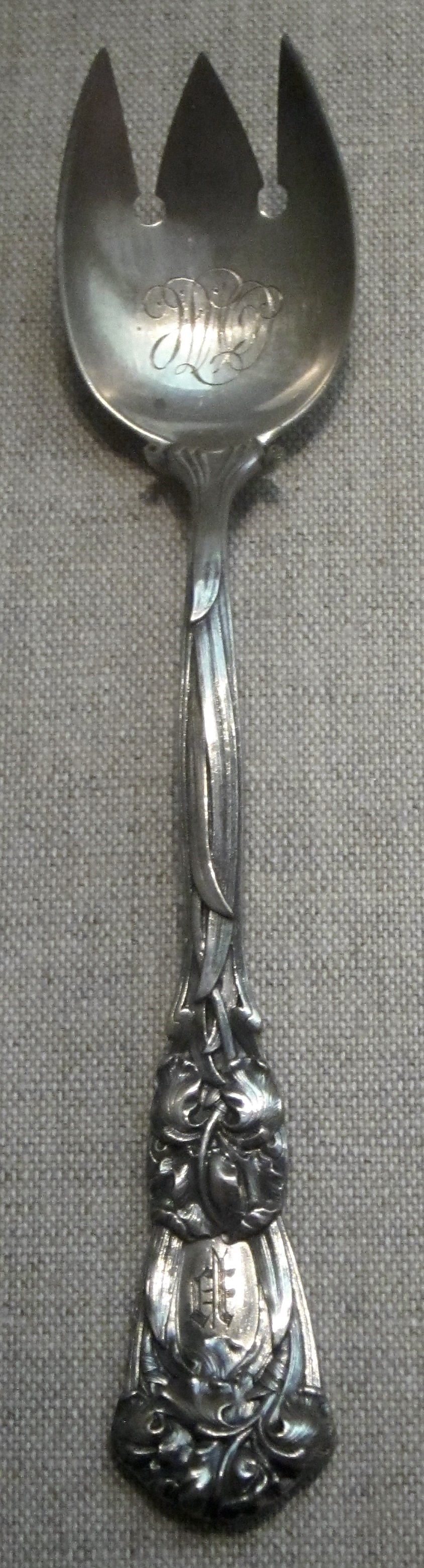
An ice cream fork from the early 20th century

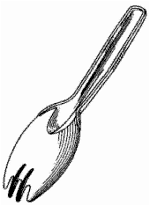
Drawing from a 1998 spork design patent

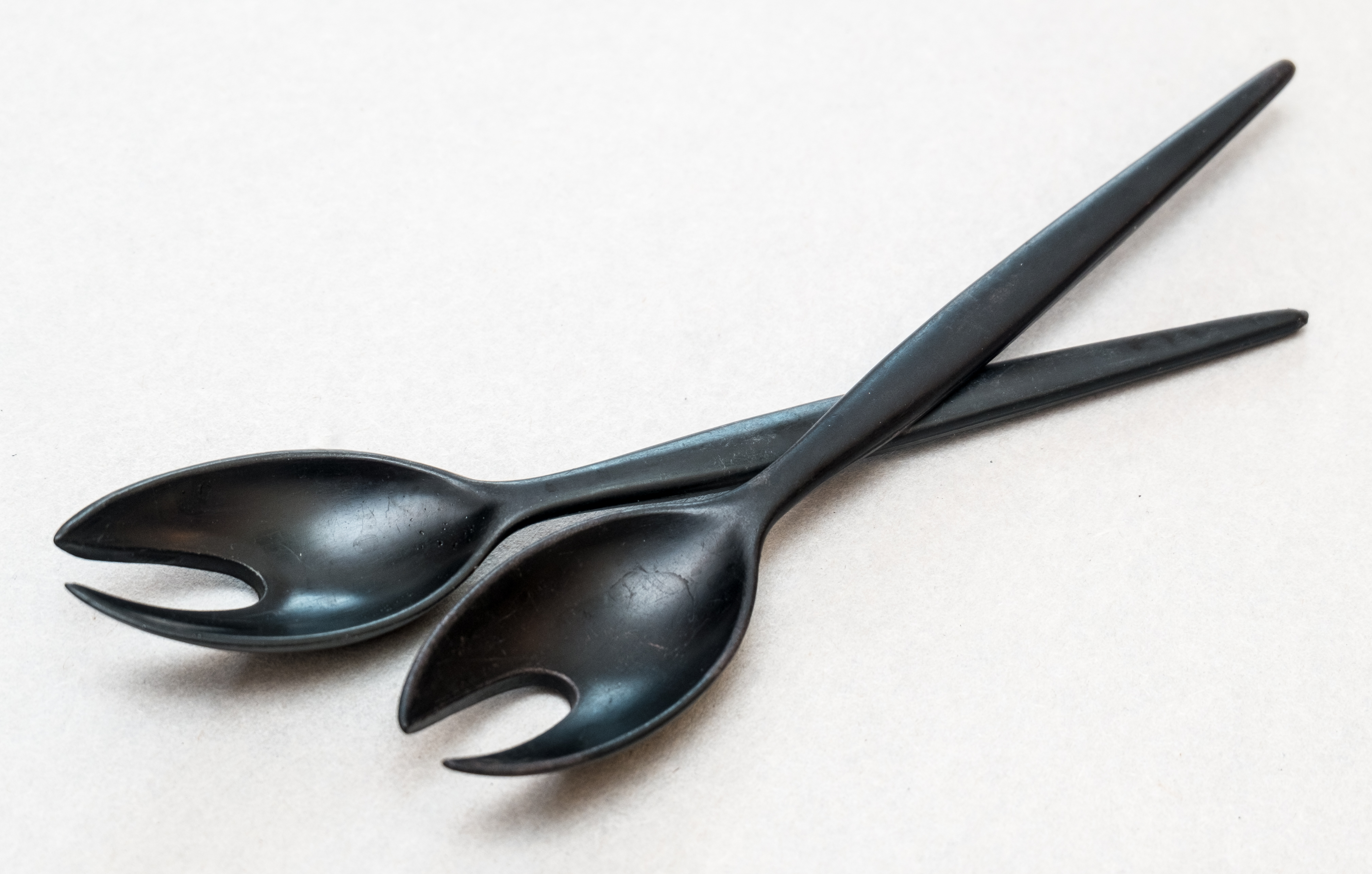
Special sporks for salad

In the U.S., patents for sporks and proto-sporks have been issued. A combined spoon, fork, and knife closely resembling the modern spork was invented by Samuel W. Francis and issued US patent 147,119 on February 3, 1874. Other early patents predating the modern spork include US patent 904,553, for a "cutting spoon", granted on November 24, 1908, to Harry L. McCoy and US patent 1,044,869, for a spoon with a tined edge, granted to Frank Emmenegger in November 1912. Many of these inventions predated the use of the term "spork". Given this significant prior art, the basic concept of combining aspects of a spoon and fork is well established; more modern patents have limited themselves to the specific implementation and appearance of the spork. These design patents do not prevent anyone from designing and manufacturing a different version of a spork. Examples of modern U.S. design patents for sporks include patent number D247,153 issued in February 1978 and patent D388,664 issued in January 1998.

== Etymology ==
The word "spork" originated in the early 20th century to describe such devices. In 1951, Hyde W. Ballard of Westtown, Pennsylvania, filed an application with the United States Patent Office (USPO, now the United States Patent and Trademark Office) to register "Spork" as a trademark for a combination spoon and fork made of stainless steel. The Van Brode Milling Company subsequently registered SPORK for a combination plastic spoon, fork and knife at the USPO on October 27, 1970, but the registration expired 20 years later. The word Spork accompanied by a stylised design is registered in the US in relation to hand tools, in the name of a UK-based individual.

In the UK, Plastico Limited registered "Spork" as a trademark in relation to cutlery with effect from September 18, 1975, (reg. no. 1052291, now expired). The trademark is also registered in the UK in relation to gardening tools in the name of the same UK based individual who owns US trademark registration no. 2514381. Another British company, Lifeventure, sells titanium and plastic versions using the name "Forkspoon".

In an unsuccessful lawsuit in 1999 where the company Regalzone sought to invalidate Plastico Limited's UK registration for Spork, Justice Neuberger wrote:

I accept that the word Spork involves a clever idea of making a single word by eliding the beginning of the word spoon and the end of the word fork. The fact that it is clever and the fact that the meaning of Spork could be said to be obvious once it is explained does not mean that it is obvious what it is. Indeed, I would have thought that if one asked a person in 1975 what a Spork was, he or she would not know. If one then explained what it was and how the word came about, one might then be told that it was obvious or that it was clever.

== Materials and uses ==
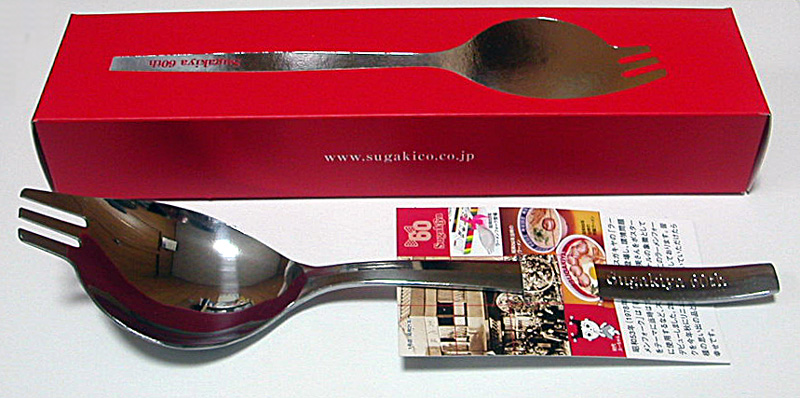
A Japanese spork

Materials such as stainless steel, silver, aluminum, titanium, copper and polycarbonate plastic have been used in spork manufacturing. Plastic sporks are common in prisons in the United States because they are difficult to form into shiv-type weapons to attack other inmates. Prepackaged meals may come with a disposable plastic spork. Sporks are also frequently used by backpackers, Scouts and other outdoorspeople as they are a lightweight and space-saving alternative to carrying both a fork and spoon.

== See also ==
- Grapefruit spoon – Kind of spoon intended for use with citrus fruit
- Combination eating utensils – Utensils with hybrid traits, such as sporks and knorks
- Lusikkahaarukka – Spoon-fork combination (spoon-fork in Finnish)
- Pastry fork – Eating utensil
- Runcible spoon – Nonsense word created by Edward Lear
- Splayd – Combination spoon, knife and fork utensil
