= Splayd =

Combination spoon, knife and fork utensil

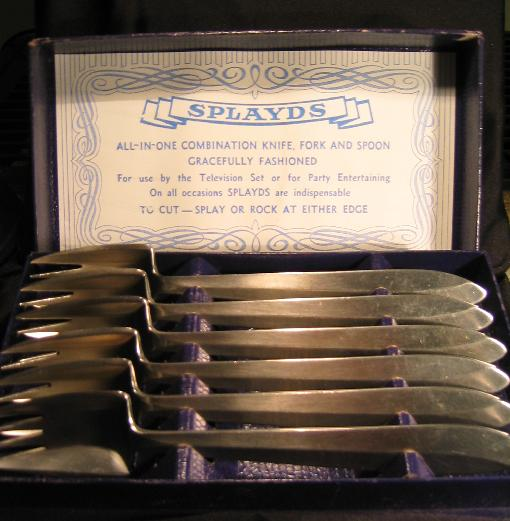
Splayds (or spknorks) are a combination of fork, knife and spoon in one utensil.

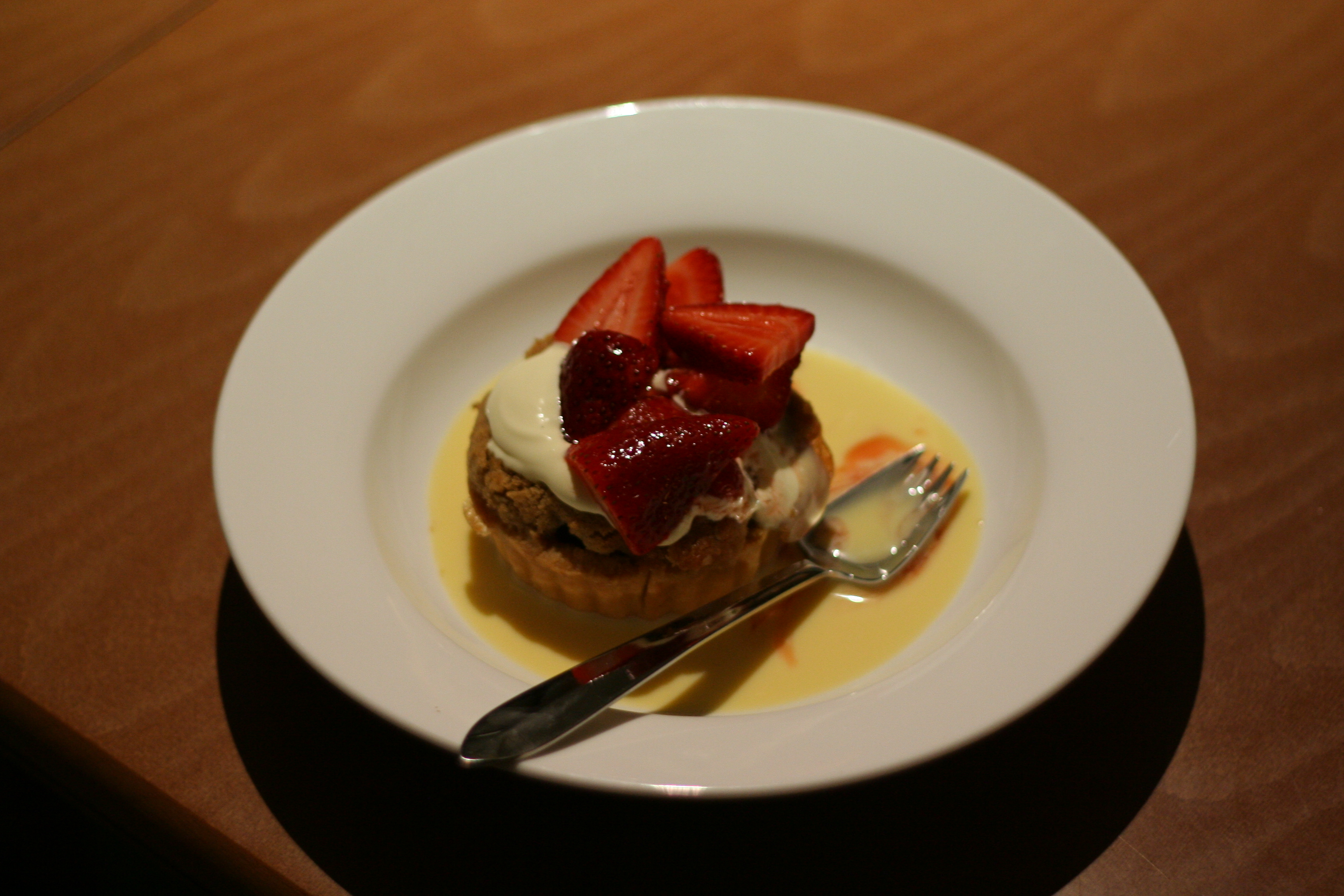
A splayd beside a tart

A splayd is an eating utensil which combines the functions of a spoon, knife and fork. It was invented by William McArthur in the 1940s in Sydney, New South Wales, Australia. His wife, Suzanne McArthur was the initial public face and marketer of the splayd. There are several manufacturers.

In addition to an overall spoon shape with four fork tines, it has two hard, flat edges on either side, suitable for cutting through soft food. They often have a geometric rather than rounded bowl, with two longitudinal folds in the metal.

The UK licensee for the manufacturing and distribution of splayds during the 1970s was Viners of Sheffield. At that time they were one of the biggest cutlery manufacturers in Great Britain.

The splayd has medical uses, having been recommended as a solution for feeding difficulties following or during treatment of the arm and being part of the (discontinued) Selectagrip system of utensils with customisable handles for people who have trouble using regular utensils. It was also reportedly a popular wedding gift in Australia in the 1950s and 1960s.

== See also ==
- Spork
- Combination eating utensils
