= Italia Marittima =

Shipping company

Italia Marittima S.p.A.
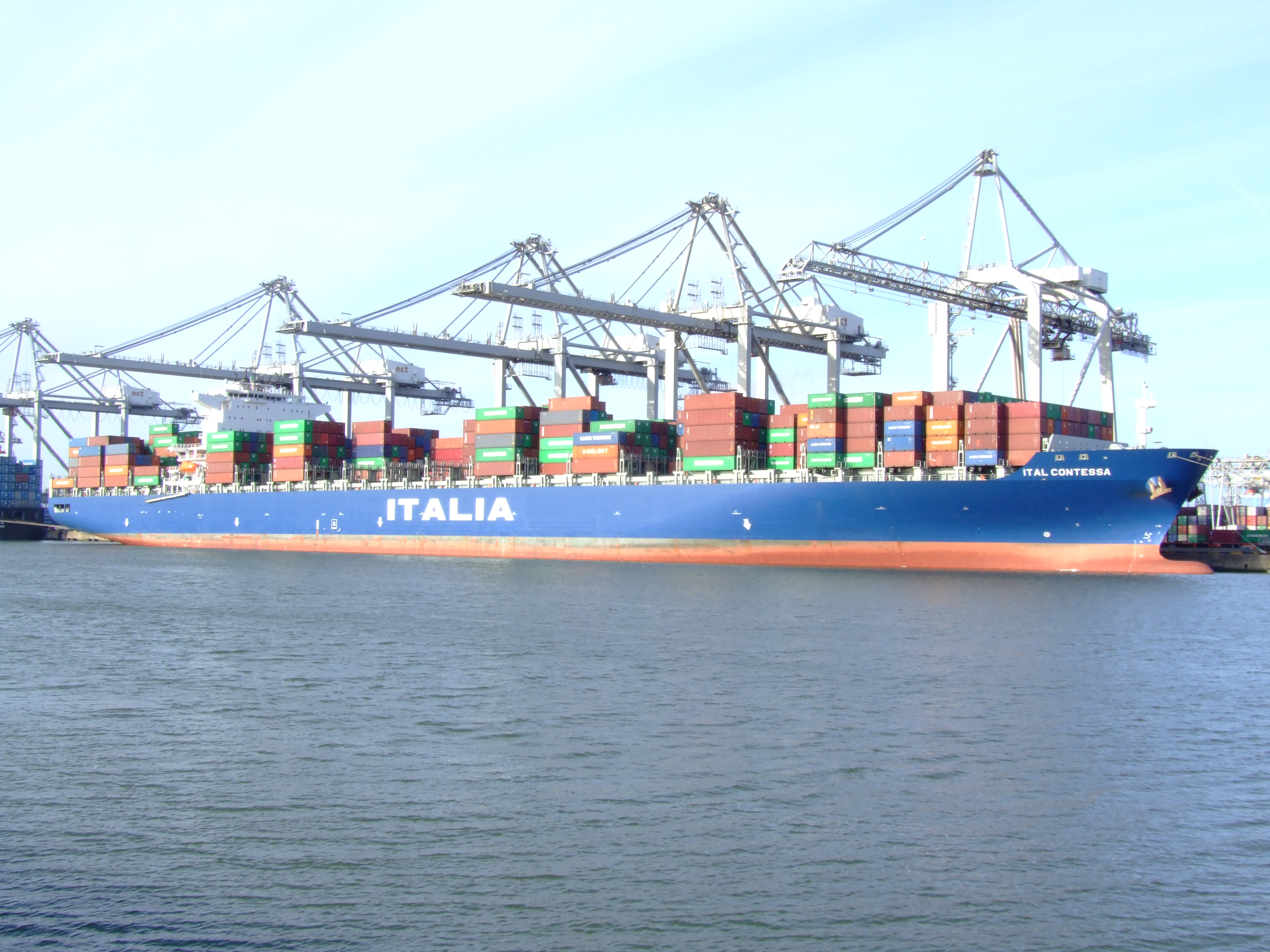
- Company type: Public company
- Founded: Trieste, Austrian Empire (1836)
- Headquarters: Trieste, Italy
- Products: Commercial transport
- Website: www.italiamarittima.it

Italia Marittima S.p.A., founded as Österreichischer Lloyd in 1833 and named Lloyd Triestino from 1919 until 2006, is a shipping company with its head office in Trieste, Italy, and run by Evergreen Marine Corporation.

== History ==
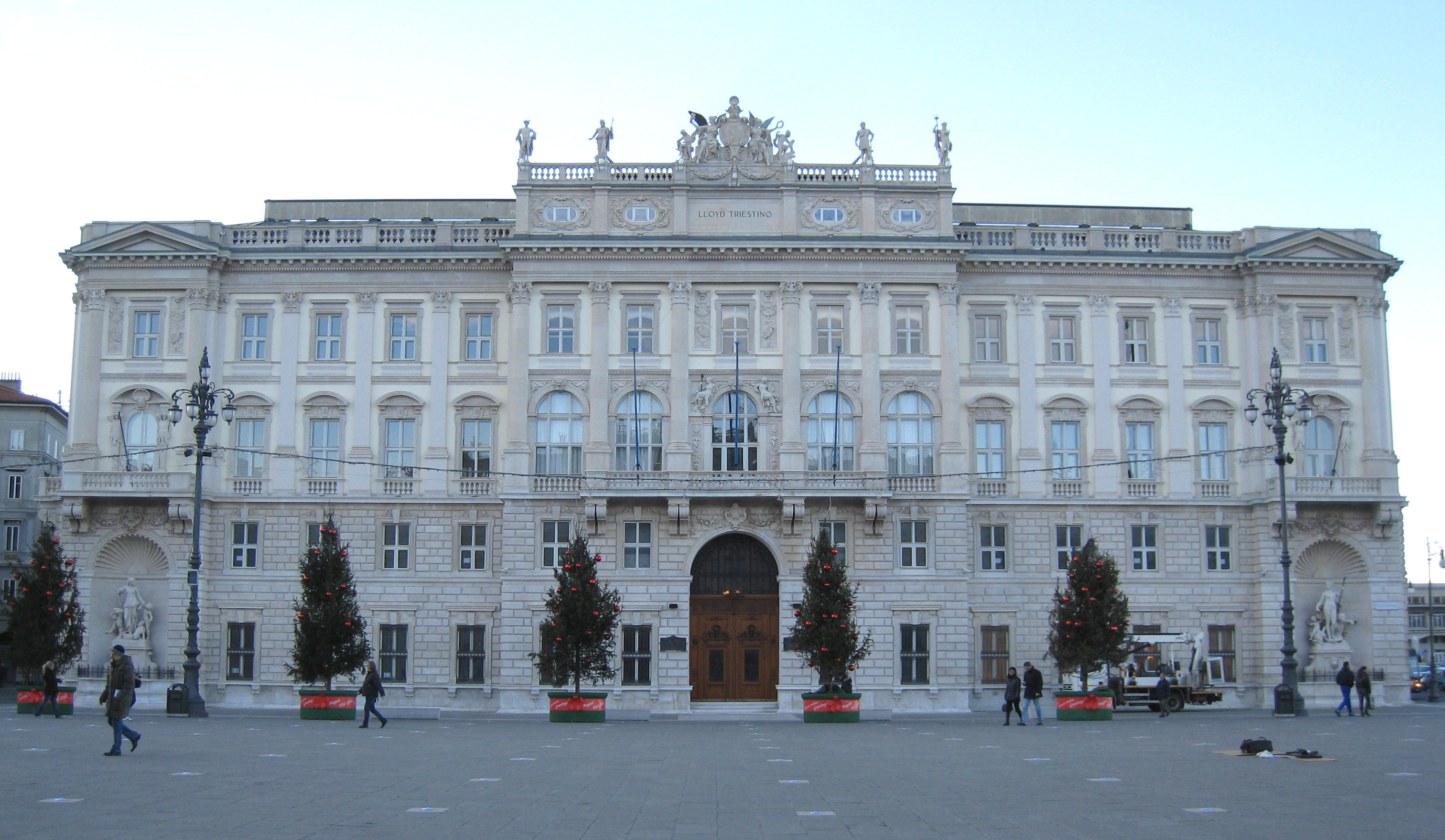
Former head office at the corner of Piazza Unità d'Italia and the Trieste seafront. The building displays the name "Lloyd Triestino" below the emblem.

=== Österreichischer Lloyd ===
The company was founded as Österreichischer Lloyd (or "Austrian Lloyd") as an insurance company in 1833. In 1836 the company went into shipping. It became one of the world's biggest shipping companies by managing most oversea trade and passenger travel of Austria-Hungary until 1918. The Austrian Lloyd was running regular services from Trieste to the Near East, India, China and the Far East, Brazil, the US and Northern Europe. It was one of the first companies to use steam ships.

=== Lloyd Triestino ===
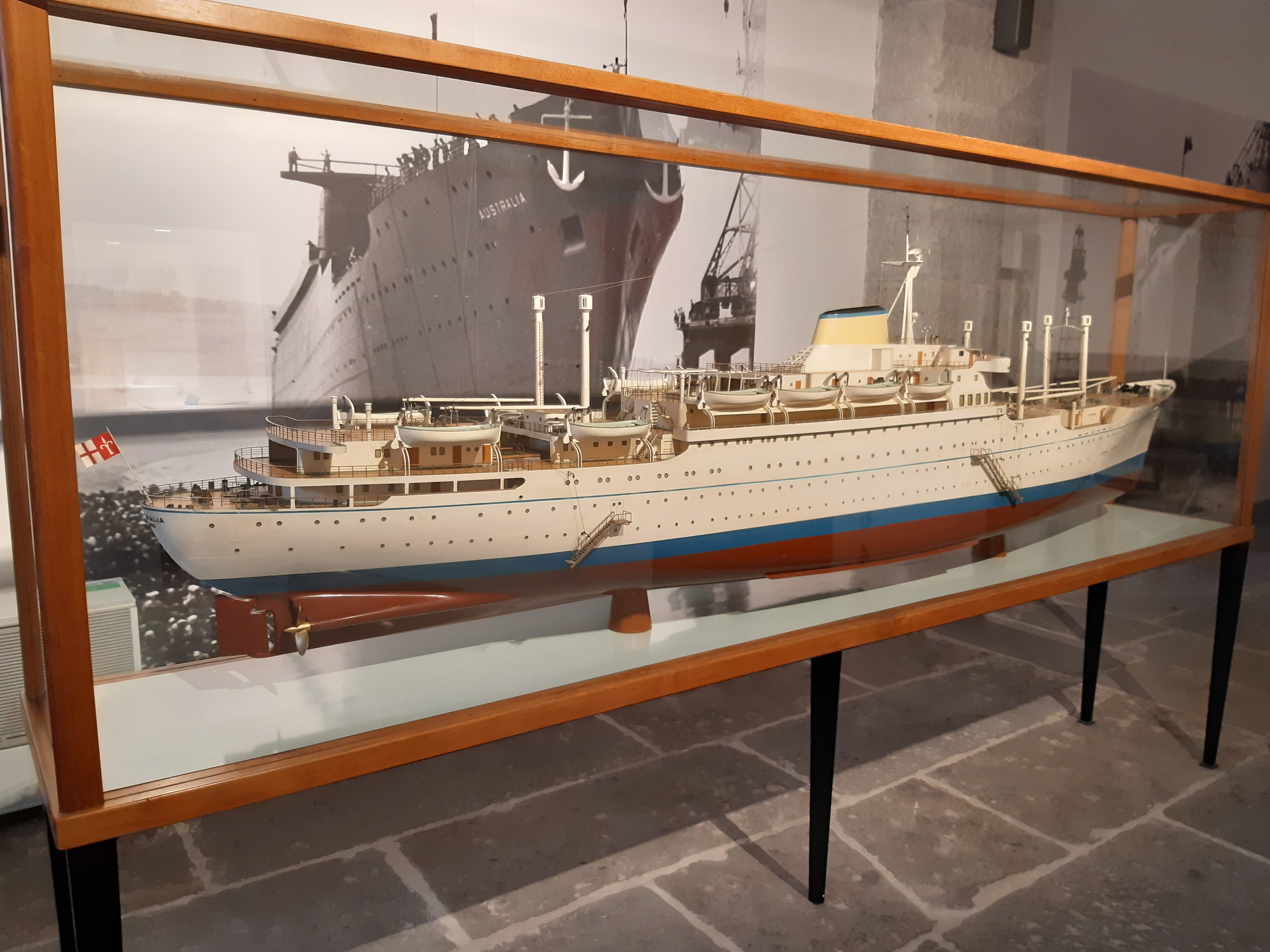
SS Australia (1950), one of the "Lloyd Triestino trio" liners for the Australia route. Model in Trieste Maritime Museum.

Österreichischer Lloyd's name was changed to Lloyd Triestino and the company restructured in 1919, when Trieste became a part of Italy, after serious losses during World War I. By the end of the 1930s, Lloyd Triestino was once again a major world shipping power, owning a fleet of 85 vessels with 17 services to east Africa, southern Africa, Asia, and Australia. The company was crippled by the devastation of World War II, losing 68 ships and 1,000 sailors. At the end, they were reduced to a fleet of just five ships and were again faced with a massive recovery operation. In 1950, Lloyd Triestino launched three 13,140 ton ocean-going passenger liners for its service to Australia: the Australia, the Oceania, and the Neptunia. All three were replaced by two new liners, the Guglielmo Marconi and the Galileo Galilei, in 1963. By 1956, the fleet had grown to 31 ships. A total of 199 ships were owned by Lloyd Triestino between 1919 and 2006. The illustrated travel magazine Sul Mare (Italian for 'On the Sea') was distributed on Lloyd's ships from March 1925 to 1944, and revived after the Second World War; 148 issues were produced.

=== Partnership with Evergreen Marine ===
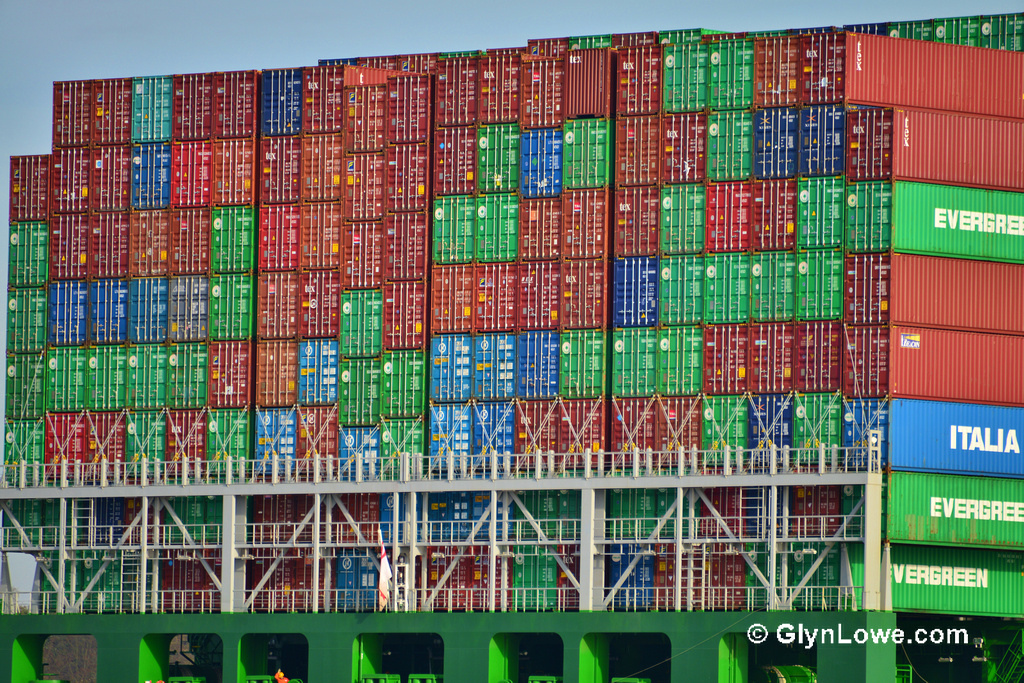
ITALIA containers (in blue) mixed in with Evergreen containers (in green) on a ship

Lloyd Triestino entered into a partnership with Taiwanese shipping giant, Evergreen Marine, Corp., in 1993. The partnership has grown over the years, and now includes Evergreen's British-based line, Hatsu Marine, created in 2000.

=== Italia Marittima ===
On March 1, 2006, the Lloyd Triestino name was retired and the company was renamed Italia Marittima. Ship names were changed from the prefix "LT" to "Ital" (e.g., LT Cortesia to Ital Contessa).

== See also ==
- Port of Trieste
