= Lloyd Triestino =

Italian shipping company

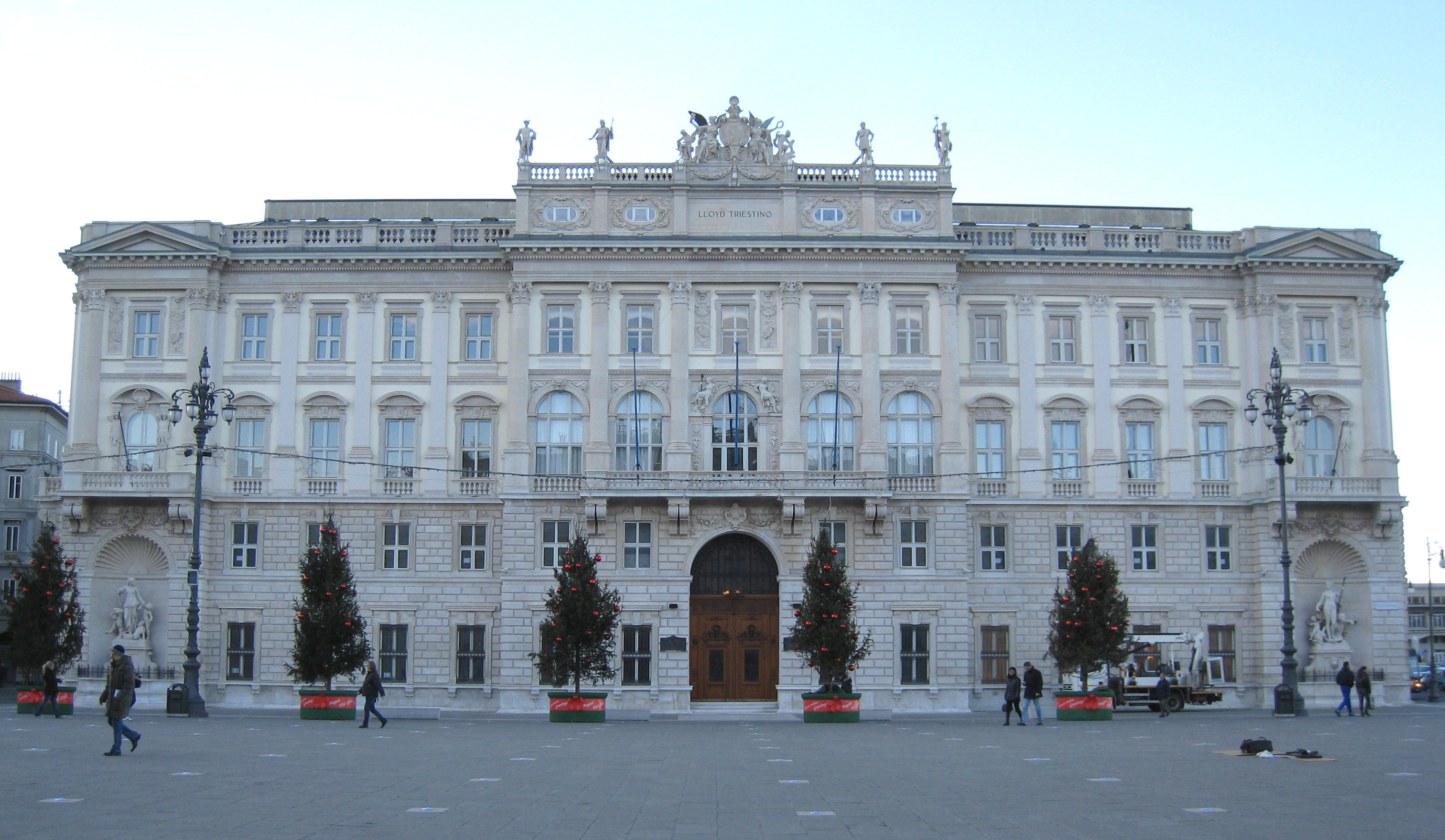
Former head office at the corner of Piazza Unità d'Italia and the Trieste seafront. The building displays the name "Lloyd Triestino" below the emblem.

Lloyd Triestino was a major shipping company, created in 1919 when the city of Trieste became part of Italy in the settlement after the First World War. It ran passenger services on ocean liners around the world. Seriously harmed by Second World War, in which it lost 68 ships, it recovered to run passenger services with new ships on routes as far as Australia. In 2006, with the business by then mainly container freight, the company's name was changed to Italia Marittima.

== Background ==
The company was founded as Österreichischer Lloyd (also called Lloyd Austriaco or "Austrian Lloyd") as an insurance company in 1833. In 1836 the company went into shipping. It became one of the world's biggest shipping companies by managing most of Austria-Hungary's overseas trade and passenger travel until 1918. It ran regular services from Trieste to the Near East, India, China and the Far East, Brazil, the US and Northern Europe. It was one of the first companies to use steamships.

== Company ==
=== Between the wars ===
SS Duilio (maiden voyage 1923), chartered from Italian Line 1933, acquired 1936, one of Lloyd Triestino's largest ships of the period, at 24,881 GRT

Österreichischer Lloyd's name was changed to Lloyd Triestino in 1919, when Trieste became a part of Italy. At that time, the company faced major restructuring to recover losses incurred during World War I. During this period (1919/21), special chartered sea voyages were undertaken, covering Asia, Africa and Oceania, with very distinguished passengers on board, in parallel with the delayed founding of the League of Nations. By the end of the 1930s, Lloyd Triestino, with its offshoot Italia di Navigazione, was once again a major world shipping power, owning a fleet of 85 vessels with 17 services to east Africa, southern Africa, Asia, and Australia.

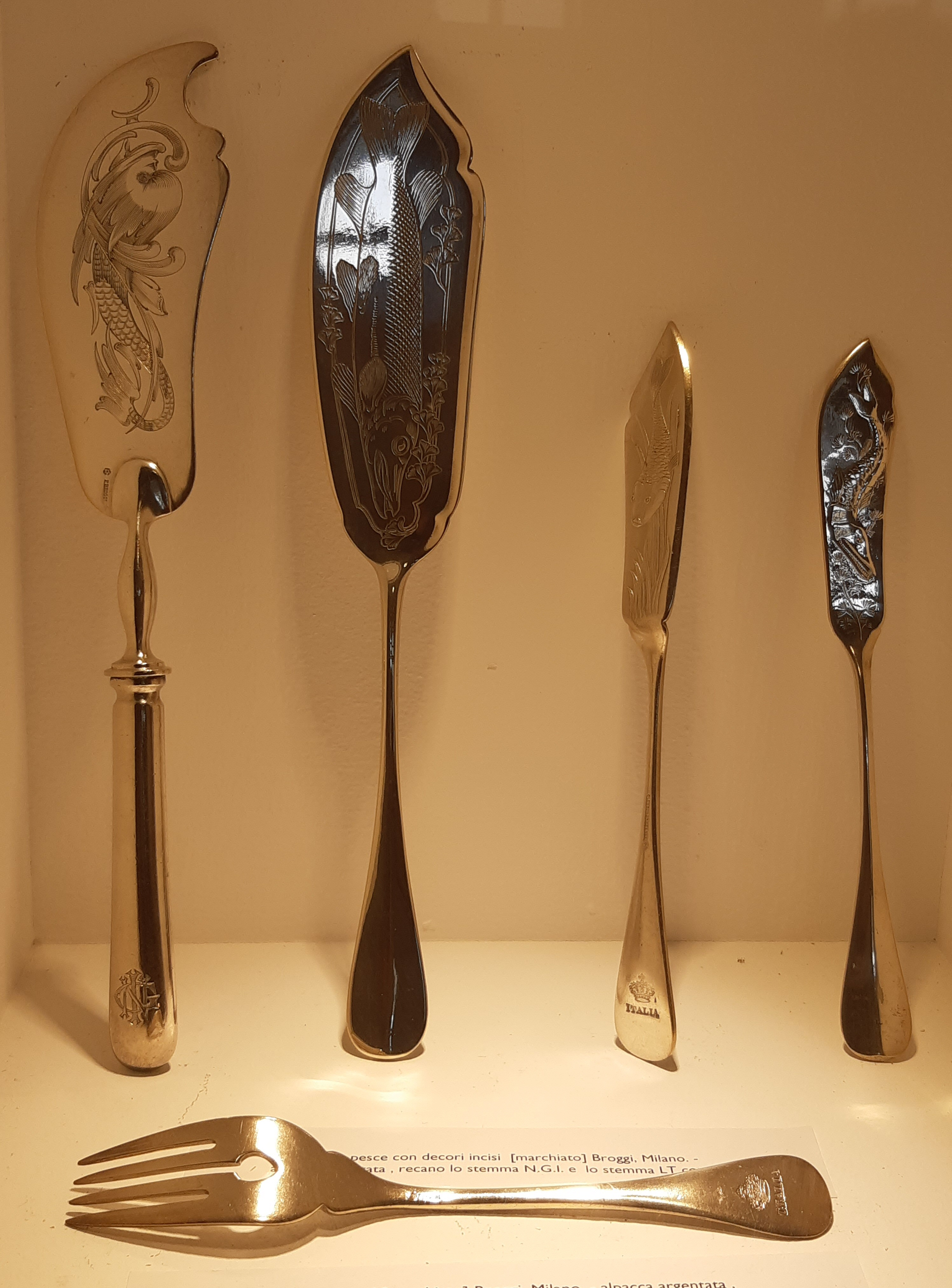
Four kinds of fish knife for passengers on SS Victoria, 1931

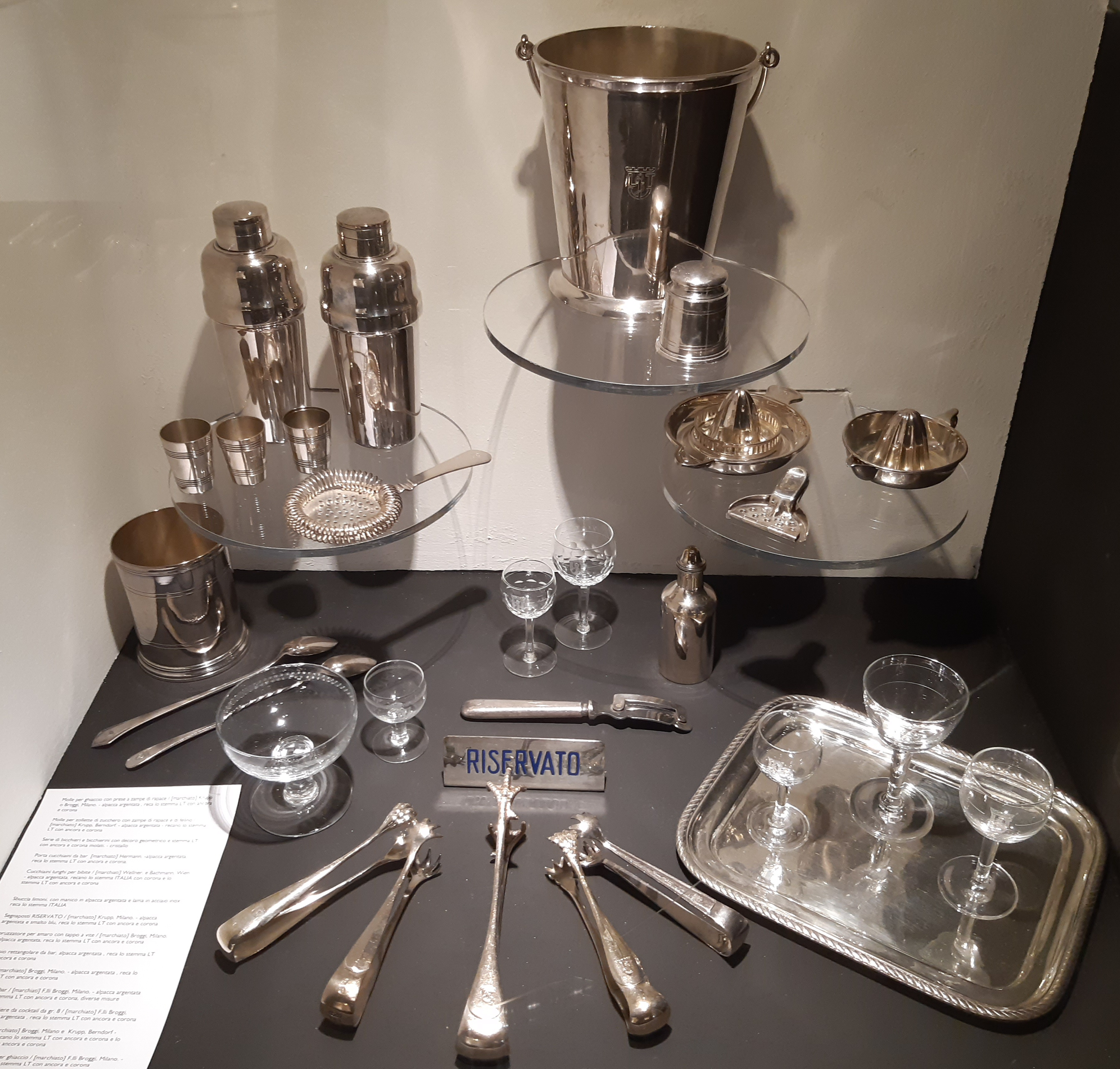
Cocktail service for passengers on SS Victoria, 1931

=== Second World War and after ===
The company was crippled by the devastation of the Second World War, losing 68 ships and 1,000 sailors, including one of its most recent and famous ship, the MS Victoria which was sunk in January 1942 by British torpedoes off the coast of Libya. At the end, they were reduced to a fleet of just five ships, and were again faced with a massive recovery operation.

In 1950, Lloyd Triestino launched three 13,140 GRT ocean-going passenger liners for its service to Australia: the Australia, the Oceania, and the Neptunia. All three were moved to the Italian Line in 1963, replaced by two new liners, the Guglielmo Marconi and the Galileo Galilei, each twice the size of the "trio" ships at 27,905 GRT. By 1956, the fleet had grown to 31 ships. A total of 199 ships were owned by Lloyd Triestino between 1919 and 2006.

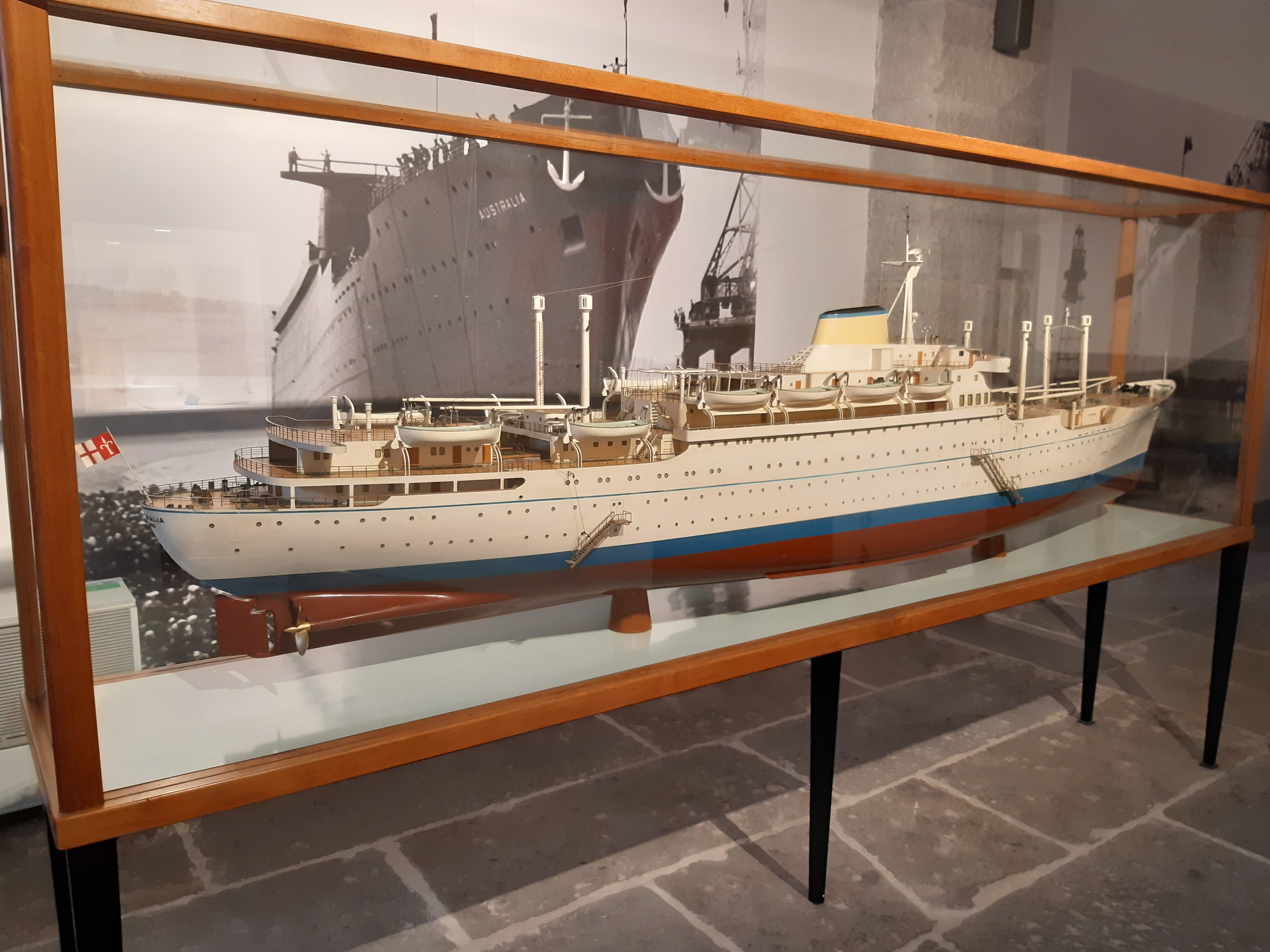
SS Australia (1950), one of the "Lloyd Triestino trio" liners for the Australia route. Model in Trieste Maritime Museum.

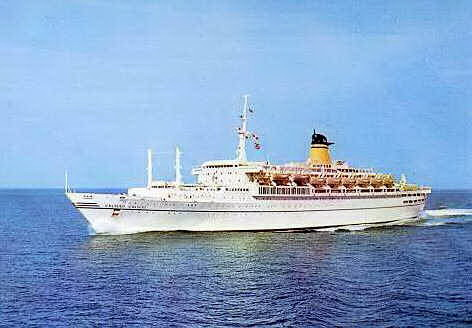
SS Guglielmo Marconi, launched 1961, maiden voyage 1963, one of the two liners that replaced the trio in 1963.

== Sul Mare magazine ==
The illustrated travel magazine Sul Mare (Italian for 'On the Sea') was distributed on Lloyd's ships and other outlets from March 1925 to 1944, and revived after the Second World War; 148 issues were produced. Their covers were decorated with four-colour illustrations by Italian artists, many of them from Trieste, including Giorgio Settala, Vittorio Cocever, Gianni Brumatti, Glauco Cambon}, Augusto Černigoj, Marcello Claris, Marcello Dudovich, Ugo Flumiani, Giovanni Giordano Lanza, Lauro Laghi, Piero Lucano, Guido Marussig, Argio Orell, and Antonio Quaiatti. The contents were written in Italian, French, English, and German.

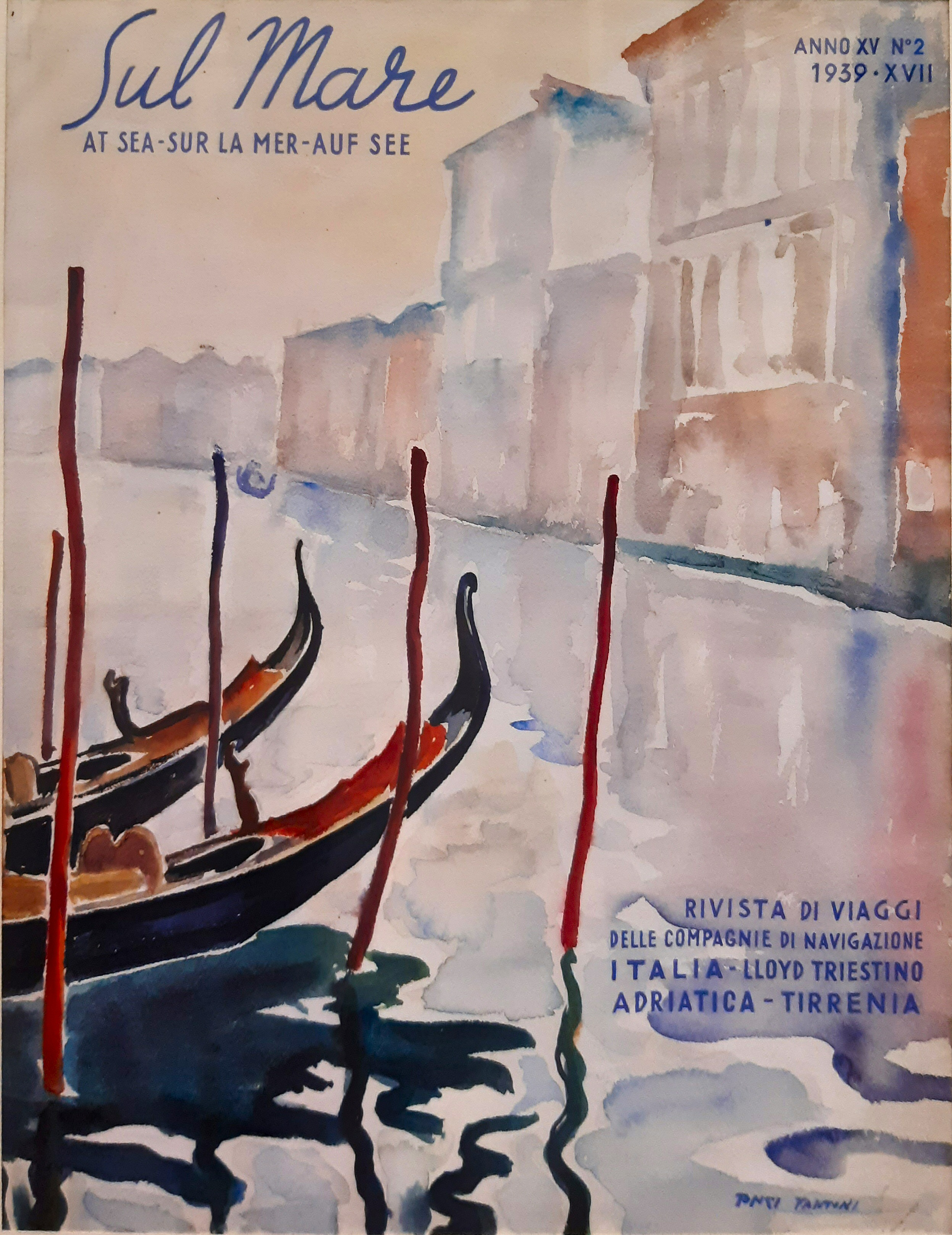
Lloyd Triestino's Sul Mare magazine cover of Venice Canal and Gondolas 1939 by Tonci Fantoni (1898-1943)

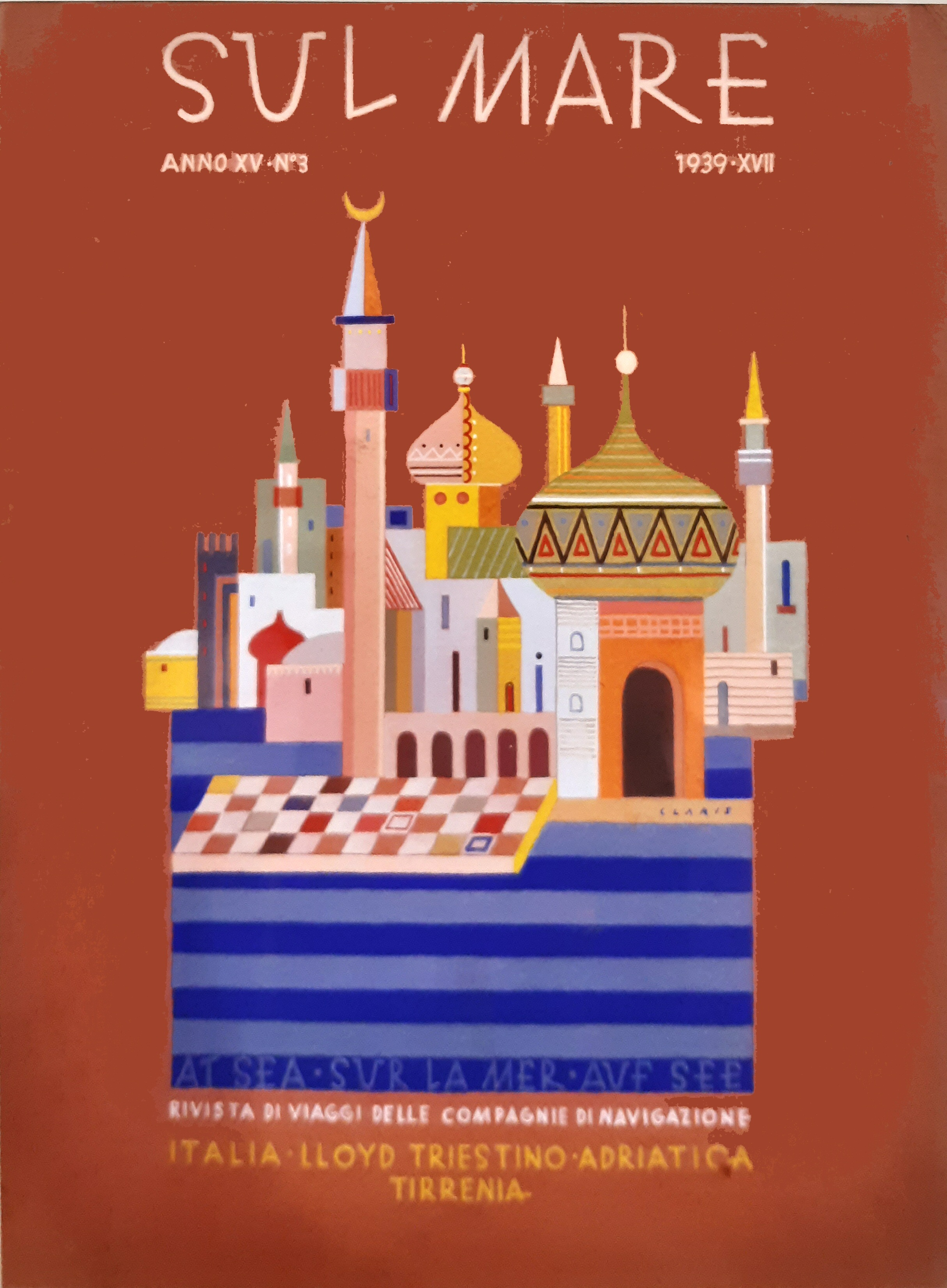
Sul Mare magazine cover of Middle-east 1939 by Marcello Claris (1897-1949)

== Partnership with Evergreen Marine ==
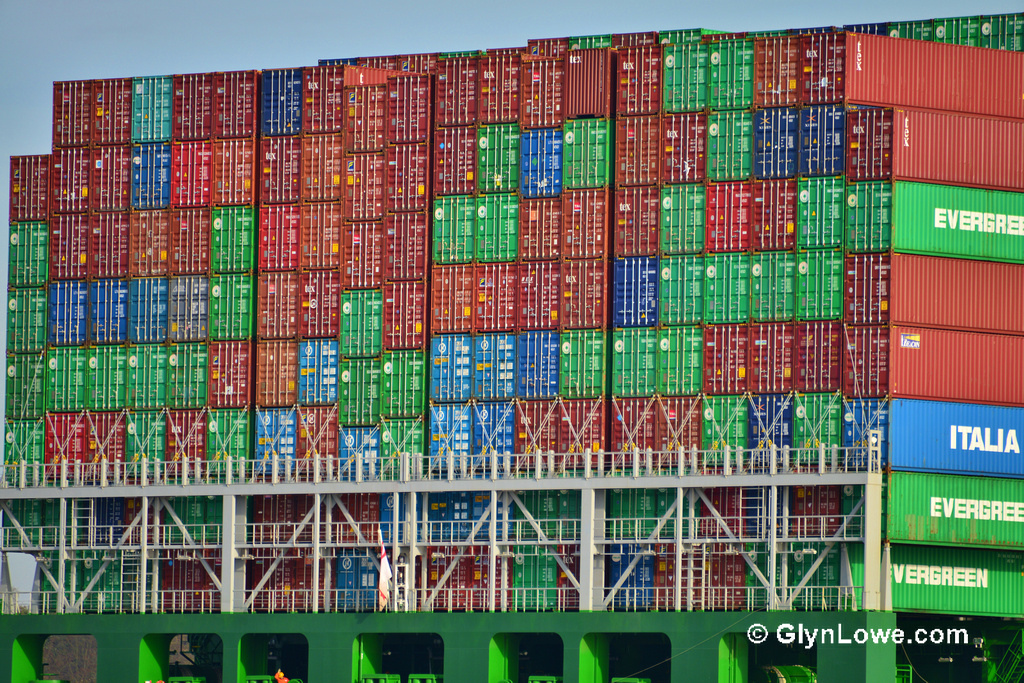
ITALIA containers (in blue) mixed in with Evergreen containers (in green) on a ship

Lloyd Triestino entered into a partnership with Taiwanese shipping giant, Evergreen Marine, Corp., in 1993.

The partnership grew over the years, until Evergreen bought Lloyd Triestino outright in 1998, running it in parallel to its other European affiliate, the British-based line Hatsu Marine, created in 2000.

== Successor company ==
On March 1, 2006, Lloyd Triestino's name was changed to Italia Marittima. Ship names were changed from the prefix "LT" to "Ital" (e.g., LT Cortesia to Ital Contessa).
