= Fish slice (disambiguation) =

Fish slice may refer to:

- Fish slice, a dish similar to fishcake
- Fish slice (kitchen utensil), a serving implement, related to spatula
