= Seafood fork =

Seafood fork could refer to:

- Fish fork
- Oyster fork
- Crab fork
