= LT Cortesia-class container ship =

Container ship class

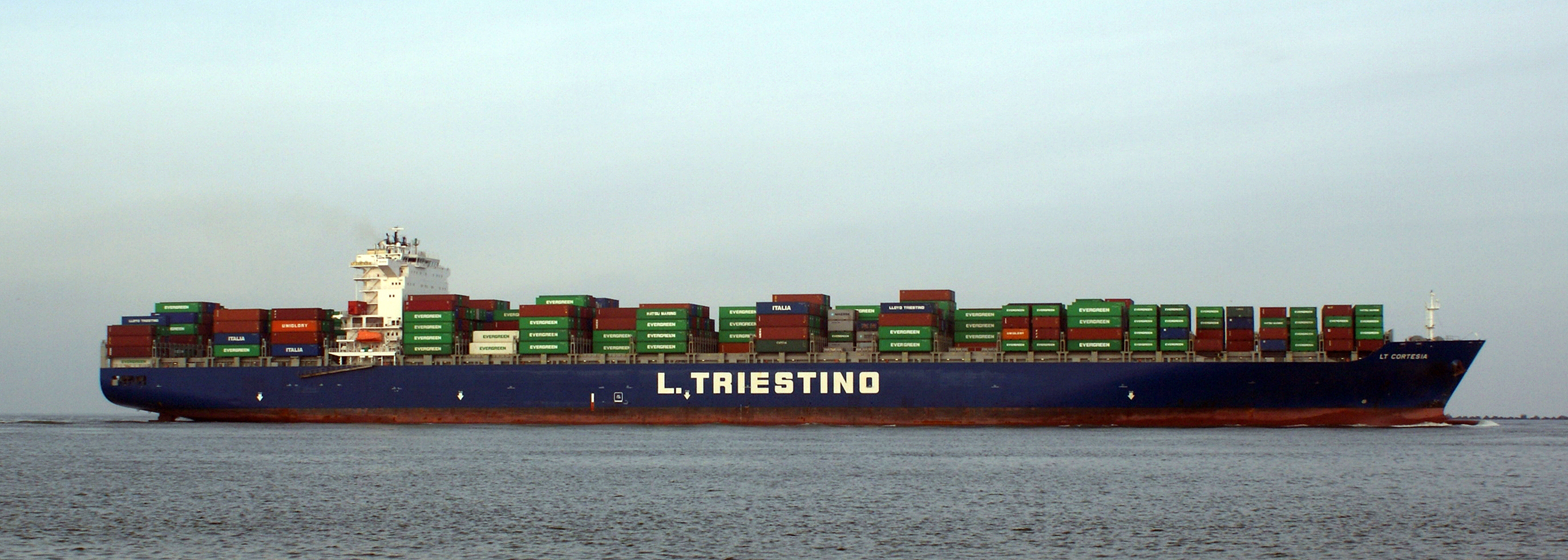
- LT Cortesia entering the Port of Rotterdam

Class overview
- Builders: Samsung Heavy Industries
- Operators: Evergreen Marine
- In service: 2005–present
- Planned: 8
- Completed: 8
- Active: 8

General characteristics
- Type: Container ship
- Tonnage: 90,449 GT
- Length: 333.99 m (1,096 ft)
- Beam: 42.8 m (140 ft)
- Draught: 15 m (49 ft)
- Capacity: 8,084 TEU

The LT Cortesia class is a series of 8 container ships built for Conti Reederei and operated by Evergreen Marine. The ships were built by Samsung Heavy Industries in South Korea. The ships have a maximum theoretical capacity of around 8,084 twenty-foot equivalent units (TEU).

== List of ships ==
Ship name	Previous names	Yard number	IMO number	Delivered	Status	Ref.
Conti Cortesia	LT Cortesia (2005-2018)	1512	9293753	25 April 2005	In service	
Phoebe	Ever Champion (2005-2016); Conti Champion (2016-2020)	1513	9293765	30 May 2005	In service	
Seamax New Haven	Ever Charming (2005-2017)	1514	9293777	9 September 2005	In service	
Conti Courage	Hatsu Courage (2005-2017)	1525	9293789	21 December 2005	In service	
Conti Chivalry	Ever Chivalry (2006-2018)	1526	9293791	26 January 2006	In service	
Conti Contessa	Ital Contessa (2006-2019)	1527	9293806	9 March 2006	In service	
Conti Conquest	Ever Conquest (2006-2019)	1528	9293818	7 April 2006	In service	
Conti Crystal	Hatsu Crystal (2006-2018)	1529	9293820	12 May 2006	In service	
