= Österreichischer Lloyd =

Former shipping company

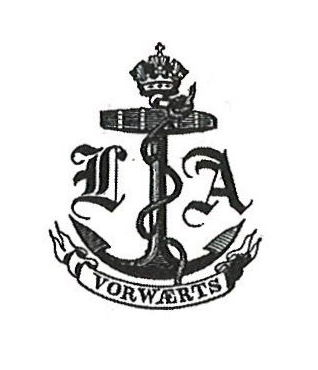
- Type: Joint-stock company
- Industry: Shipping
- Founded: 1833; 191 years ago
- Defunct: 1921; 103 years ago
- Successor: Lloyd Triestino
- Headquarters: Trieste, Austria-Hungary
- Products: Shipping, transport

Österreichischer Lloyd (Italian: Lloyd Austriaco, English: Austrian Lloyd) was the largest Austro-Hungarian shipping company. It was founded in 1833. It was based at Trieste in the Austrian Littoral, the main port of the Cisleithanian (Austrian) half of the Dual Monarchy.

As a result of the First World War the company was transferred into Italian hands. Operations continued from Trieste under the name Lloyd Triestino; it in turn became Italia Marittima in 2006, and is now part of the Evergreen Group.

== History ==
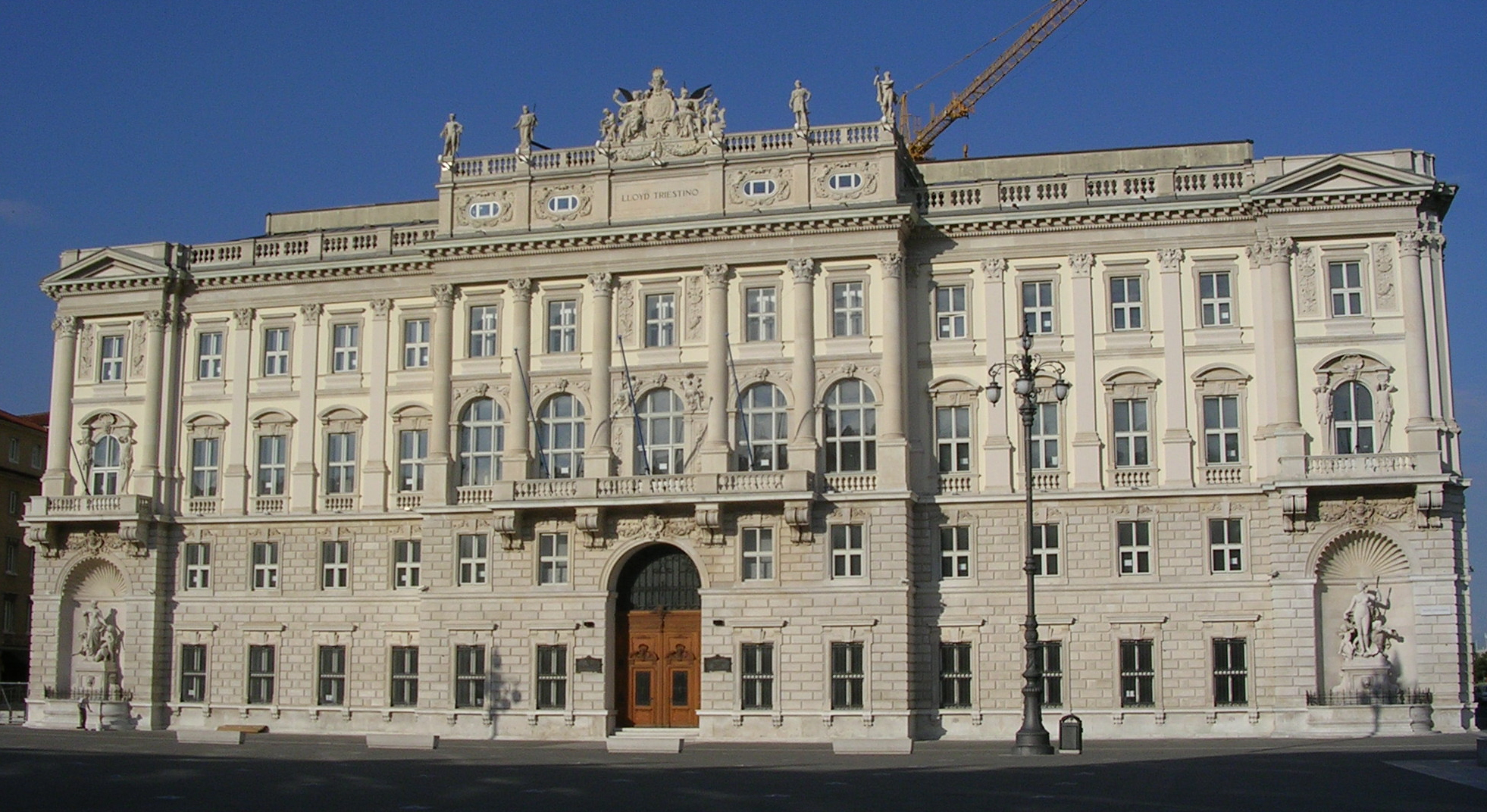
The company's headquarters in Trieste

In 1833, 19 sea transport insurance companies, banking houses and numerous individual shareholders, among them the Austrian politician Karl Ludwig von Bruck, decided to form the Austrian Lloyd Trieste. Originally the company answered the purpose to exchange information on European maritime trade and oversea markets, modelled on Lloyd's Register in London. Relying on a network of business correspondents and newspapers circulating in the Port of Trieste, it issued shipping news and also undertook to provide postal services with sailing vessels supplied by the Austrian Navy.

Within a short period of its formation, the administration applied to Emperor Ferdinand I of Austria for the privilege of steam navigation with the Levant. On 20 April 1836 the steam-navigation department was introduced, and during its second meeting on 2 August the same year the department decided to build six steamships. For this reason, 1836 is considered the year the company was founded.

In 1844 the company grew again when it acquired First Danubian Steam Navigation Company's line via Constantinople to Smyrna along with all its equipment. A year later, Austrian Lloyd was declared the property of the postal service of the Austrian monarchy.

At the opening of the Suez Canal in 1869, Austrian Lloyd was present with its steamships Pluto, Vulcan, and America. Soon after the opening of the Suez Canal, the company launched its Trieste–Bombay line and established a weekly service between Trieste and Port Said. With the opening of the Bombay line, the company acquired an international dimension which was further reinforced by the extension of the line to Colombo in autumn 1879 and early in 1880 to Singapore and Hong Kong. The line to Alexandria, which was modernized in 1894 by the introduction of four new express steamers, and the line to Bombay proved to be the most profitable passenger lines in the company's history. Most of the staff of Austrian Lloyd were Croats, 80% of the staff, out of which 33,5% from Bay of Kotor / Bocche di Cattaro.

The company started conducting pleasure cruises in 1906 with SS Bohemia followed in 1907 by SS Thalia which was built by William Denny and Brothers in 1886 and converted for cruising.

The speed of shipping with the Levant increased and the passages to Calcutta were increased from nine to twelve. As a result, the company transferred the headquarters of the administration from Trieste to Vienna where, on 25 May 1907, the first general assembly of Vienna took place. The last expansion in the company's lines took place in 1912 with the Trieste–Shanghai express line.

The company's successor from 1919 was Lloyd Triestino.

Lloyd ships and buildings

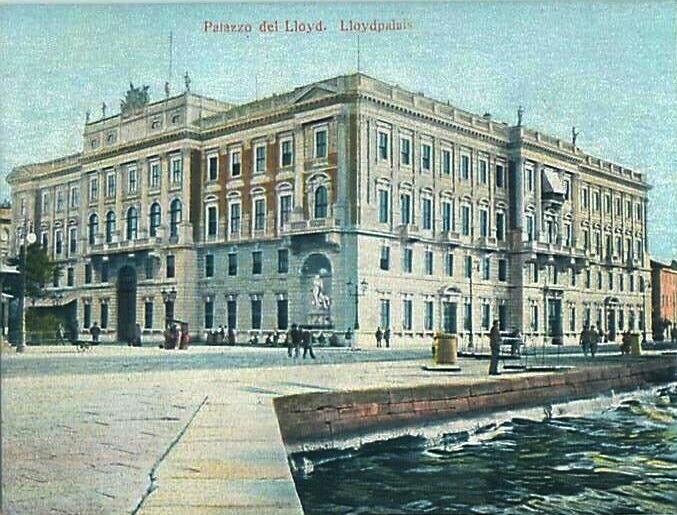
The Austrian Lloyd Trieste Palazzo in the early 1900s

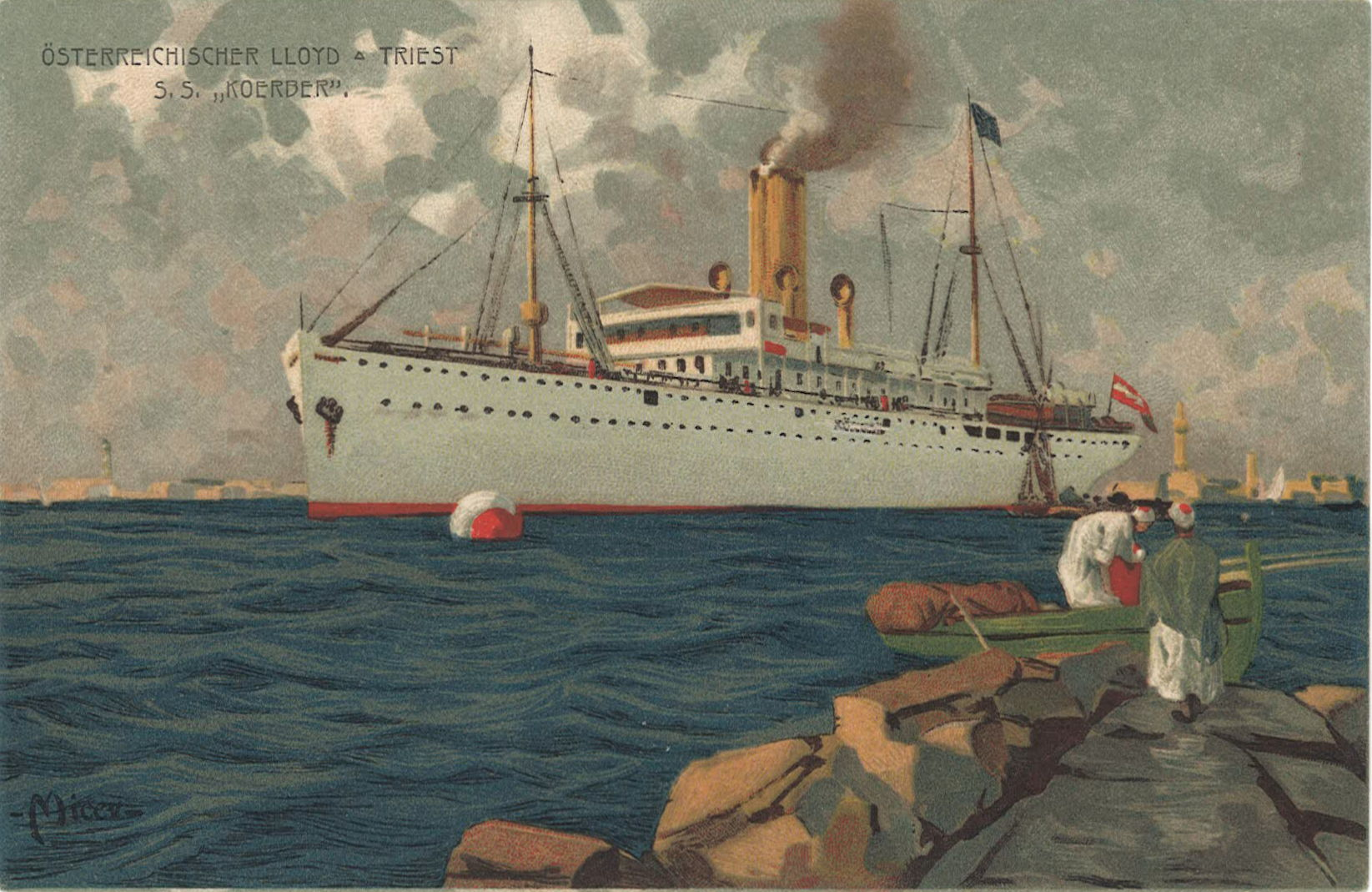
Oil painting of Lloyd's SS Koerber by Miceu, before 1909

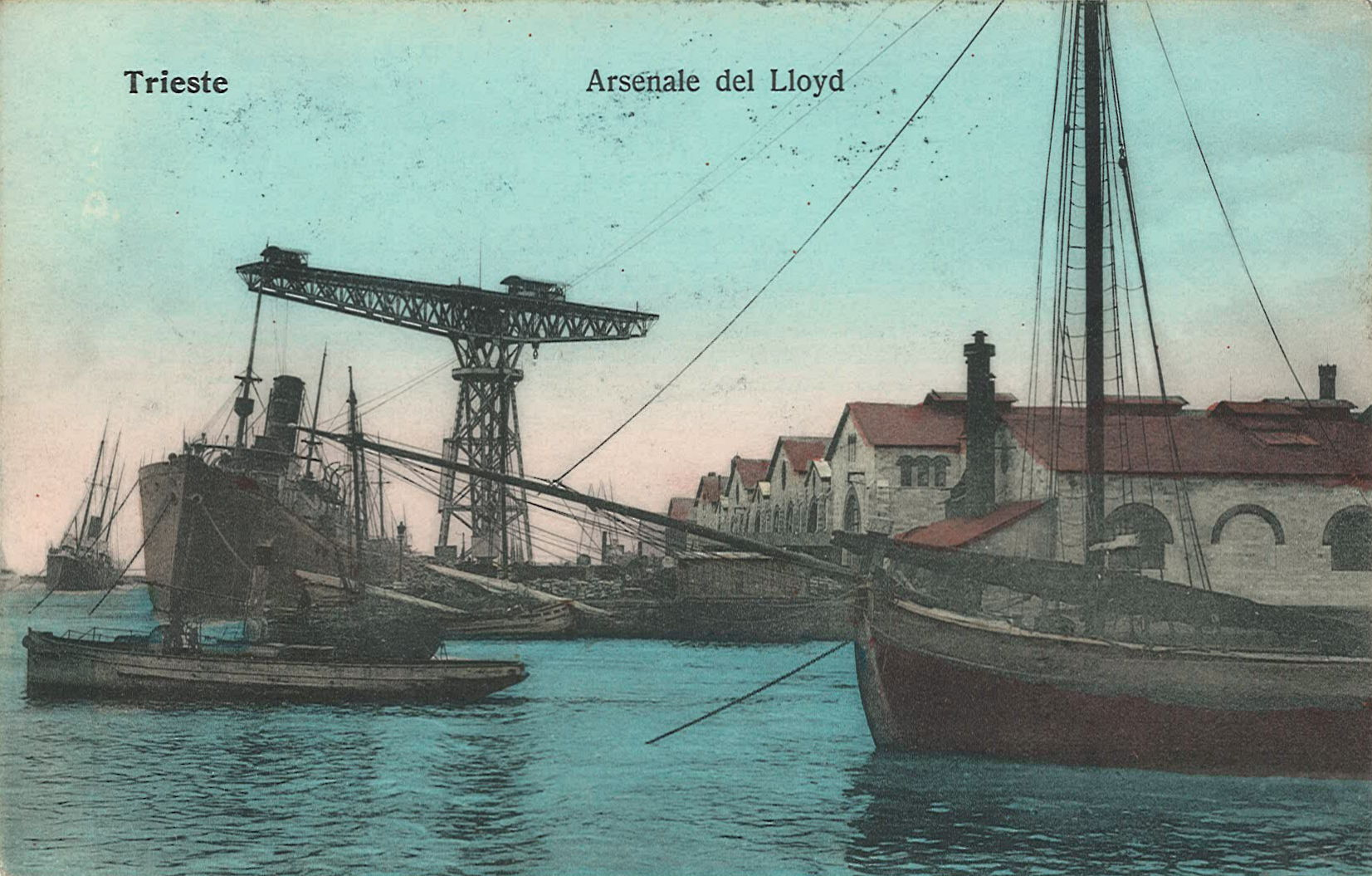
The Lloyd arsenal at Trieste, with shipyard crane, before 1914

SS Semiramis about 1903
Lloyd marketing

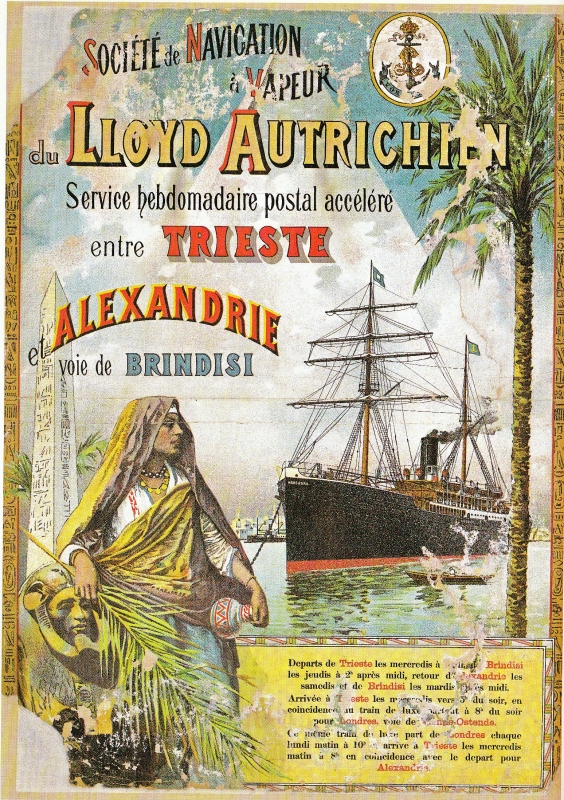
French-language poster advertising the Trieste-Alexandria run

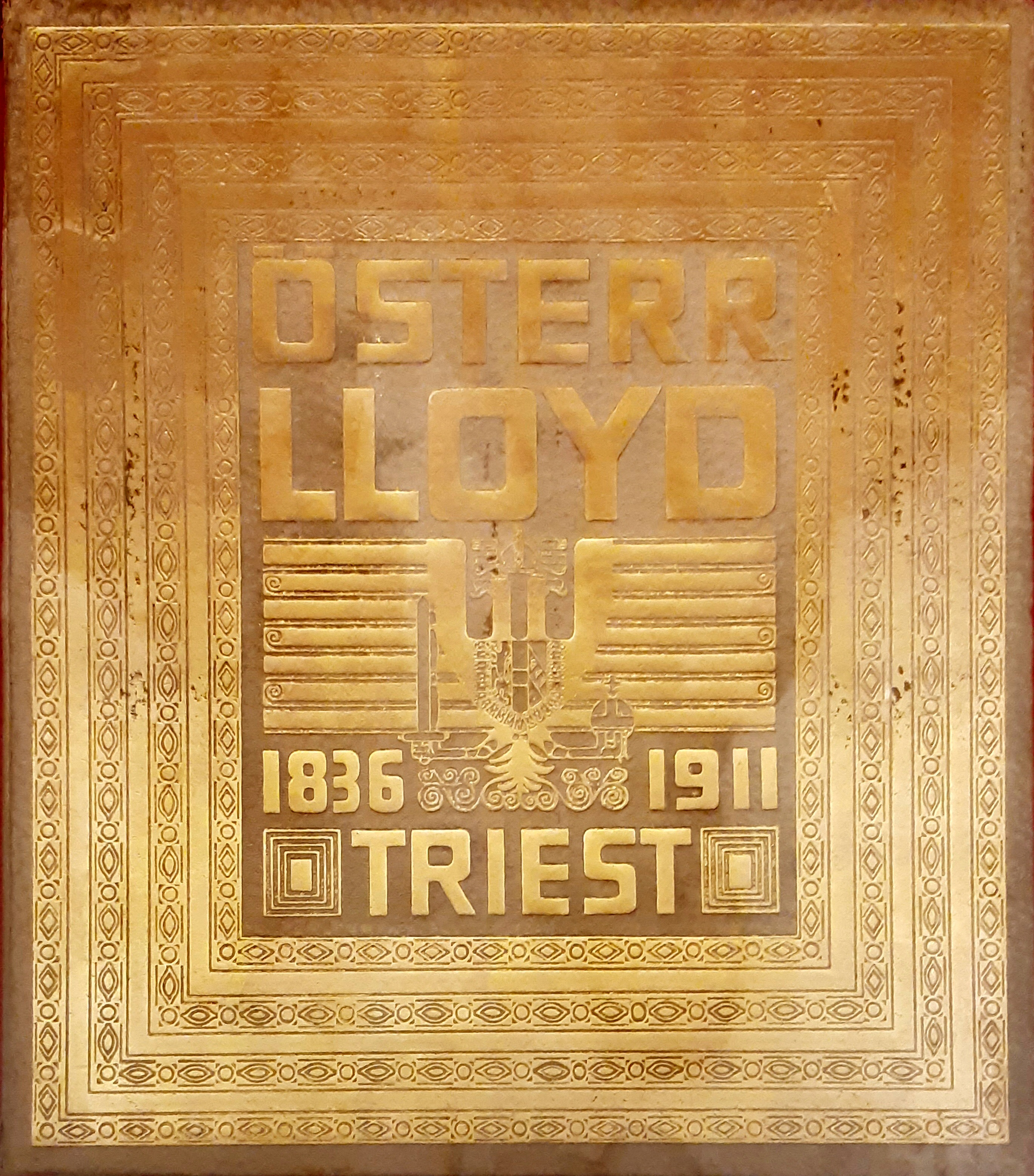
Celebratory Volume for 75th anniversary of Österreichischer Lloyd 1836-1911 Triest

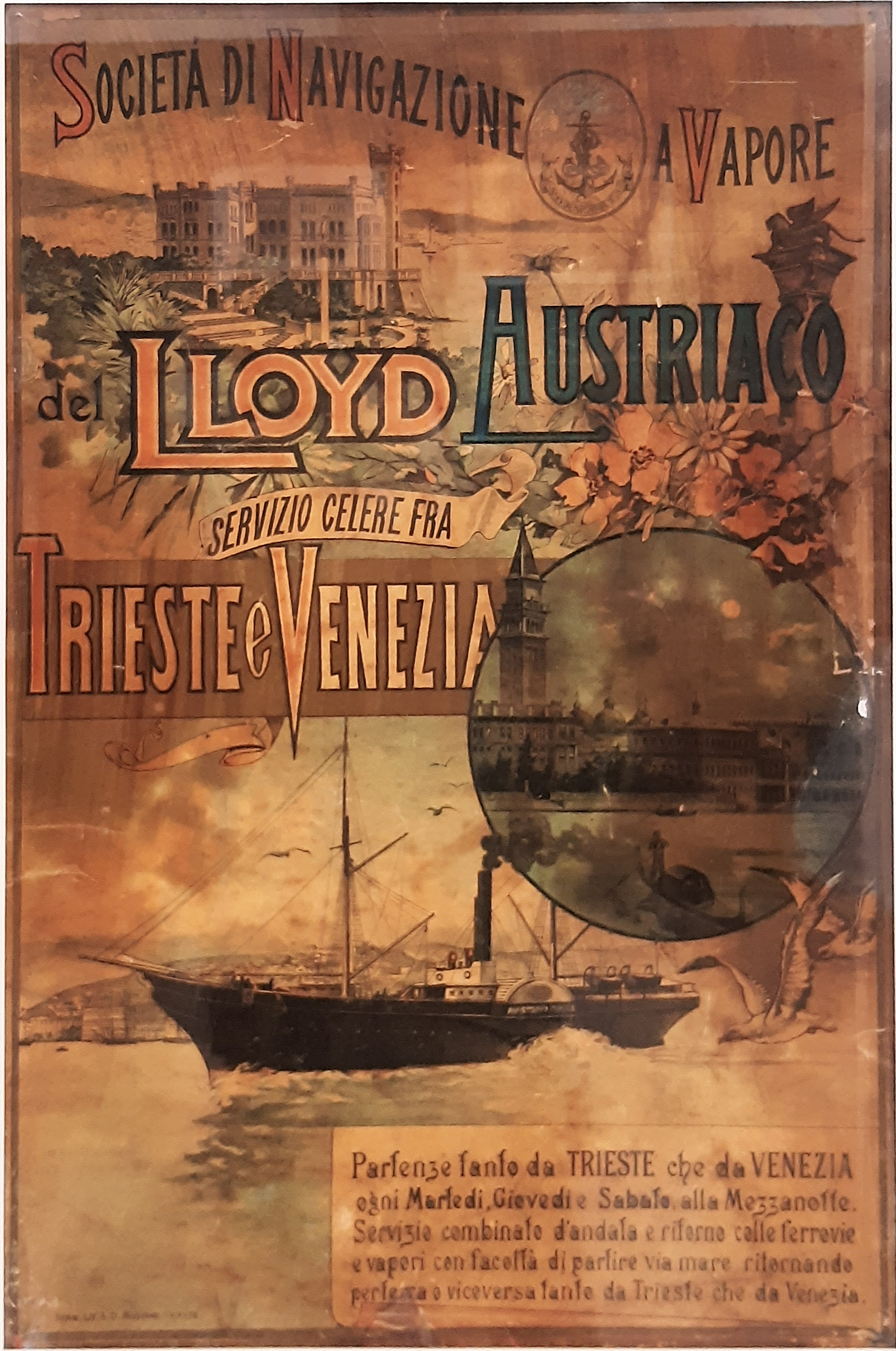
Italian-language poster advertising the Trieste-Venice run

== Bibliography ==
- Bruno Astori, Giuseppe Stefani: Il Lloyd Triestino. Contributo alla storia Italiana della navigazione marittima. Verona MCMXXXVIII – ANNO XVI [1938], Officine grafiche A. Mondadori.
- Autorenkollektiv: Der Lloyd in Triest gestern – heute – morgen. Vom Österreichischen Lloyd zu Lloyd Triestino. Lloyd Triestino di Navigazione, Trieste 1987.
- Ronald E. Coons: Steamships, statesmen and bureaucrats. Austrian policy towards the Steam Navigation Company of the Austrian Lloyd; 1836–1848. Franz Steiner Verlag, Wiesbaden 1975, ISBN 978-3-515-01983-5.
- Matteo Barbano: "Steamers for the Empire: Austrian Lloyd and the Transition from Sail to Steam in the Austrian Merchant Marine (1836–1914)", in Apostolos Delis; Jordi Ibarz; Anna Sydorenko; Matteo Barbano (eds.), Mediterranean Seafarers in Transition: Maritime Labour, Communities, Shipping and the Challenge of Industrialization 1850s — 1920s. Brill, Leiden 2022, 447–477, ISBN 978-90-04-51419-5
- Alison Frank, "The Children of the Desert and the Laws of the Sea: Austria, Great Britain, the Ottoman Empire, and the Mediterranean Slave Trade in the Nineteenth Century," The American Historical Review 117 no. 2 (April 2012), 410-444. doi:10.1086/ahr.117.2.410
- Robert Gabriel: The Indian and Far Eastern lines of the Austrian Lloyd. in: Maritime History, Newton Abbot, David & Charles 1974, No. 2, p. 110–125 (Vol. 4)
- Gregor Gatscher-Riedl: Alt-Österreich auf hoher See. Das Flottenalbum des Österreichischen Lloyd. Bilder und Verkehrsgeschichte aus Österreichs maritimer Vergangenheit. Kral-Verlag, Berndorf 2017, ISBN 978-3-99024-682-5.
- Giovanni Gerolami: Navi e Servizi del Lloyd Triestino (1836–1949). Trieste. Stabilimento Tipografico Nazionale 1949 (2. Auflage: 1956)
- Miroslav Hubert: Do světa s parníky Rakouského Lloydu. Mare-Czech, Prague 2010 (Hinaus in die Welt mit Dampfern des Österreichischen Lloyd)
- Horst Friedrich Mayer, Dieter Winkler: In allen Häfen war Österreich – Die Österreichisch-Ungarische Handelsmarine. Edition S, Verlag der Österreichischen Staatsdruckerei, Vienna 1987, ISBN 978-3-7046-0079-0.
- Georg Pawlik, Dieter Winkler: Der Österreichische Lloyd 1836 bis heute. Weishaupt Verlag, Vienna 1989, ISBN 978-3-900310-55-4.
- Publizistisches Bureau des Österreichischen Lloyd (Hrsg.): Fünfundsiebzig Jahre österreichischer Lloyd 1836–1911. Österreichischer Lloyd, Triest 1911.
- Oskar Stark: Eine versunkene Welt – die Geschichte des österreichischen Lloyd; Fahrten und Ende seiner 62 Schiffe. Rohrer Verlag, Vienna 1959
- Paolo Valenti: Dal Lloyd Austriaco a Italia Marittima. Navi e servizi dal 1836 ad oggi. Luglio Editore, San Dorligo della Valle - Trieste 2016
