= Fish slice =

Cooking or serving utensil

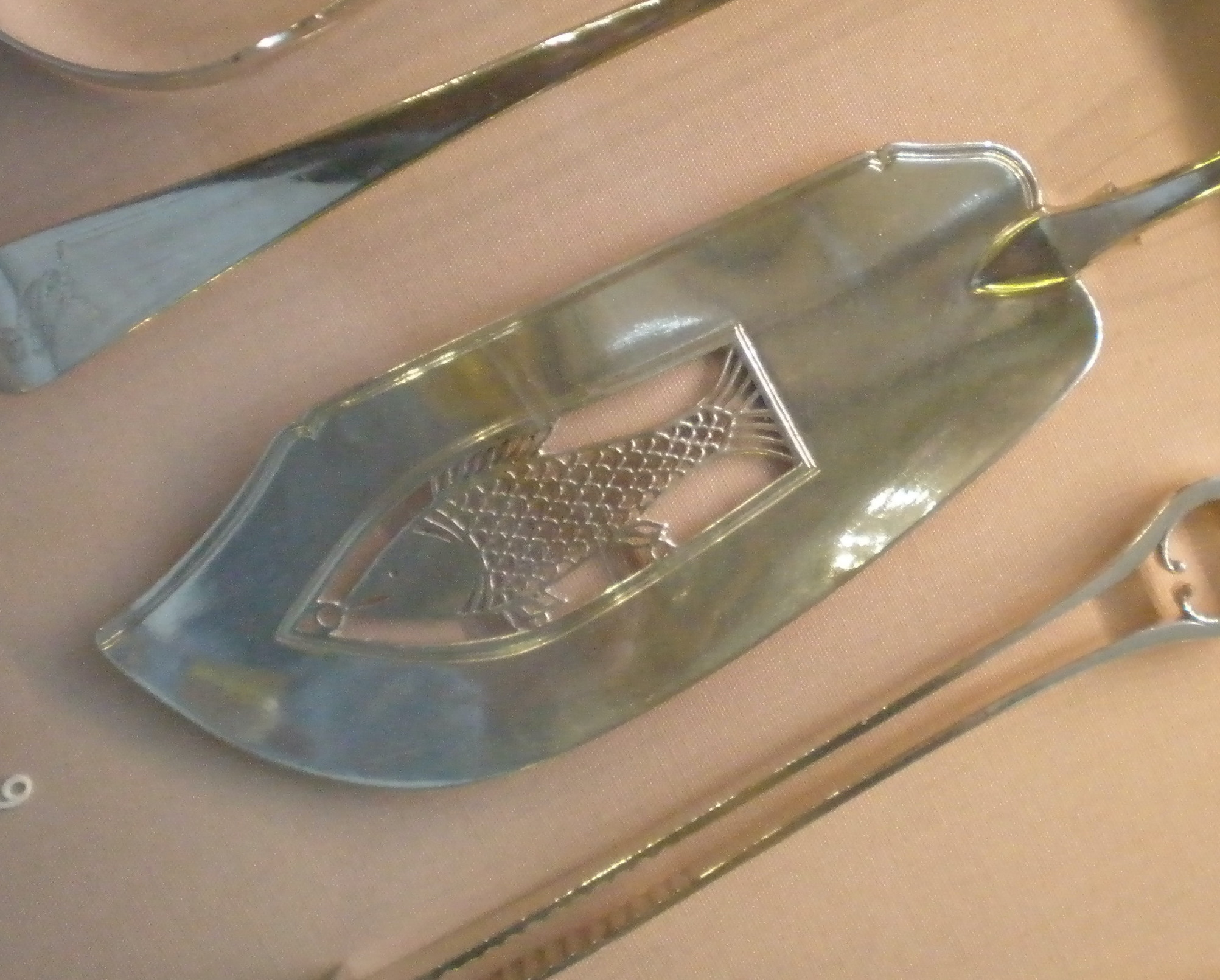
Silver fish slice, 1814–15 by W & S Knight, Victoria and Albert Museum

A fish slice is a kitchen utensil with a wide, flat blade with holes in it, used for lifting and turning food while cooking. It may be called a slotted spatula or a turner or flipper. The utensil was originally designed as a serving piece rather than a cooking implement.

== History ==
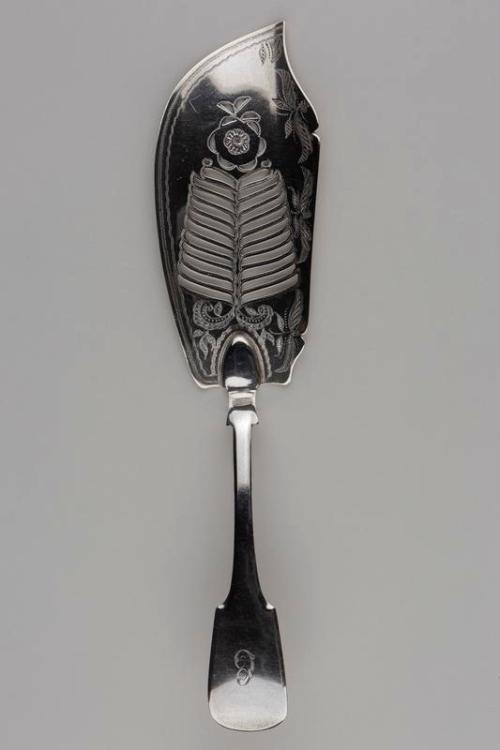
Fish slice c. early 1800s

The fish slice was originally an item of silver service used for serving fish at a dining table and was generally made of silver or Sheffield plate rather than copper or tinned iron to avoid the possibility of affecting the taste of the fish.

The first known slices intended specifically for serving fish were mentioned in 1730. Starting with the 1740s they were often shaped as or decorated with representations of fish. By the 1770s, large numbers were manufactured. By the early 1800s, most flatware services included a fish slice. Antique examples commonly appear at auctions and are held in the collections of multiple museums.

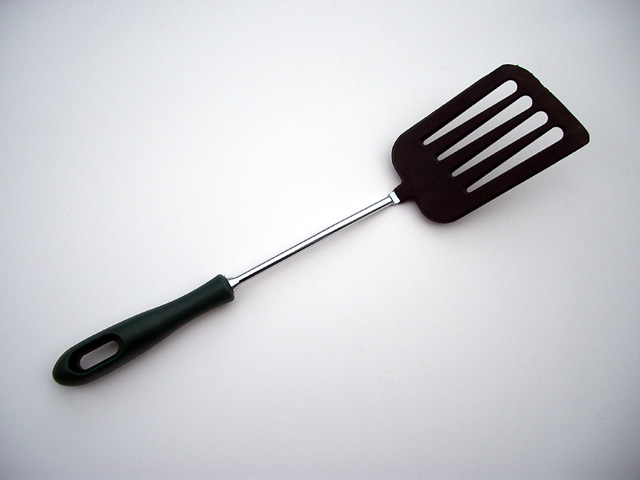
A modern fish slice

The term evolved to refer to any slotted or pierced implement used for turning foods when frying them; modern versions are available in many materials such as stainless steel, nylon, and silicone and are typically undecorated and shaped as spatulas.

== In collections ==
The Victoria and Albert Museum has an extensive collection of metalwork fish slices from Britain and the US and includes both contemporary and historical pieces. Manufacturers include functional items, for example some from Josiah Wedgwood to more sculptural contemporary works by Ane Christensen.

== Similar utensils ==
Other examples of serving slices include those for serving cakes, pies, and other desserts; the pudding trowel or pudding trowle is a predecessor of the fish slice.

== See also ==
- Fish knife
- Fish fork
