= Fish knife =

Table knife used for eating fish

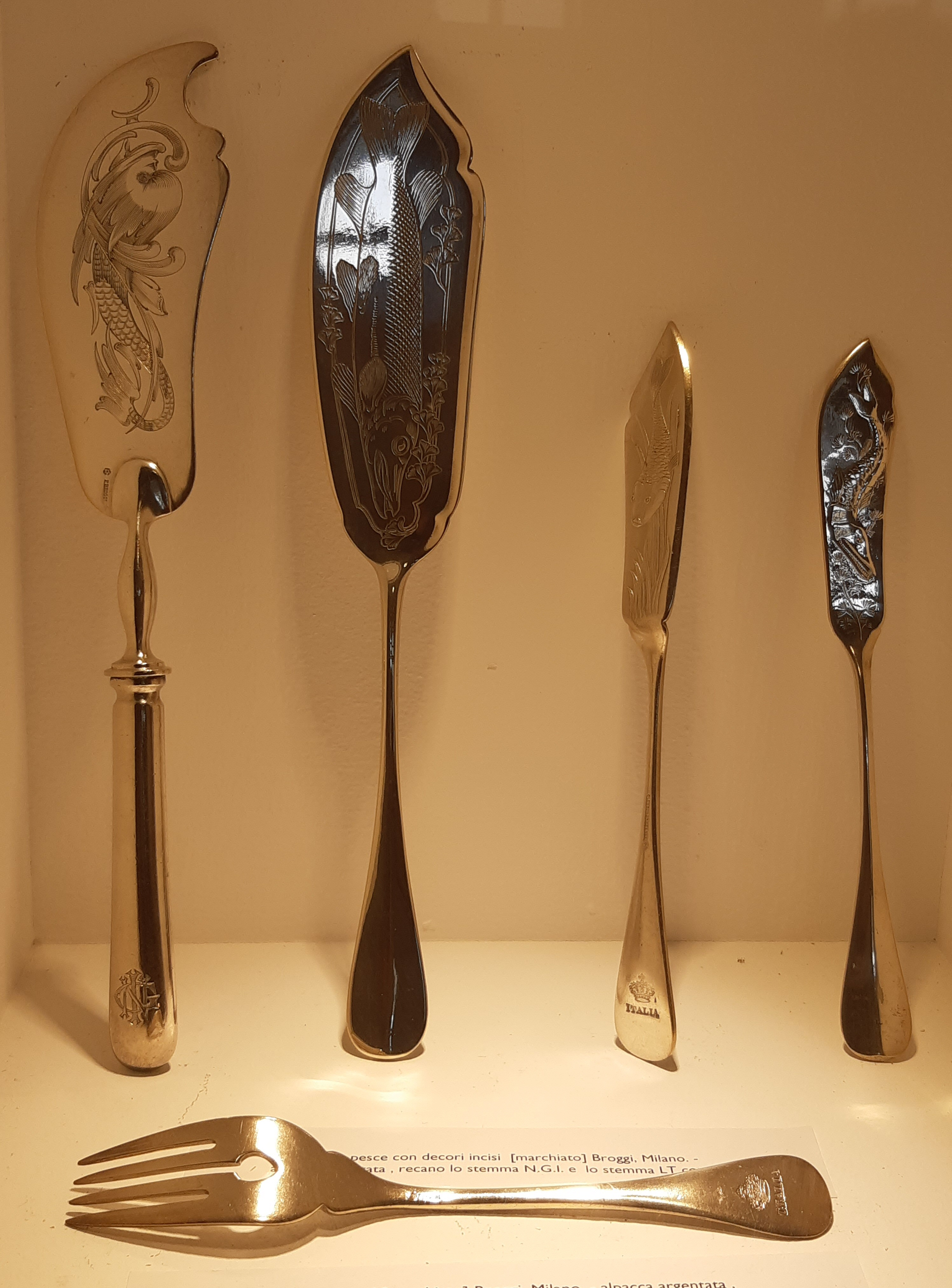
Four kinds of fish knife (two left ones are for serving) and a fish fork for Lloyd Triestino first class dining (1931)

The fish knife together with fish fork represent a set of utensils specialized for eating fish. A fish knife is a strange-looking, purposely blunt implement.

== History ==
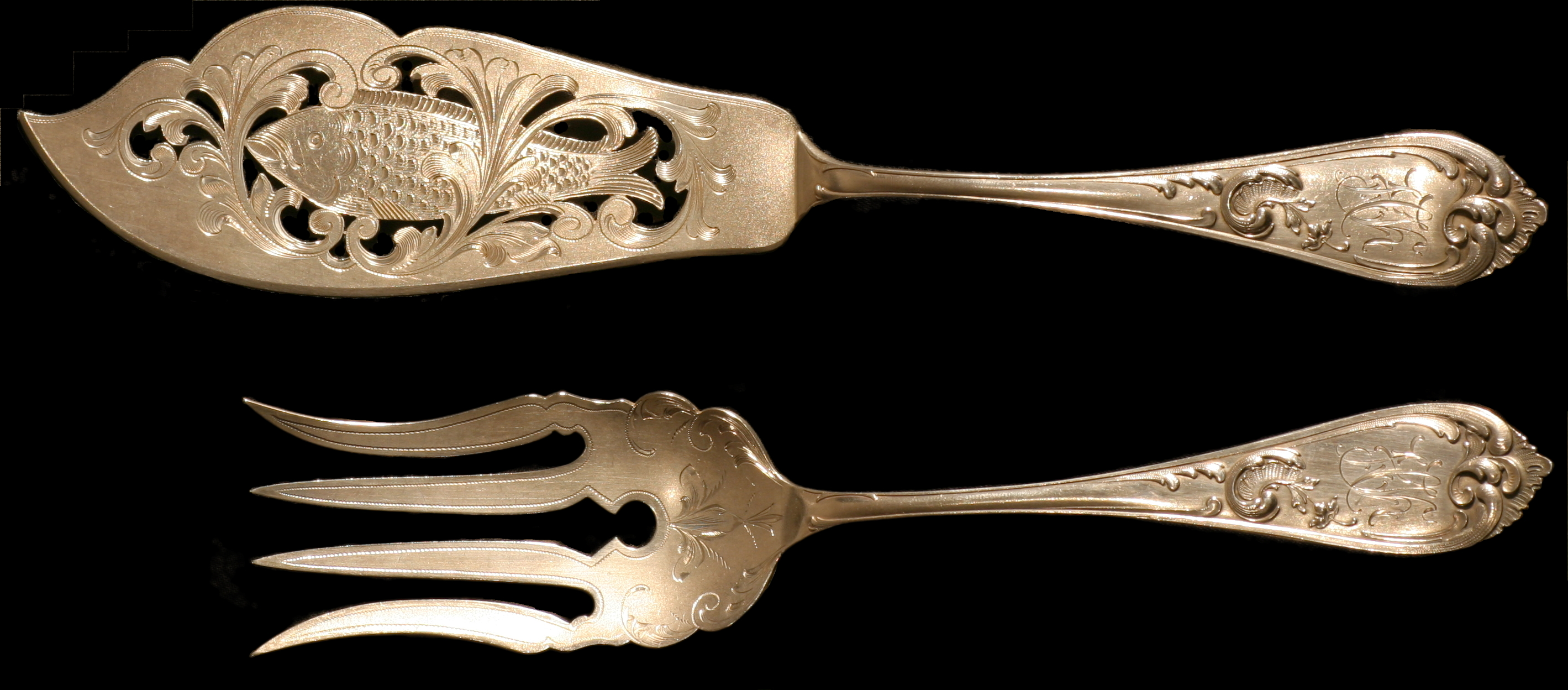
Fish serving cutlery (end of 19th century)

Fish knives, like most highly specialized utensils, date back to the Victorian era. The fish knife was preceded in the 18th century by a silver fish slice (also known as fish trowel, fish carver, and fish knife), a broad tool used for serving fish (thus yet another name, fish server), pudding, and other soft desserts. At the turn of the 19th century, the originally symmetric and broad blade of the fish slice evolved into a scimitar-like shape, with the knife often marketed as a matched set with a four-tined serving fork.

Prior to the modern fish knife introduction in the 19th century, aristocracy ate fish with two dinner forks, one to separate a piece, another one to eat. The other approach used a single fork, with a slice of bread for assistance. Use of the knife came from the rich commoners, with high society at first frowning upon it as a too specialized tool (and the one they were also missing in their hereditary silverware sets). In the 21st century, Queen Camilla, according to The Times of London, "wouldn't be seen dead using a fish knife," and, according to an etiquette expert William Hanson, the vast Buckingham Palace cutlery collection does not have a single fish knife, partly because it's "seen as down-market," and partly because "Buckingham Palace's cutlery goes back to Georgian times and fish knives had not been invented then so they don't have them by default."

Use of silver as a material for the knife was the only available means (before the arrival of the stainless steel) to enable pairing of lemon and fish without encountering a metallic taste.

== Construction ==
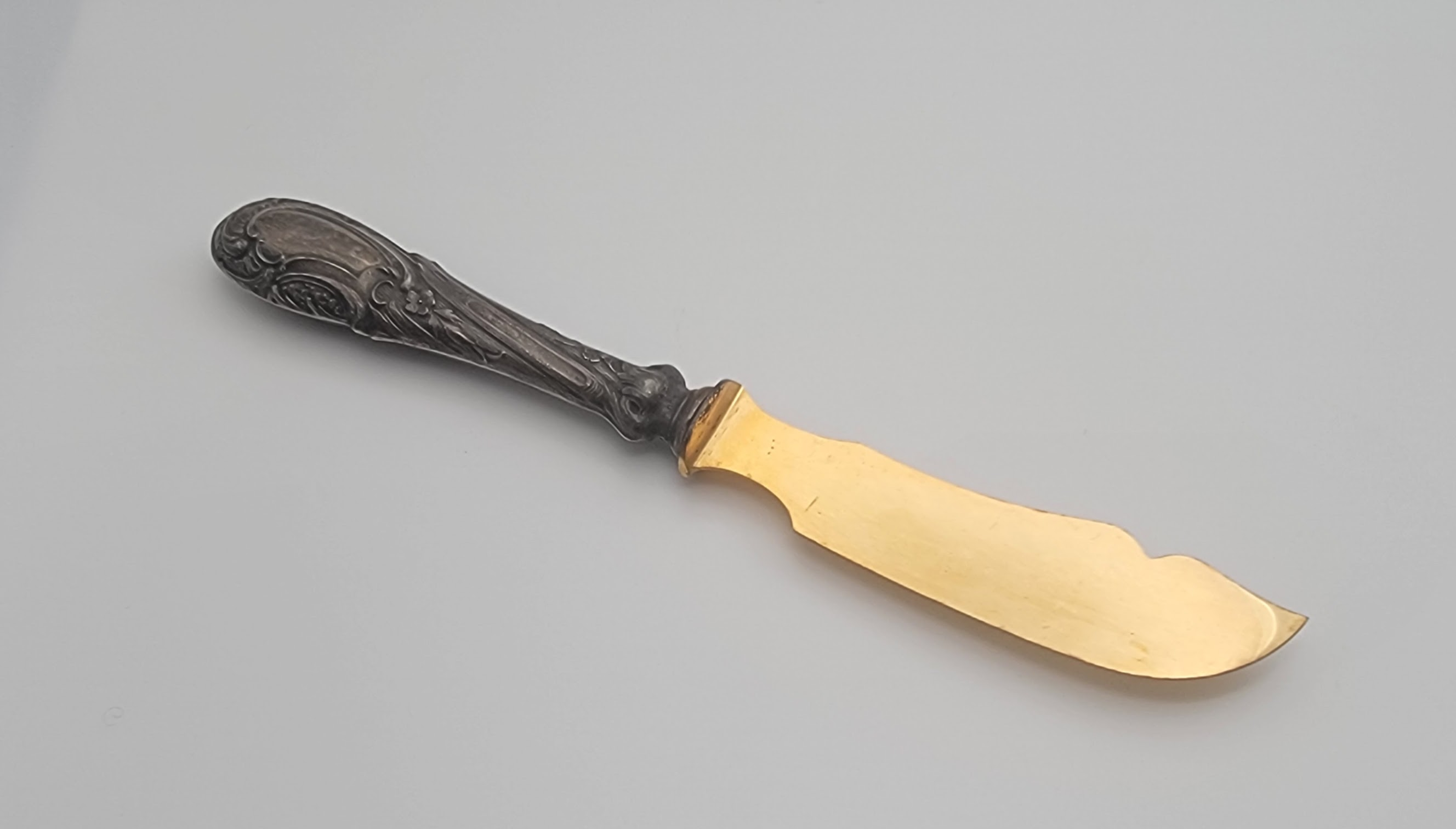
Gold-plated fish knife with the distinctive notch at the top

The knife has a distinct shape that evolved from a fish server. The modern knives are about 8 to 9 inches (20.3-22.8 cm) long, have a dull blade and frequently a notch close to the sharp tip that can be used to separate the bones from the flesh of the fish.

== Use ==
The fish knife is not designed for cutting. Since for fish no force is required to separate the flesh from the bones, the knife is supposed to be held between the thumb and two first fingers (like a pencil) and used to fillet the fish, lift the skeleton, and remove the small remaining bones. If the fish is served already without bones, the knife is either used to "flake" the pieces onto the fork, or its use can be avoided altogether, known as "American style".

== Symbol ==
Fish knives and forks were originally very expensive silverware items, so having them, or, in the case of aristocracy, consciously avoiding their use, became a class marker, a status symbol used to indicate the user or owner's elite status. After the invention of electroplating, knife and fork sets became more affordable by the 1860s, but the possession of them still indicated belonging to the "comfortable" middle class. By the middle of the 20th century, the fish knife and fork sets became a symbol for upper-class aspirations of a household. John Betjeman starts his poem "How to get on in society" (1958) with a pursuit of fish knives as a symbol of pretensions (Phone for the fish knives ... I must have things daintily served). Anne Glenconner recalls that Queen Camilla, upon being offered a fish knife in a restaurant, recited the Betjeman poem and rejected the fish knife.

In the 21st century use of the fish knives at a restaurant is also seen by some as a symbol of high aspirations (perhaps, for a Michelin star).

== Sources ==
- A Member of the Aristocracy (1898). Manners and Rules of Good Society: Or, Solecisms to be Avoided. F. Warne.
- Cool, H.E.M. (2009). "Fish knives, silver spoons and red dishes" (PDF). Food and Drink in Archaeology 2. University of Nottingham Postgraduate Conference 2008. Totnes: Prospect Books. ISBN 978-1-903018-68-2.
- Hudson, A. (2023). The Soul of Civility: Timeless Principles to Heal Society and Ourselves. St. Martin's Publishing Group. ISBN 978-1-250-27779-4.
- Moore, J.H. (1998). The Etiquette Advantage: Rules for the Business Professional. Life@Work Series. Broadman & Holman. ISBN 978-0-8054-0154-7.
- Von Drachenfels, Susanne (2000). The Art of the Table: A Complete Guide to Table Setting, Table Manners, and Tableware. Simon & Schuster. ISBN 978-0-684-84732-0.
- Wees, B.C. (1997). English, Irish, & Scottish Silver at the Sterling and Francine Clark Art Institute. Hudson Hills Press. ISBN 978-1-55595-117-7.
- Worcester, J.E. (1860). A Dictionary of the English Language. Hickling, Swan and Brewer.
