= SS Galileo Galilei =

Ocean liner

Coordinates: 4°37′1″N 99°54′6″E

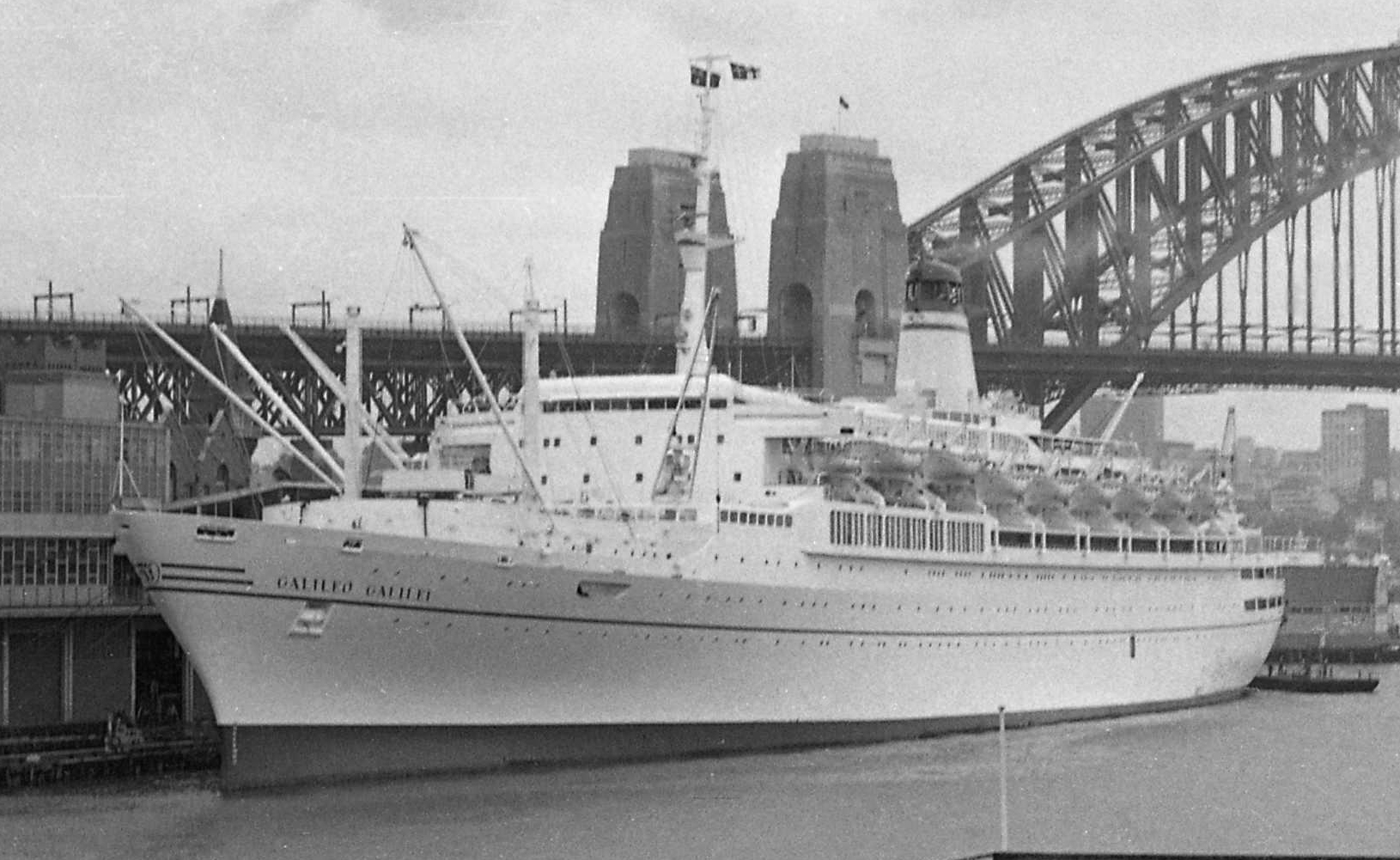
- SS Galileo Galilei in Sydney

History
- Name: 1963–1984: Galileo Galilei; 1984–1990: Galileo; 1990–1997: Meridian; 1997–1999: Sun Vista
- Owner: 1963–1979: Lloyd Triestino; 1979–1983: Italia Crociere; 1983–1990: Chandris Cruises; 1990–1997: Celebrity Cruises; 1997–1999: Sun Cruises
- Operator: 1983–1977: Lloyd Triestino; 1979: Italia Crociere; 1984–1989: Chandris Fantasy Cruises; 1990–1997: Celebrity Cruises; 1997–1999: Sun Cruises
- Port of registry: 1963–1983: Genoa, Italy; 1983–1990: Panama City, Panama; 1990–1999: Nassau, Bahamas
- Ordered: 1960
- Builder: Cantieri Riuniti dell'Adriatico, Monfalcone, Italy
- Yard number: 1982
- Launched: 2 July 1961
- Acquired: March 1963
- Maiden voyage: 23 March 1963
- In service: 23 March 1963
- Out of service: 20 May 1999
- Identification: IMO number: 5411254
- Fate: Caught fire and sank in the Straits of Malacca on 21 May 1999
- Notes: Sister ship to SS Guglielmo Marconi

General characteristics (as built)
- Tonnage: 27,888 GRT; 9,486 DWT
- Length: 213.65 m (700 ft 11 in)
- Beam: 28.71 m (94 ft 2 in)
- Draught: 8.60 m (28 ft 3 in)
- Installed power: Four De Laval-San Andrea steam turbines; 32,824 kW (combined)
- Propulsion: Twin propellers
- Speed: 24 knots (44 km/h; 28 mph) (service)
- Capacity: 1,750 passengers; (156 first class, 1,594 tourist class)

General characteristics (following 1984 refit)
- Capacity: 1,262 passengers
- Notes: Otherwise the same as built

General characteristics (following 1990 refit)
- Tonnage: 30,440 GRT
- Capacity: 1,428 passengers
- Notes: Otherwise the same as built

SS Galileo Galilei was an ocean liner built in 1963 by Cantieri Riuniti dell' Adriatico, Monfalcone, Italy for Lloyd Triestino's Italy–Australia service. In 1979, she was converted to a cruise ship, and subsequently sailed under the names Galileo and Meridian. She sank in the Strait of Malacca in 1999 as the Sun Vista.

== History ==
Ordered by Lloyd Triestino in 1960, Galileo Galilei was built in Italy for the Australian immigrant route. Galileo Galilei was launched on 2 July 1961. On 23 March 1963, the ship entered service for Lloyd Triestino, doing Mediterranean cruises before departing on its official maiden voyage from Genoa, Italy to Sydney, Australia on 22 April 1963. In November of the same year, she was joined on the route by her sister ship SS Guglielmo Marconi. Originally the ships traveled to Australia via the eastern route, passing through Suez Canal in both directions, but in the later years the return trip to Europe was via the Panama Canal. They also routed to Australia via the Cape of Good Hope in the late 1960s and early 1970s.

The ships were very successful until the 1973 oil crisis, which, combined with the increasing prevalence of airliners, contributed to the decline of ocean liners. Galileo Galilei returned to Genoa and repaired after she struck a reef off the coast of West Africa on 13 January 1975. Galileo Galilei continued to operate on the Italy–Australia run until April 1977, at which point she was withdrawn from service and laid up. Her lay-up was short, and in October 1977 she returned to her builders for a lengthy reconstruction into a cruise ship. On 24 March 1979 the Galileo Galilei finally started cruise service with Italia Crociere (owned by Italia Navigazione, who also owned Lloyd Triestino). However, already in September of the same year the Galileo Galilei was withdrawn from service and laid up again.

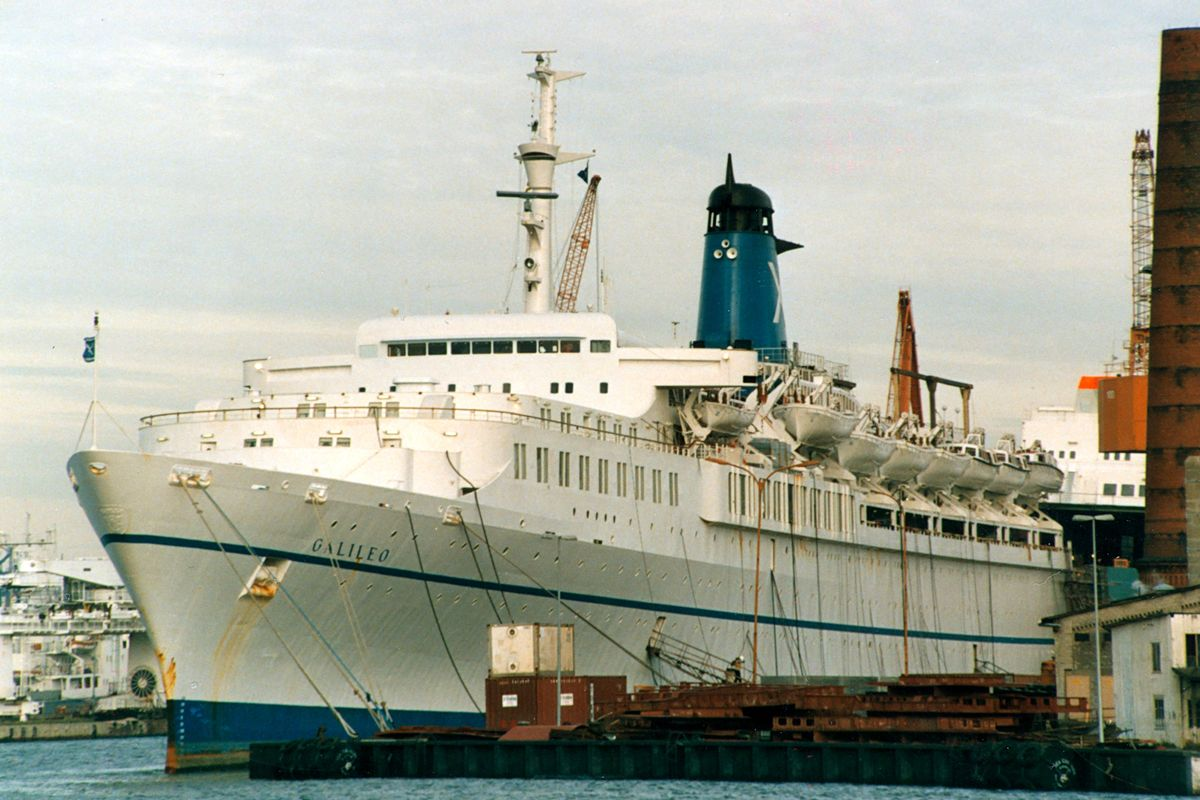
Galileo at Lloyd Werft, Bremerhaven, Germany during her refit into the Meridian

In 1983, the vessel was purchased by Chandris Group. The ship was again rebuilt, this time with additional cabins on her forward deck, and her name shortened to Galileo. In 1984 the Galileo began cruising on the Caribbean under Chandris Fantasy Cruises brand. After the collapse of Home Lines in 1988 Chandris's executives decided to create a new upmarket brand to take over the market segment occupied by Home Lines. With this in mind the Galileo underwent a multimillion-dollar refit at Lloyd Werft, Bremerhaven, Germany between October 1989 and February 1990. Most of her interiors were rebuilt, and externally her rear superstructure enlarged. On 1 March 1990 she re-entered service as the sleek SS Meridian, the first ship of the new Celebrity Cruises brand, cruising on the Caribbean and the Boston/New York–Bermuda service.

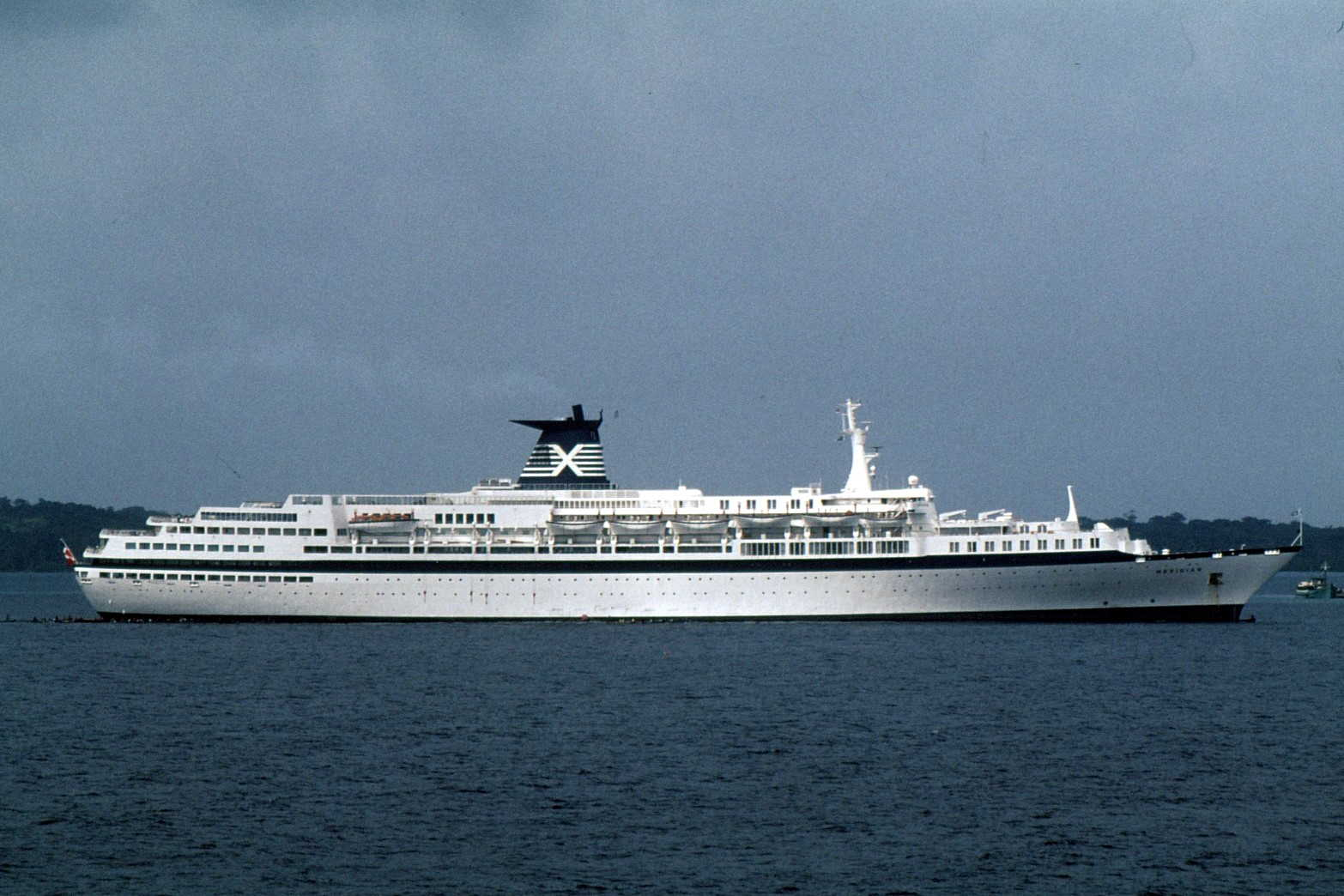
Meridian at the San Blas Islands

In 1997, following Royal Caribbean International's acquisition of Celebrity Cruises, the ship was sold to Sun Cruises, which operated her as SS Sun Vista. On 20 May 1999, the vessel suffered an engine room fire, which cut all power and caused her to sink in the Strait of Malacca on 21 May 1999 at 0121 hrs. All 1,090 passengers and crew were safely evacuated.

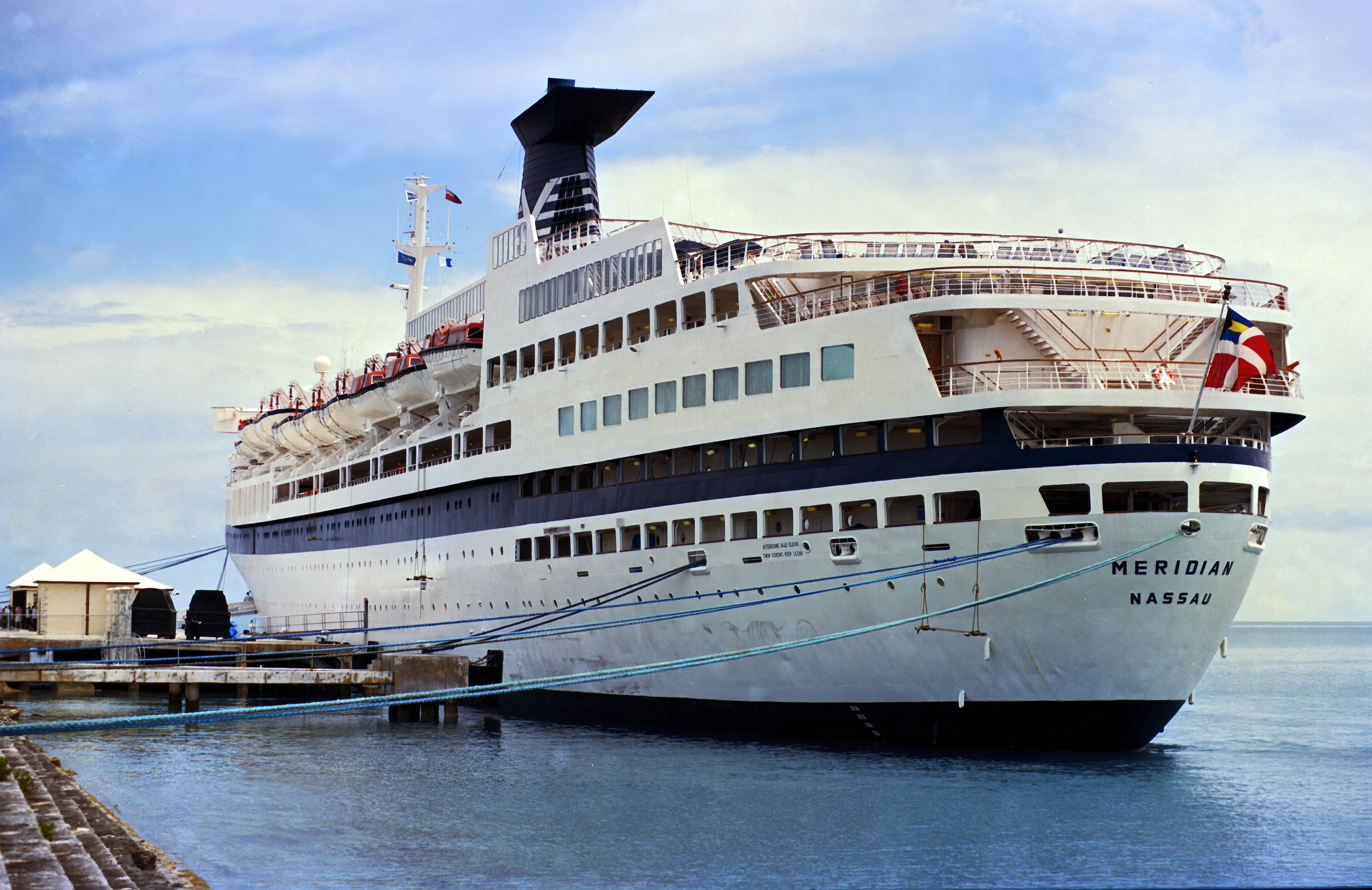
SS Meridian in Bermuda

== Media ==
In 1999, Sun Vista was featured in the Indian Hindi-language romantic drama film Mann.
