= SS Guglielmo Marconi =

Italian ocean liner

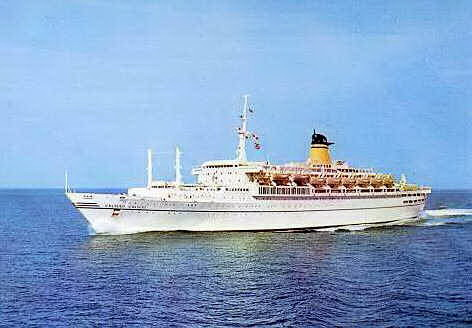
- Gugliemo Marconi seen on a Lloyd Triestino postcard

History
- Name: Guglielmo Marconi (1963–1983); Costa Riviera (1983–1993); American Adventure (1993–1994); Costa Riviera (1994–2001); Liberty (2001–2002)
- Owner: Lloyd Triestino (1961–1976); Italian Line/Italia Crociere Internazionali (1976–1979), (1979–1983); Costa Cruises (1983–1985), (1985–1993); American Family Cruises (1993–1994); Costa Cruises (1994–2001)
- Port of registry: ?–1986: Genoa, Italy; 1986–1995: Naples, Italy; 1995–2000: Monrovia, Liberia; 2000–2002: Genoa, Italy; 2002: Monrovia, Liberia
- Route: Genoa-Naples-Messina-Port Said-Aden-Fremantle-Melbourne-Sydney
- Builder: Cantieri Riuniti dell'Adriatico, Monfalcone, Italy
- Yard number: 1863
- Launched: 24 September 1961
- Completed: October 1963
- Maiden voyage: 18 November 1963
- In service: 1963
- Out of service: 2001
- Identification: Call sign IBBG; IMO number: 5137391
- Fate: Scrapped March 2002

General characteristics
- Type: Ocean liner
- Tonnage: As built, 27,905 GRT. 1983, 28,137 GRT
- Length: 701 ft (213.7m)
- Beam: 94 ft 2 in (28.6m)
- Draught: 28 ft 3 in (8.6m)
- Installed power: 44,000 shp (32,800 kW)
- Propulsion: Geared turbines, twin screw
- Speed: 24 knots
- Capacity: 156 1st class, 994 tourist
- Crew: 443

SS Guglielmo Marconi was an Italian ocean liner launched on 24 September 1961 for Lloyd Triestino's Genoa—Sydney service. Her sister ship was SS Galileo Galilei. Guglielmo Marconi left Genoa on her maiden voyage on November 18th 1963. In 1976, she was transferred to the Naples-Brazil-River Plate service of Italian Line.

In 1979 she was transferred to Italia Crociere as a full-time cruise ship. This was not a success and she was sold to Costa Cruises in 1983. After a two-year rebuild, the ship reappeared as Costa Riviera for Costa Cruises in 1985. Costa Riviera alternated between Caribbean and Alaskan cruising during her time with Costa Cruises.

In 1993, American Family Cruises was launched, a joint venture between Costa and Bruce Nierenburg, to operate cruises aimed at young American families with children. AFC were not successful, and the ship sailed for Genoa in September 1994 where she was converted back to the Costa Riviera, and began cruising her last years in Europe.

Costa Riviera was sold for scrap under the name Liberty in 2001.

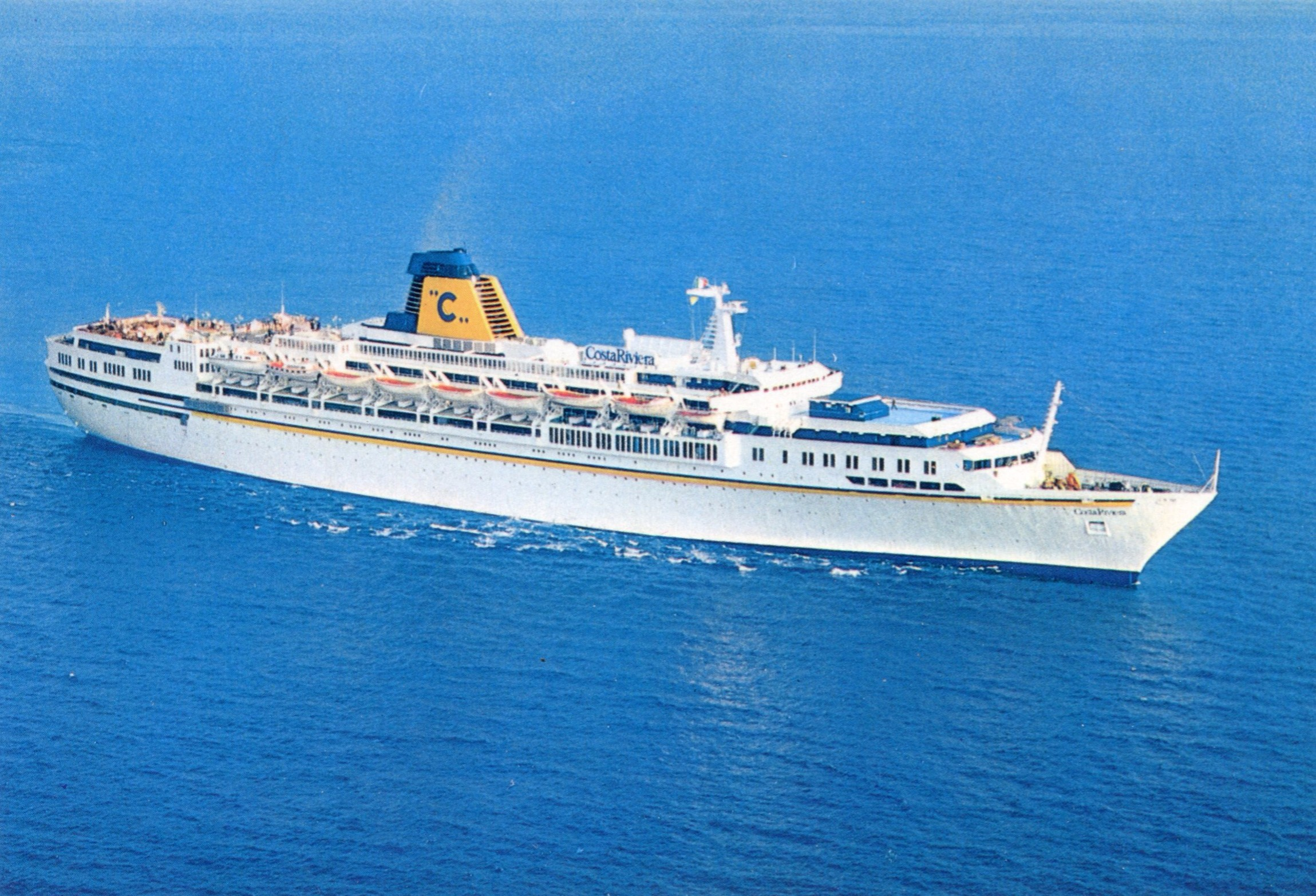
Postcard of Costa Riviera at sea

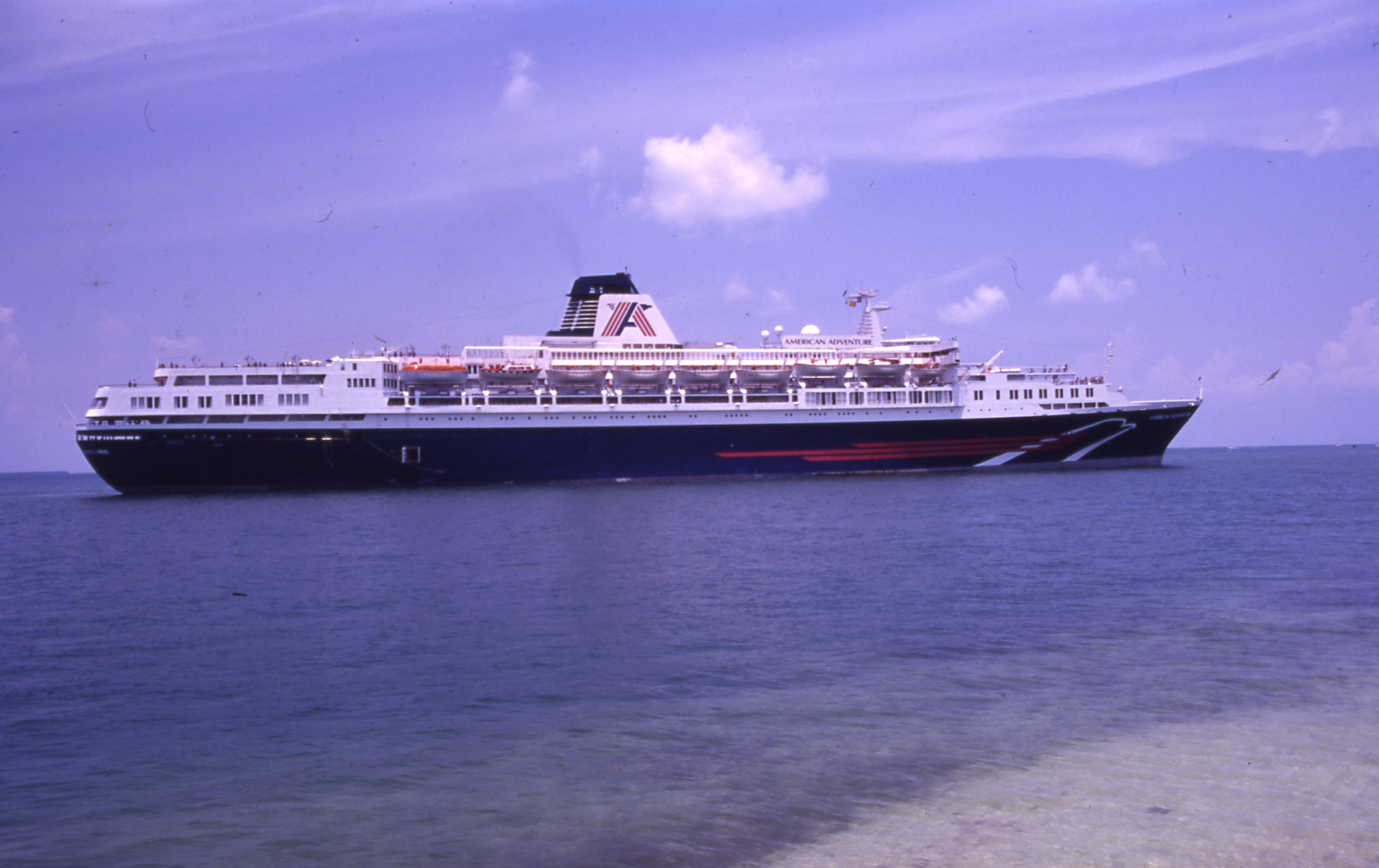
American Adventure in Key West Harbor

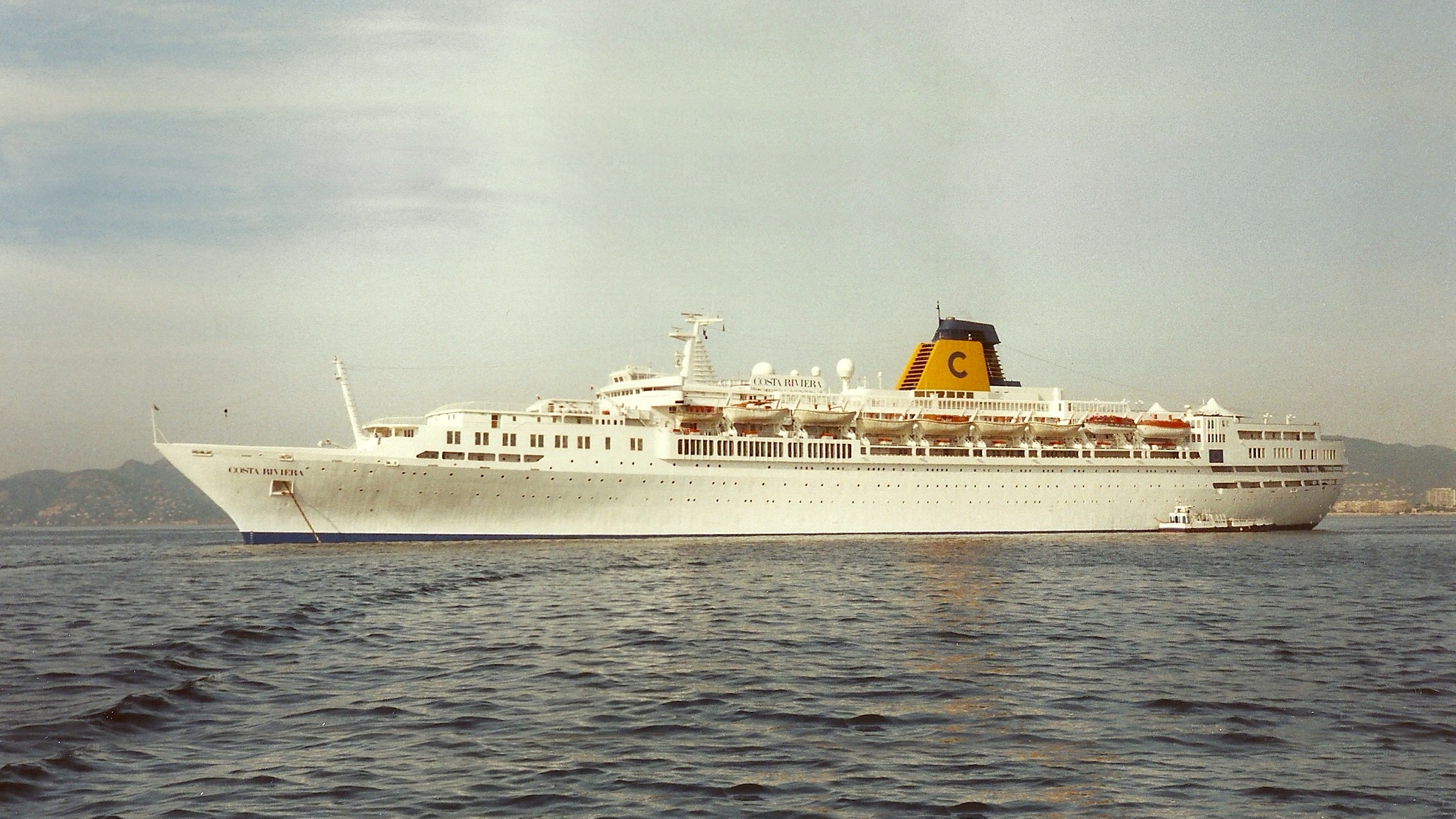
Costa Riviera at sea in 2001
