= Fish fork =

Fish-oriented eating utensil

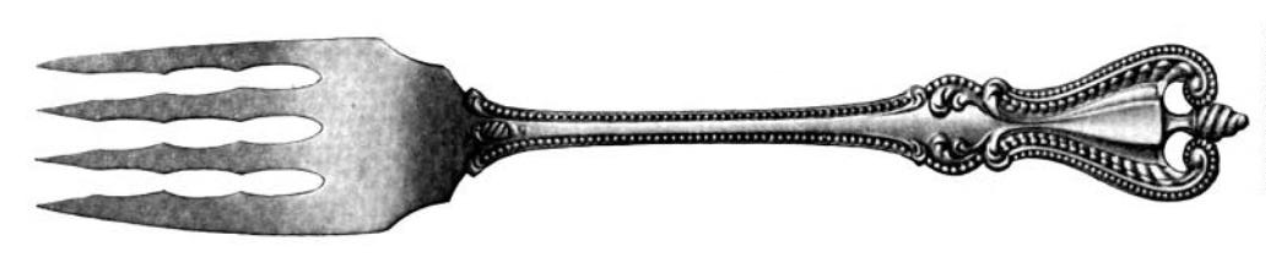
Fish fork (1908)

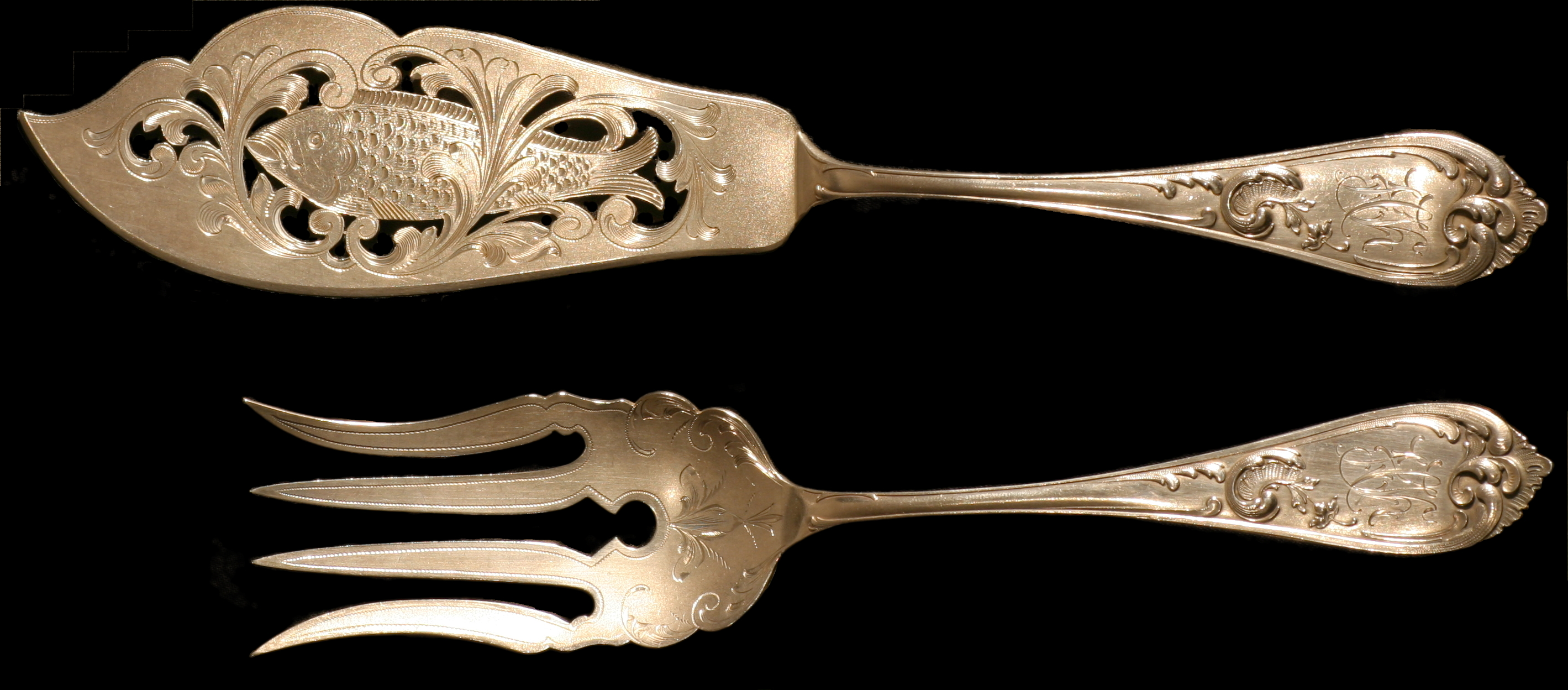
Fish serving knife and fork (end of 19th century)

The fish fork, sometimes along with the fish knife, is an eating utensil specialized for fish meals. Like most highly specialized utensils, the fork dates back to Victorian era (c. 1870). With a length of about 7.5 inches, its distinctive features often include a wide left tine (similar to the pastry fork) or a deep notch that can be fit over the bones. To avoid the metallic taste that comes from metal in the fork reacting with the acid in lemons, which are commonly served with fish, the fork was traditionally, until the arrival of stainless steel in the 1920s, made of silver.

A similar fork with the same name, intended for serving, has three to four tines and is longer at 8 to 10 inches. To distinguish the eating fork from the serving one, the former was sometimes labeled as "individual".

Fish forks are used just as normal forks are and can be replaced by a long (7–8 inches (18–20 cm) in length) or medium-long (6–6.5 inches (15–17 cm)) dining fork.

Prior to the introduction of the modern fish knife in the 19th century, members of the aristocracy ate fish with two dinner forks, one to separate a piece and another one to eat – or otherwise with a single fork and a slice of bread to help.

== Sources ==
- Von Drachenfels, Susanne (2000). The Art of the Table: A Complete Guide to Table Setting, Table Manners, and Tableware. Simon & Schuster. ISBN 978-0-684-84732-0.
- Towle Mfg. Company (1908). The Colonial Book of the Towle Mfg. Company, Silversmiths: Which is Intended to Delineate and Describe Some Quaint and Historic Places in Newburyport and Vicinity and Show the Origin and Beauty of the Colonial Pattern of Silverware. Press of Springfield Printing and Binding Company.
- Rush, C. (2008). The Mere Mortal's Guide to Fine Dining: From Salad Forks to Sommeliers, How to Eat and Drink in Style Without Fear of Faux Pas. Crown. ISBN 978-0-307-48816-9.
- A Member of the Aristocracy (1898). Manners and Rules of Good Society: Or, Solecisms to be Avoided. F. Warne.
