= LT Cortesia =

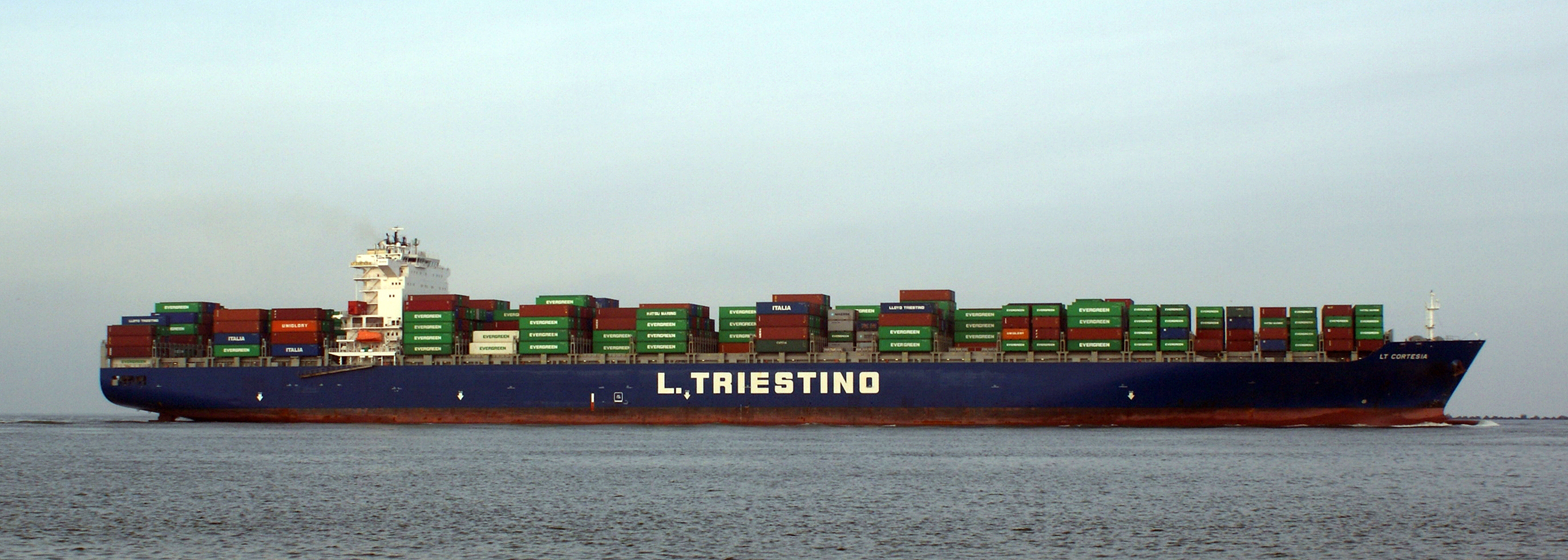

History
- Name: Conti Cortesia
- Owner: Conti Reederei
- Operator: Evergreen Marine
- Port of registry: Germany; Marshall Islands
- Builder: Samsung Heavy Industries
- Launched: 5 February 2005
- Identification: Call sign: DDYY2; IMO number: 9293753; MMSI number: 218059000

General characteristics
- Class & type: LT Cortesia-class container ship
- Tonnage: 90,465 GT 100,863 DWT
- Length: 334 m (1,095 ft 10 in)
- Beam: 43 m (141 ft 1 in)
- Capacity: 8100 TEU

LT Cortesia is a 90,465 GT container ship owned by German-based Conti Reederei, managed by NSB Niederelbe and operated as part of the Evergreen Line fleet.

She is the lead ship of a class of eight Post-Panamax ships with a capacity of 8,100 TEU, built between May 2005 and May 2006 by Samsung Heavy Industries, the vessel was built to replace the 5,600-TEU U-type vessels then deployed.

LT Cortesia, like all ships in the class, are on a long-term charter to the Evergreen Line fleet from Conti-NSB/Germany.

== History ==
On 2 January 2008 at 0500 GMT the container ship LT Cortesia ran aground in the Dover Strait. The ship was en route to the Suez Canal when it ran aground on Varne Bank, nine miles south west of Dover. Later in the day, when the tide rose, she was refloated and towed to The Downs for inspection. After an inspection on 3 January she was declared seaworthy and resumed her journey.
