= List of food preparation utensils =

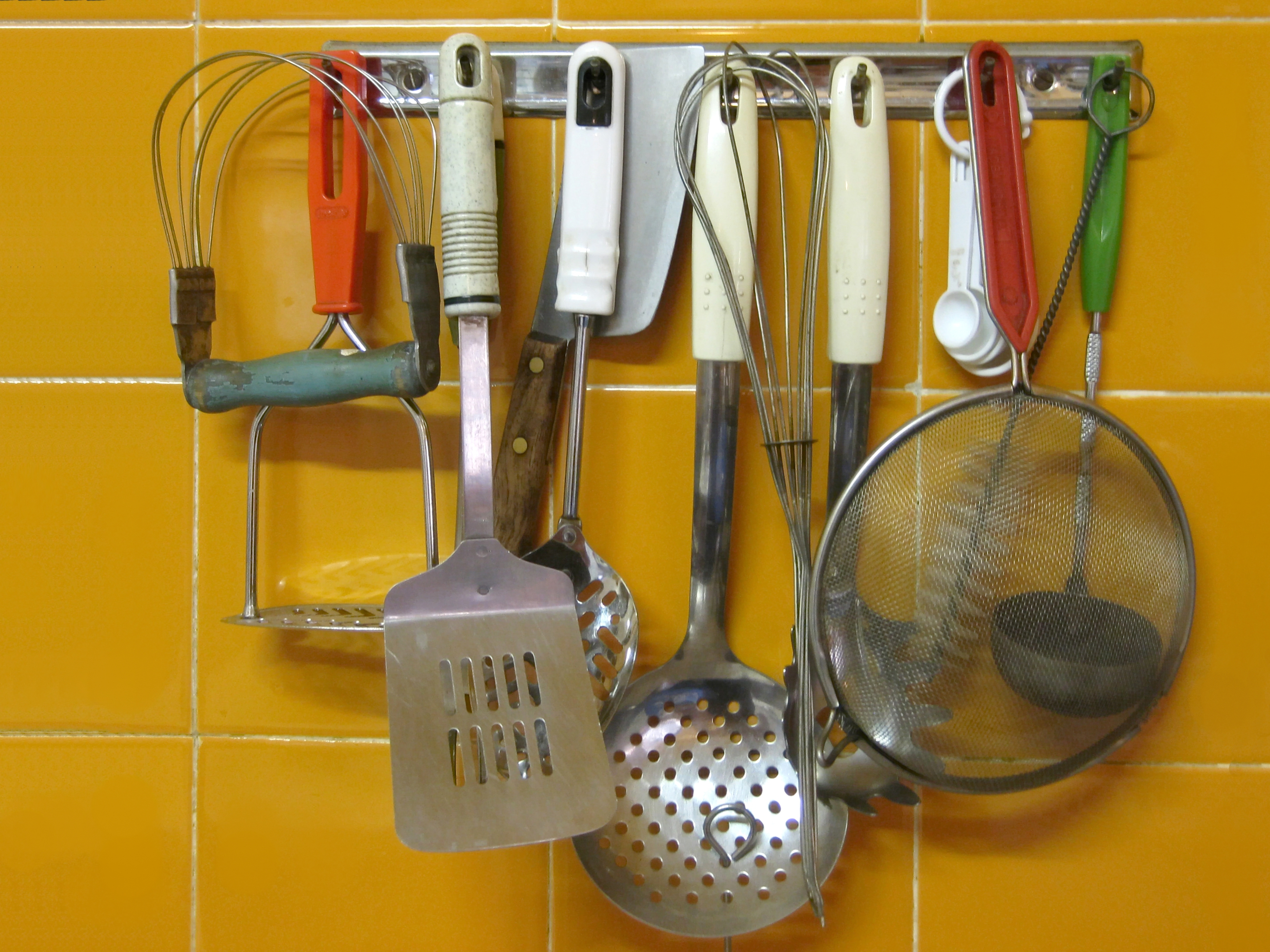
An assortment of utensils

A kitchen utensil is a hand-held, typically small tool that is designed for food-related functions. Food preparation utensils are a specific type of kitchen utensil, designed for use in the preparation of food. Some utensils are both food preparation utensils and eating utensils; for instance some implements of cutlery – especially knives – can be used for both food preparation in a kitchen and as eating utensils when dining (though most types of knives used in kitchens are unsuitable for use on the dining table).

In the Western world, utensil invention accelerated in the 19th and 20th centuries. It was fuelled in part by the emergence of technologies such as the kitchen stove and refrigerator, but also by a desire to save time in the kitchen, in response to the demands of modern lifestyles.

== List ==
List of food preparation utensils
Name	Alternative names	Purpose in food preparation	Design	Image
Apple corer		To remove the core and pips from apples and similar fruits		
Apple cutter		To cut apple and similar fruits easily while simultaneously removing the core and pips.	Cf. peeler	
Baster		Used during cooking to cover meat in its own juices or with a sauce.	An implement resembling a simple pipette, consisting of a tube to hold the liquid, and a rubber top which makes use of a partial vacuum to control the liquid's intake and release. The process of drizzling the liquid over meat is called basting – when a pastry brush is used in place of a baster, it is known as a basting brush.	
Beanpot		A deep, wide-bellied, short-necked vessel used to cook bean-based dishes	Beanpots are typically made of ceramic, though pots made of other materials, like cast iron, can also be found. The relatively narrow mouth of the beanpot minimizes evaporation and heat loss, while the deep, wide, thick-walled body of the pot facilitates long, slow cooking times. They are typically glazed both inside and out, and so cannot be used for clay pot cooking.	
Biscuit press	Cookie press	A device for making pressed cookies such as spritzgebäck.	It consists of a cylinder with a plunger on one end which is used to extrude cookie dough through a small hole at the other end. Typically the cookie press has interchangeable perforated plates with holes in different shapes, such as a star shape or a narrow slit to extrude the dough in ribbons.	
Blow torch	Blowtorch, blowlamp	Commonly used to create a hard layer of caramelized sugar in a crème brûlée.		
Boil over preventer	Milk watcher, Milk guard, Pot minder	Preventing liquids from boiling over outside of the pot	A disc with a raised rim, designed to ensure an even distribution of temperature throughout the pot. This prevents bubbles from forming in liquids such as milk, or water which contains starch (for instance if used to cook pasta). Can be made of metal, glass or ceramic materials.	
Bottle opener		Twists or pulls the metal cap off of a bottle		
Bowl		To hold food, including food that is ready to be served	A round, open topped container, capable of holding liquid. Materials used to make bowls vary considerably, and include wood, glass and ceramic materials.	
Bread knife		To cut bread	A serrated blade made of metal, and long enough to slice across a large loaf of bread. Using a sawing motion, instead of pushing force as with most knives, it is possible to slice the loaf without squashing it.	
Browning tray	Browning plate, Browning bowl	Used in a microwave oven to help turn food brown	Generally made of glass or porcelain to absorb heat, which helps colour the layer of food in contact with its surface.	
Butter curler		Used to produce decorative butter shapes.		
Cake and pie server	Cake shovel, pie cutter	To cut slices in pies or cakes, and then transfer to a plate or container	This utensil typically features a thin edge to assist with slicing, and a large face, to hold the slice whilst transferring to a plate, bowl or other container.	
Cheese cutter		Designed to cut soft, sticky cheeses (moist and oily).	The cutting edge of cheese cutters are typically a fine gauge stainless steel or aluminium wire.	
Cheese knife		Used to cut cheese.		
Cheese slicer		Used to cut semi-hard and hard cheeses. It produces thin, even slices.		
Cheesecloth		To assist in the formation of cheese	A gauzed cotton cloth, used to remove whey from cheese curds, and to help hold the curds together as the cheese is formed.	
Chef's knife		Originally used to slice large cuts of beef, it is now the general utility knife for most Western cooks.		
Cherry pitter	Olive stoner	Used for the removal of pits (stones) from cherries or olives.		
Chinois	Chinoise	Straining substances such as custards, soups and sauces, or to dust food with powder	A conical sieve	
Clay pot		A cooking pot made out of clay		
Cleaver		Hacking through bone or slicing large vegetables (such as squash). The knife's broad side can also be used for crushing in food preparation (such as garlic).	A large broad bladed knife.	
Colander		Used for draining substances cooked in water	A bowl-shaped container with holes, typically made from plastic or metal. It differs from a sieve due to its larger holes, allowing larger pieces of food, such as pasta, to be drained quickly.	
Cookie cutter	Biscuit mould, Biscuit cutter, Cookie mould	Shaping biscuit dough	Generally made of metal or plastic, with fairly sharp edges to cut through dough. Some biscuit cutters simply cut through dough that has been rolled flat, others also imprint or mould the dough's surface.	
Corkscrew		Pierces and removes a cork from a bottle.		Corkscrew
Crab cracker	Lobster cracker	Used to crack the shell of a crab or lobster	A clamping device, similar in design to a nutcracker but larger, with ridges on the inside to grip the shell.	
Cutting board		A portable board on which food can be cut.	Usually smaller and lighter than butcher's blocks, generally made from wood or plastic.	
Dough scraper	Bench scraper, Scraper, Bench knife	To shape or cut dough, and remove dough from a worksurface	Most dough scrapers consist of handle wide enough to be held in one or two hands, and an equally wide, flat, steel face.	
Edible tableware		Varies	Tableware, such as plates, glasses, utensils and cutlery, that is edible	
Egg piercer		Pierces the air pocket of an eggshell with a small needle to keep the shell from cracking during hard-boiling. If both ends of the shell are pierced, the egg can be blown out while preserving the shell (for crafts).		
Egg poacher		Holds a raw egg, and is placed inside a pot of boiling water to poach an egg.		
Egg separator		A slotted spoon-like utensil used to separate the yolk of an egg from the egg white.		
Egg slicer		Slicing peeled, hard-boiled eggs quickly and evenly.	Consists of a slotted dish for holding the egg and a hinged plate of wires or blades that can be closed to slice.	
Egg timer		Used to correctly time the process of boiling eggs.	Historical designs range considerably, from hourglasses, to mechanical or electronic timers, to electronic devices which sense the water temperature and calculate the boiling rate.	Classic egg timer in hour glass model
Fat separator		Device used to defat or separate fat from stocks or gravies.		
Fillet knife		A long, narrow knife with a finely serrated blade, used to slice fine filet cuts of fish or other meat.		
Fish scaler	Urokotori	Used to remove the scales from the skin of fish before cooking		
Fish slice	Spatula, turner	Used for lifting or turning food during cooking		
Flour sifter		Blends flour with other ingredients and aerates it in the process.		
Food mill		Used to mash or sieve soft foods.	Typically consists of a bowl, a plate with holes like a colander, and a crank with a bent metal blade which crushes the food and forces it through the holes.	
Funnel		Used to channel liquid or fine-grained substances into containers with a small opening.	A pipe with a wide, conical mouth and a narrow stem.	
Garlic press		Presses garlic cloves to create a puree, functioning like a specialized ricer.		
Grapefruit knife		Finely serrated knife for separating segments of grapefruit or other citrus fruit.		
Grater	Cheese grater, Shredder	Used to grate cheeses, spices, citrus and other foods		
Gravy strainer	Gravy separator	A small pouring jug that separates roast meat drippings from melted fat, for making gravy.		
Honey dipper		Drizzles honey.		
Ladle		A ladle is a type of serving spoon used for soup, stew, or other foods.		
Lame		Used to slash the tops of bread loaves in artisan baking.		
Lélé	Baton Lélé	A six-pronged wooden stick used in Caribbean cooking like a whisk.		
Lemon reamer		A juicer with a fluted peak at the end of a short handle, where a half a lemon is pressed to release the juice.		
Lemon squeezer		A juicer, similar in function to a lemon reamer, with an attached bowl.	Operated by pressing the fruit against a fluted peak to release the juice into the bowl.	
Lobster pick	Lobster fork	A long-handled, narrow pick, used to pull meat out of narrow legs and other parts of a lobster or crab.		
Mandoline		A mandoline is used for slicing and for cutting juliennes; with suitable attachments, it can make crinkle-cuts.		
Mated colander pot	Multi-pot; multi-cooker	Boiling pasta, steaming vegetables	A pot and a slightly smaller tightly fitting colander	
Measuring cup: DRY			metal or plastic with straight handle. no spout	
Measuring cup: LIQUID	Measuring jug, Measuring jar		The Pyrex-brand traditional measuring cup (the Anchor Hocking-brand look-alike is shown, right) is available in sizes of 1 cup (~240 mL), 2 cups (~480 mL), 4 cups (~960 mL), and 8 cups (~1,920 mL); and includes U.S. customary units in quarter, third, half and two-thirds cup increments, as well as metric units.	
Measuring spoon		Typically sold in a set that measures dry or wet ingredients in amounts from 1/4 tsp (1 mL) up to 1 tbsp (15 mL).		
Meat grinder	Mincer	Operated with a hand-crank, this presses meat through a chopping or pureeing attachment.		
Meat tenderiser		Used to tenderize meats in preparation for cooking. Usually shaped like a mallet.		
Meat thermometer		Thermometer used to measure the internal temperature of meats and other cooked foods.		
Melon baller		Small scoop used to make smooth balls of melon or other fruit, or potatoes.		
Mezzaluna	Herb Chopper	To finely and consistently chop/mince foods, especially herbs.		
Microplane		To zest citrus fruits or finely grate hard foods such as cheese.		
Milk frother		To make foam or froth in milk for coffee.	Essentially a small battery powered electric mixer.	
Mortar and pestle	Molcajete	To crush food, releasing flavours and aromas	Generally made from either porcelain or wood, the mortar is shaped as a bowl. The pestle, generally shaped like a small club, is used to forcefully squeeze ingredients such as herbs against the mortar.	
Nutcracker		To crack open the hard outer shell of various nuts.		
Nutmeg grater		A small, specialized grating blade for nutmeg.		
Oven glove	Oven mitt	To protect hands from burning when handling hot pots or trays.		
Pastry bag		To evenly dispense soft substances (doughs, icings, fillings, etc.).		
Pastry blender		Cuts into pastry ingredients, such as flour and butter, for blending and mixing while they are in a bowl. It is made of wires curved into a crescent shape and held by a rigid handle.		
Pastry brush	Basting brush	To spread oil, juices, sauce or glaze on food.	Some brushes have wooden handles and natural or plastic bristles, whilst others have metal or plastic handles and silicone bristles.	
Pastry wheel		Cuts straight or crimped lines through dough for pastry or pasta.		
Peel	Pizza shovel	Used to transfer whole pizzas or dough from surface to surface.		
Peeler	Potato peeler Vegetable peeler	Removes the outer layer or skin of a vegetable.		
Pepper mill	Burr mill, burr grinder, pepper grinder	Grinds peppercorns into smaller pepper flakes or powder.		
Pie bird	Pie vent, pie funnel	Allows heat and steam to escape, preventing the pie from leaking or boiling over.		
Pizza cutter	Pizza slicer	Cuts pizzas into more manageable slices.		
Potato masher	Crushes soft foods into a mixture.			
Potato ricer	Ricer	Presses very smooth vegetable mashes or purees, operates similar to a meat grinder/mincer.		
Pot-holder		A textile surface used to insulate the user from high temperatures.		
Poultry shears		Used for dejointing and cutting uncooked poultry; reinforced with a spring, they have one serrated blade and pointed tips.		
Roller docker		Used to pierce bread dough, cracker dough, pizza dough or pastry dough to prevent over rising or blistering.		
Rolling pin		A long, rounded wooden or marble tool rolled across dough to flatten it.		
Salt shaker		Distributes salt or pepper grains evenly onto a surface		
Scales	Kitchen scales, Weighing scales	Weights ingredients for more accurate cooking.		
Scissors	Kitchen scissors	Two blades used to shear surfaces.		
Scoop	Ice cream scoop	Used to scoop circular portions of food from a larger container.		
Sieve	Sifter, Strainer			
Slotted spoon	Skimmer	Used to remove solids such as fats or unwanted debris from the surface of a cooking liquid.		
Spider	Sieve, spoon sieve, spoon skimmer, basket skimmer	For removing hot food from a liquid or skimming foam off when making broths	A wide shallow wire-mesh basket with a long handle	
Spoon rest	dublé	To lay spoons and other cooking utensils, to prevent cooking fluids from getting onto countertops		
Sugar thermometer	Candy thermometer	Measuring the temperature, or stage, of sugar		
Tamis	Drum sieve	Used as a strainer, grater, or food mill.	A tamis has a cylindrical edge, made of metal or wood, that supports a disc of fine metal, nylon, or horsehair mesh. Ingredients are pushed through the mesh.	
Tin opener	Can opener	To open tins or cans	Designs vary considerably; the earliest tin openers were knives, adapted to open a tin as easily as possible.	
Tomato knife		Used to slice through tomatoes.	A small serrated knife.	
Tongs		For gripping and lifting. Usually used to move items on hot surfaces, such as barbecues, or to select small or grouped items, such as sugar cubes or salad portions.	Two long arms with a pivot near the handle.	
Trussing needle		For pinning, or sewing up, poultry and other meat.	Needle, about 20 cm long and about 3mm in diameter, sometimes with a blade at end for pushing through poultry	
Twine	Butcher's twine, Cooking twine, Kitchen string, Kitchen twine	For trussing roasts of meat or poultry.	Twine must be cotton—never synthetic—and must be natural—never bleached—in order to be "food grade".	
Whisk	Balloon whisk, gravy whisk, flat whisk, flat coil whisk, bell whisk, and other types.	To blend ingredients smooth, or to incorporate air into a mixture, in a process known as whisking or whipping	Most whisks consist of a long, narrow handle with a series of wire loops joined at the end. Whisks are also made from bamboo.	
Wooden spoon		For mixing and stirring during cooking and baking.		
Zester		For obtaining zest from lemons and other citrus fruit.	A handle and a curved metal end, the top of which is perforated with a row of round holes with sharpened rims	

== See also ==
- Cookware and bakeware
- Home appliance
- Kitchen utensil
- List of cooking appliances
- List of cooking techniques
- List of eating utensils
- List of food preparation techniques
- List of Japanese cooking utensils
- List of serving utensils
- Timeline of culinary technologies
