= Grapefruit (disambiguation) =

Grapefruit is a type of citrus fruit.

Grapefruit may also refer to:

- Grapefruit (band), a 1960s pop band
- Grapefruit (Maaya Sakamoto album), 1997
- Grapefruit (Kiran Leonard album), 2016
- Grapefruit (book), a 1964 book by Yoko Ono
- Grapefruit (music label), an American record label based in Brooklyn, New York, US

== See also ==
- Grapefruit diet, a type of diet
- Grapefruit knife, a knife designed for cutting grapefruit
- Grapefruit spoon, a spoon with teeth at its edge
- Grape, an unrelated type of fruit
