= List of serving utensils =

This is a list of serving utensils.

- Knives
  - Splayd
  - Sporf
  - Cheese knife
  - Spife
  - Knork
  - Butter knife
  - Cake and pie server
- Spoons
  - Spork
  - Caviar spoon
  - Ladle (spoon)
  - Salt spoon
  - Scoop (utensil)
  - Slotted spoon
  - Sugar spoon
  - Fruit Spoon
- Miscellaneous
  - Tritensil
  - Spifork
  - Chork
  - Forkchops
  - Pizza Fork
  - Bombilla
  - FRED(Field Ration Eating Device)
  - Toffee hammer
  - Tongs
  - Luncheon knife
  - Grapefruit knife

== See also ==
- Holloware
- List of eating utensils
- List of food preparation utensils
- List of types of spoons

scraper
