= Spritz =

Spritz may refer to:

- Hair spray
- Spritz (cocktail), an aperitif consisting of wine, sparkling water, and liqueur
- Spritz (wine), a term referring to small amounts of carbon dioxide added to wine
- Spritz (cipher), a cryptographic stream cipher and hash function by Rivest and Schuldt.

== See also ==
- Spritzer
- Spritzgebäck, a type of Christmas cookie
