= Cooking and eating utensils =

Cooking and eating utensils may refer to:

- Cookware and bakeware, cooking containers
- List of food preparation utensils, food preparation utensils
- Cutlery, eating utensils
- Chopsticks, used for both cooking and eating in Asian countries
