= Juicy Salif =

Citrus reamer designed by Philippe Starck

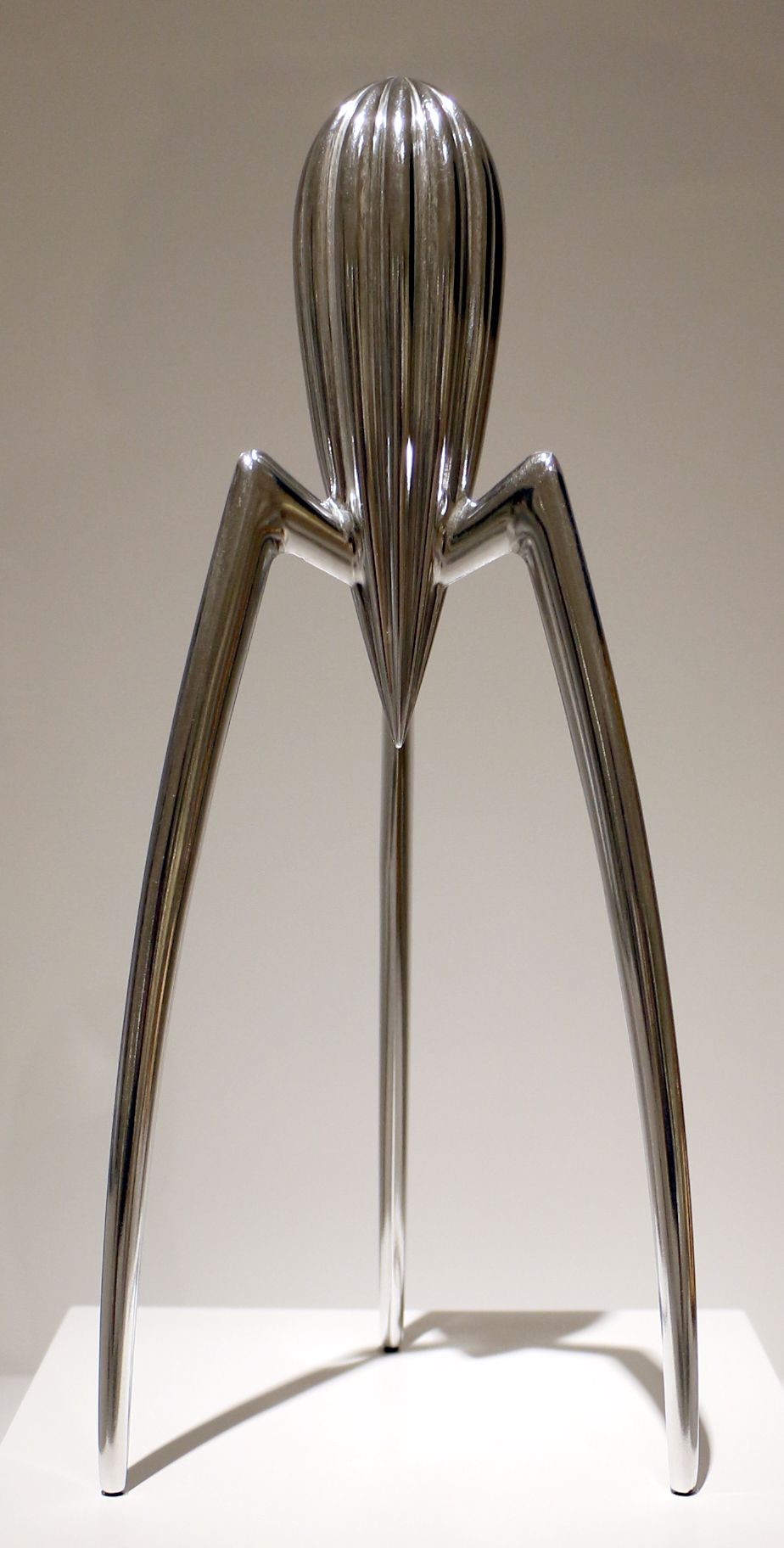
- Juicy Salif by Philippe Starck
- Type: Citrus reamer
- Inception: 1990
- Manufacturer: Alessi S.p.A.

Juicy Salif, a citrus reamer designed by Philippe Starck in 1990, is considered an icon of industrial design, and has been displayed in the permanent collections of the Museum of Modern Art and the Metropolitan Museum of Art in New York City, as well as the Victoria and Albert Museum in London. It has also received this distinction at the Rhode Island School of Design Museum and the Museum of Fine Arts, Houston.

== Description ==
Made of cast and polished aluminum by the Italian kitchenware company Alessi, the tool measures 14 centimetres (5.5 in) in diameter, and 29 cm (11 in) in height.

== History ==
Brief interview with Alberto Alessi by Dezeen (video)

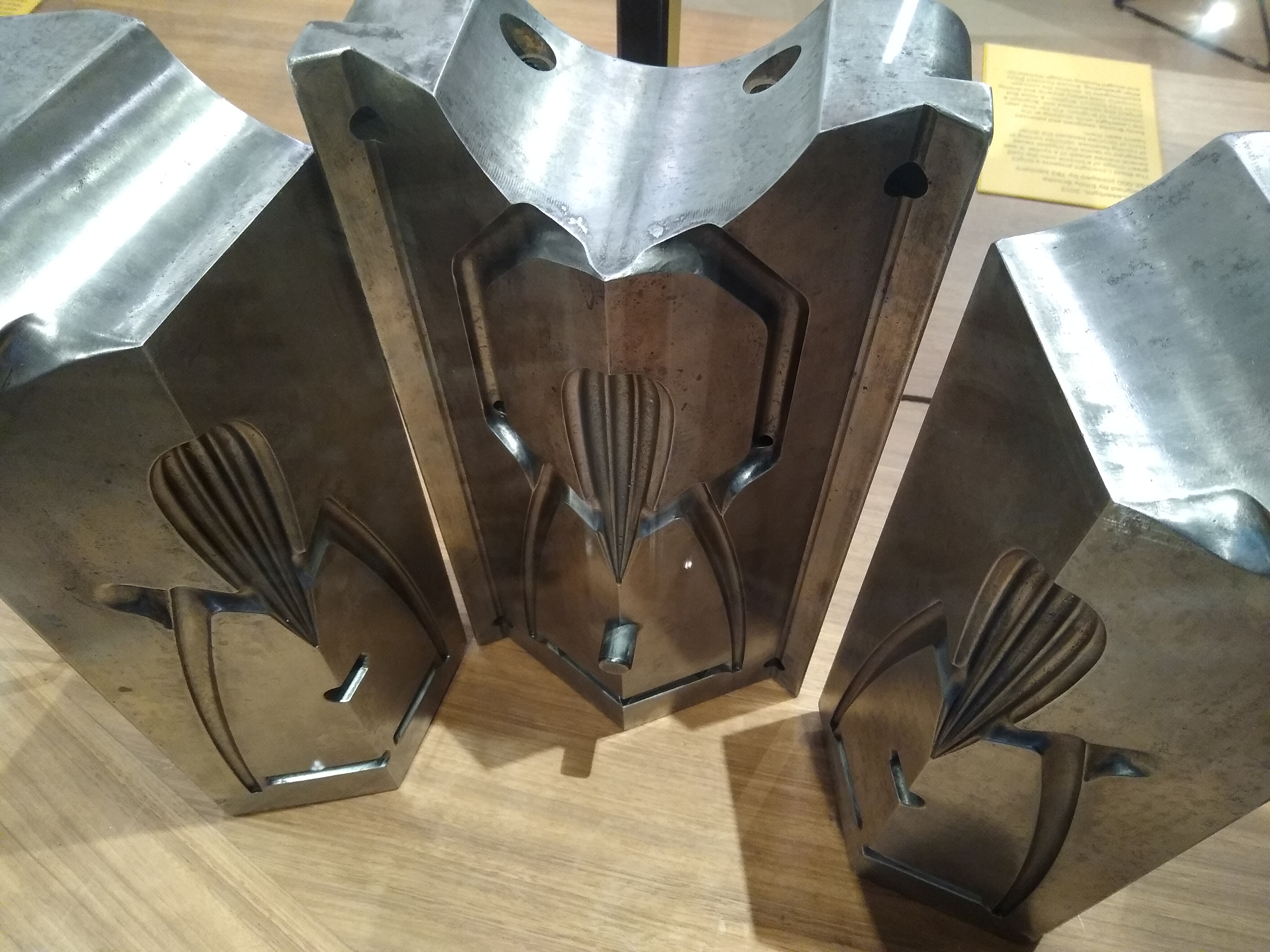
A Juicy Salif mould at the Design Museum in London

The sleek, exotic-looking shape was inspired by a calamari squid.

The president of the manufacturer, Alberto Alessi, later recalled:

I received a napkin from Starck, on it among some incomprehensible marks (tomato sauce, in all likelihood) there were some sketches. Sketches of squid. They started on the left, and as they worked their way over to the right, they took on the unmistakable shape of what was to become the juicy salif. While eating a dish of squid and squeezing a lemon over it, Starck drew on the napkin his famous lemon squeezer.

Alberto Alessi, in a recorded video interview posted on Dezeen, said "I am very happy with this project because I consider it a big joke to everybody. [...] It is the most controversial squeezer of the century I must say, but one of the most amusing projects I have done in my career." He regarded it as one of the company's most successful products.

== Sales ==
For the tenth anniversary of its launch, 10,000 Juicy Salifs were issued, individually numbered and gold-plated. But this luxury version came with instructions warning that the juicer should never be used with actual fruit, because the finish would corrode. There has also been a grey/black (anthracite) coloured version, of which 47,000 un-numbered examples were produced between 1991 and 2004. Both now are collector's items, though an urban legend perpetuates the idea that the anthracite version is rarer than the gold-plated one.

By 2003, a total of more than 500,000 of the iconic design artifacts had been sold.

== Critical reception ==
Starck has publicly stated that his citrus reamer was "not meant to squeeze lemons" but "to start conversations".

An image of the Juicy Salif was featured on the front cover of Donald Norman's book Emotional Design. The gold-plated version was described as an "ornament" because citric acid from fruit would discolor and erode the gold plating.

An article in the Financial Times about bad design included the Juicy Salif among other examples, and proposed that the original "chamber of horrors" at the Victoria and Albert Museum be revived, to showcase modern examples.
