= Lemon squeezer =

Kitchen utensil

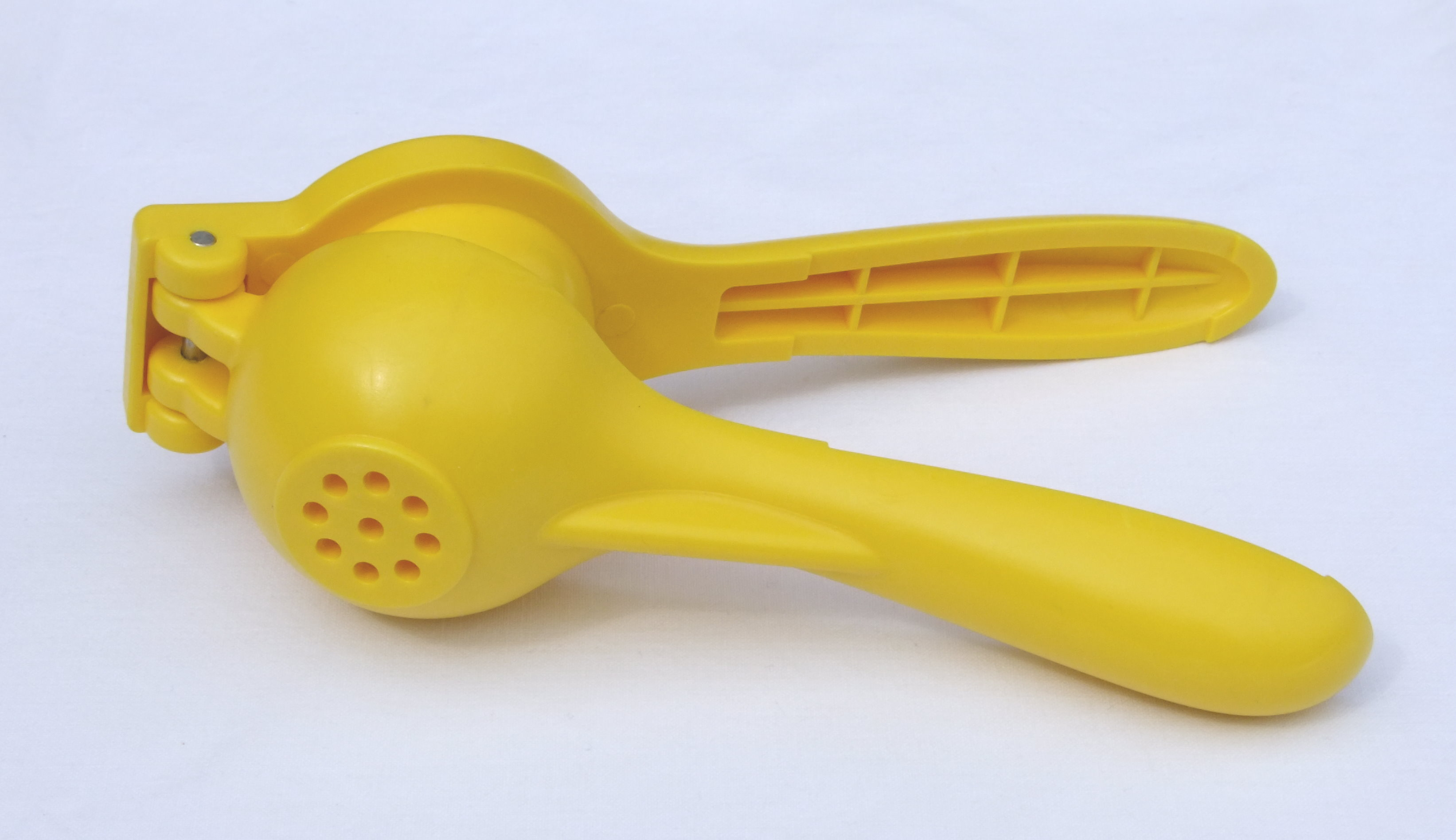
A modern plastic handheld lemon squeezer

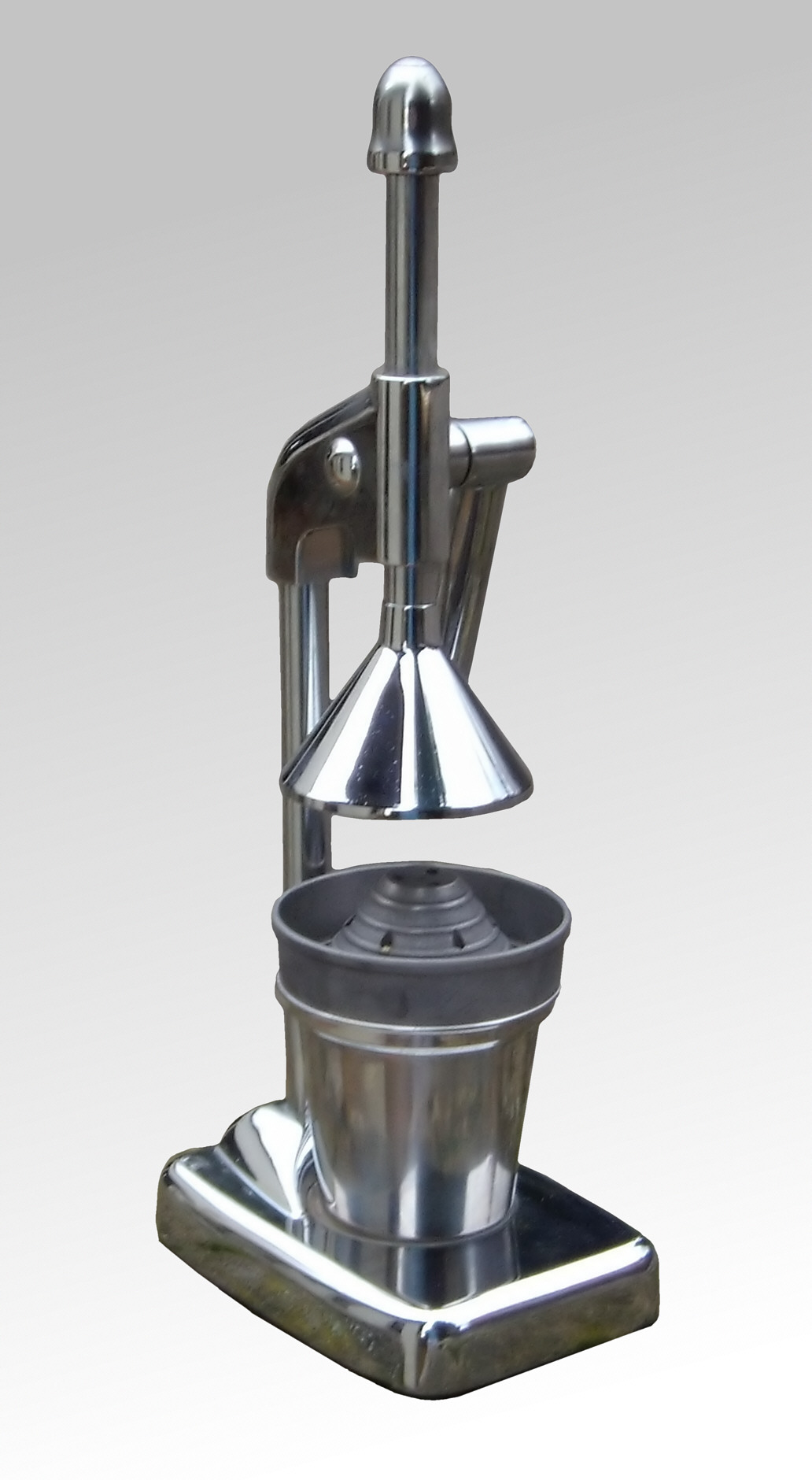
A metal countertop lemon squeezer

A lemon squeezer is a kitchen utensil designed to extract juice from lemons or other citrus fruit such as oranges, grapefruit, or lime. It is designed to separate and crush the pulp of the fruit in a way that is easy to operate. Lemon squeezers can be made from any solid, acid-resistant material, such as plastic, glass, metal (usually aluminium) or ceramic.

== History ==
The oldest known lemon squeezers were found in Kütahya, Turkey and date to the first quarter of the 18th century. These ceramic presses are in the traditional style of Turkish pottery of the 18th century and have a superficial resemblance to today's press equipment with cones, though they are designed differently. These examples were individually made, and specially designed for making the then popular citrus drink sorbet. Lemons are not native to northern Turkey, though during the 17th and 18th centuries they were imported in bulk to Constantinople.

At the end of the 19th century a large number of different models of lemon squeezers were patented in the United States. The U.S. Patent and Trademark Office lists over 200 patents for lemon squeezers, the majority of which were registered between 1880 and 1910. The oldest of these patents was issued to Lewis S. Chichester on July 3, 1860 for a cast iron squeezer. The stated purpose of the invention was "to obtain a simple, economical and durable implement whereby lemons may be squeezed for domestic purposes with much less power and with far greater facility than by the ordinary squeezers in general use."

The patents filed around the turn of the 19th/20th century show a variety of different functional principles. They range from small models to be used at the table (with which individual lemon wedges can be squeezed out over a glass or dish) to mechanically complex equipment which is firmly attached to the kitchen table or counter with screw clamps. It is noteworthy that nearly all of these patents merely put pressure on the lemon or lemon half, without the fruit being rotated. The patents vary mainly in their different mechanisms how they create this pressure. Usually, leverage or screw presses were used. It is no longer possible to reconstruct how many of those patents were actually produced for the market.

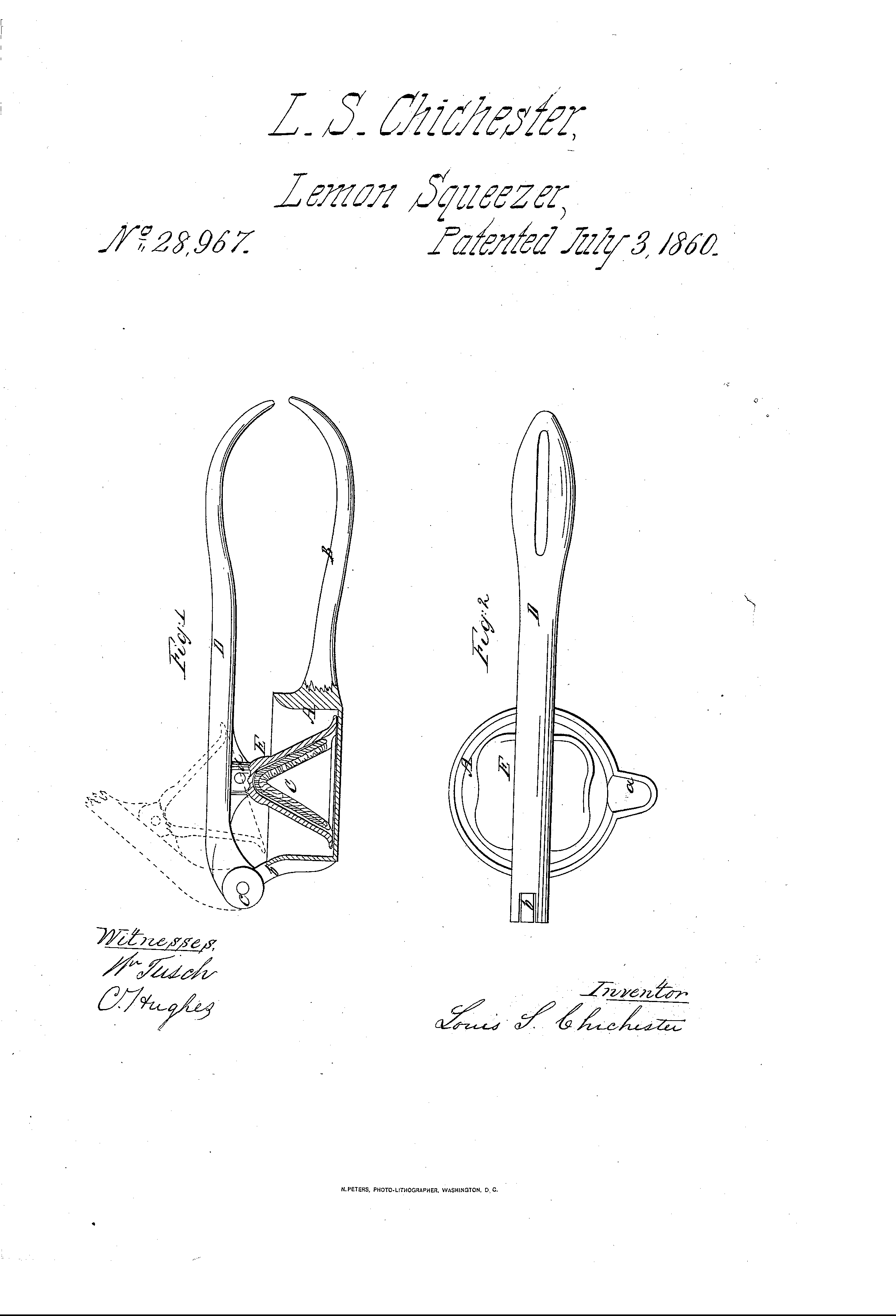
1860 L.P. Chichester lemon squeezer patent

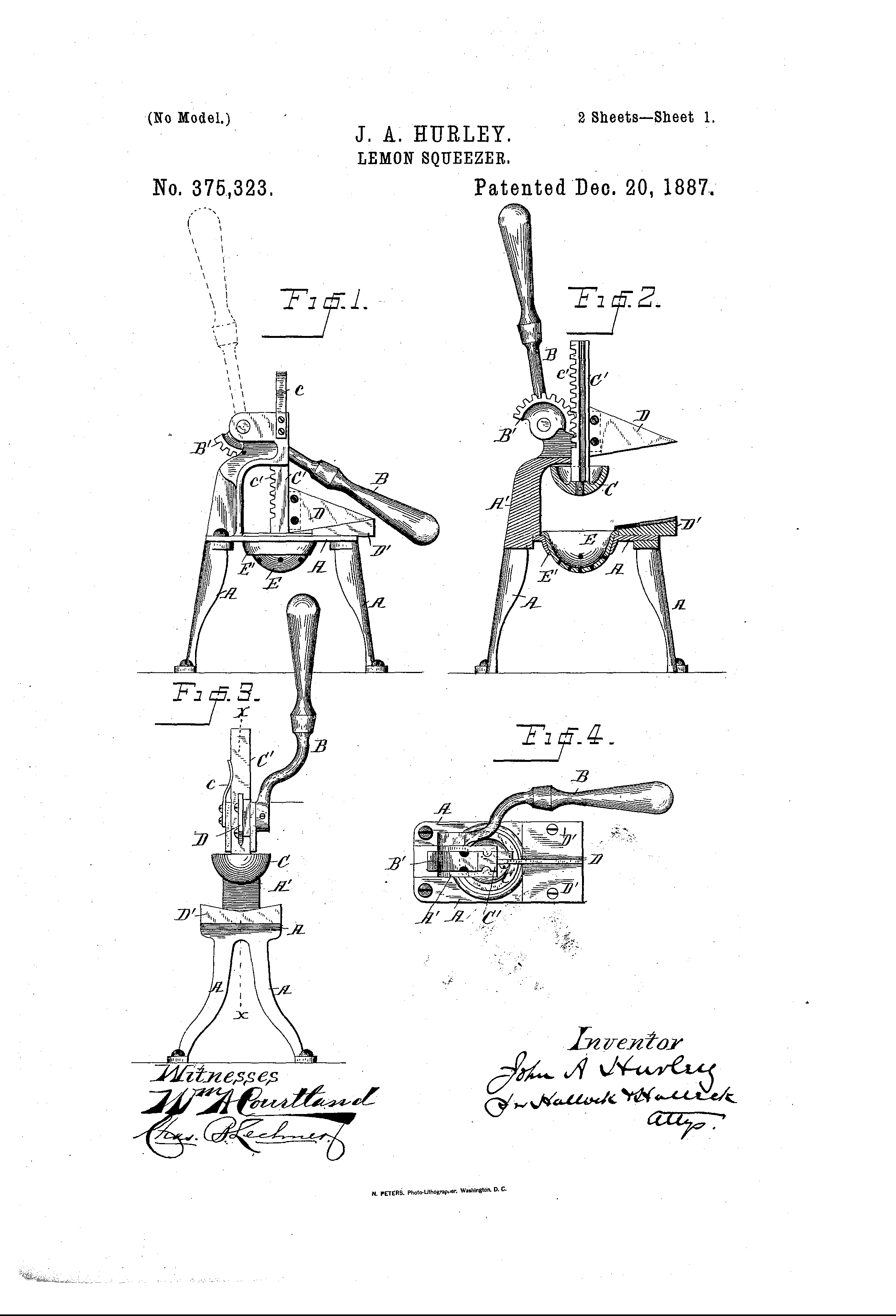
US patent for a lemon squeezer by Hurley, 1887

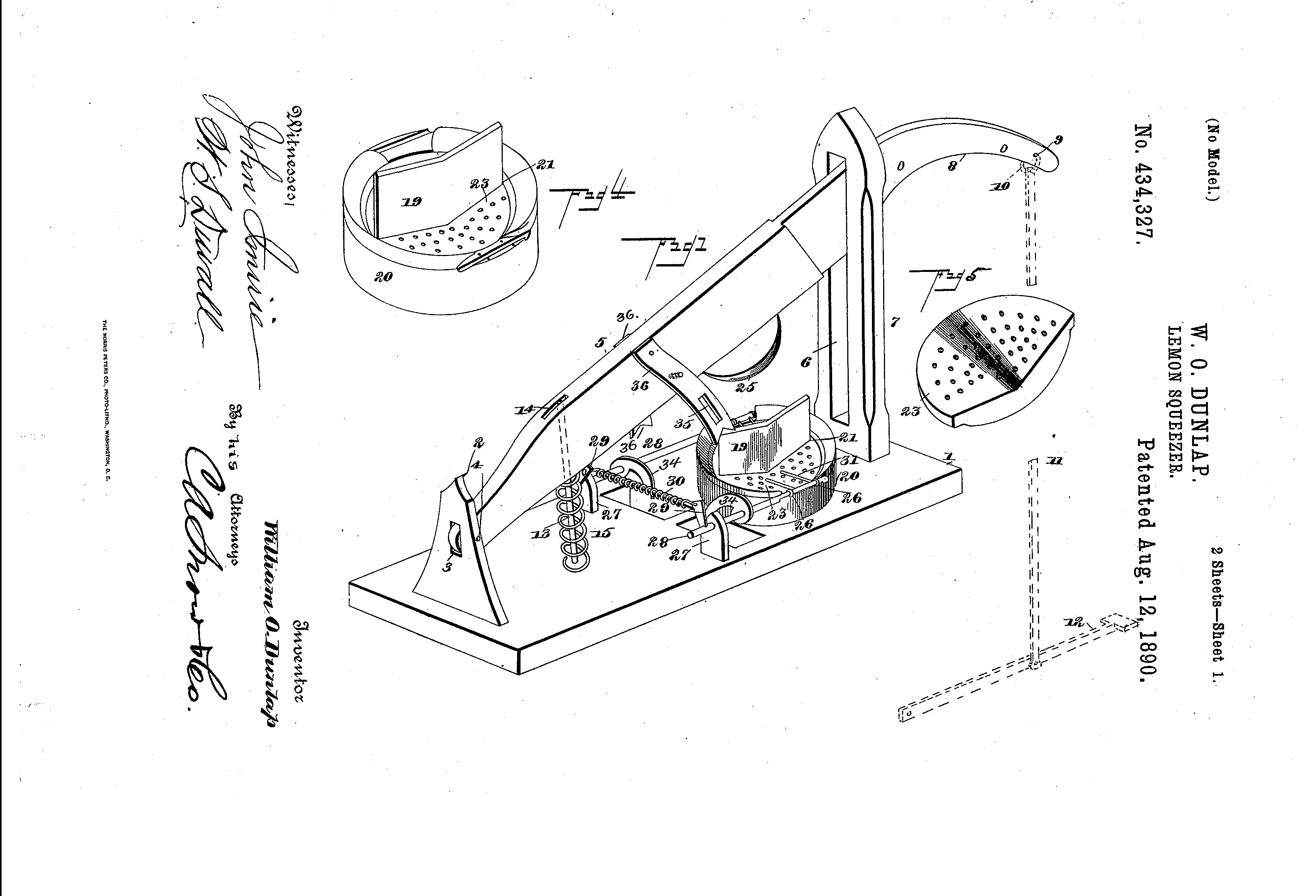
Dunlap, 1890

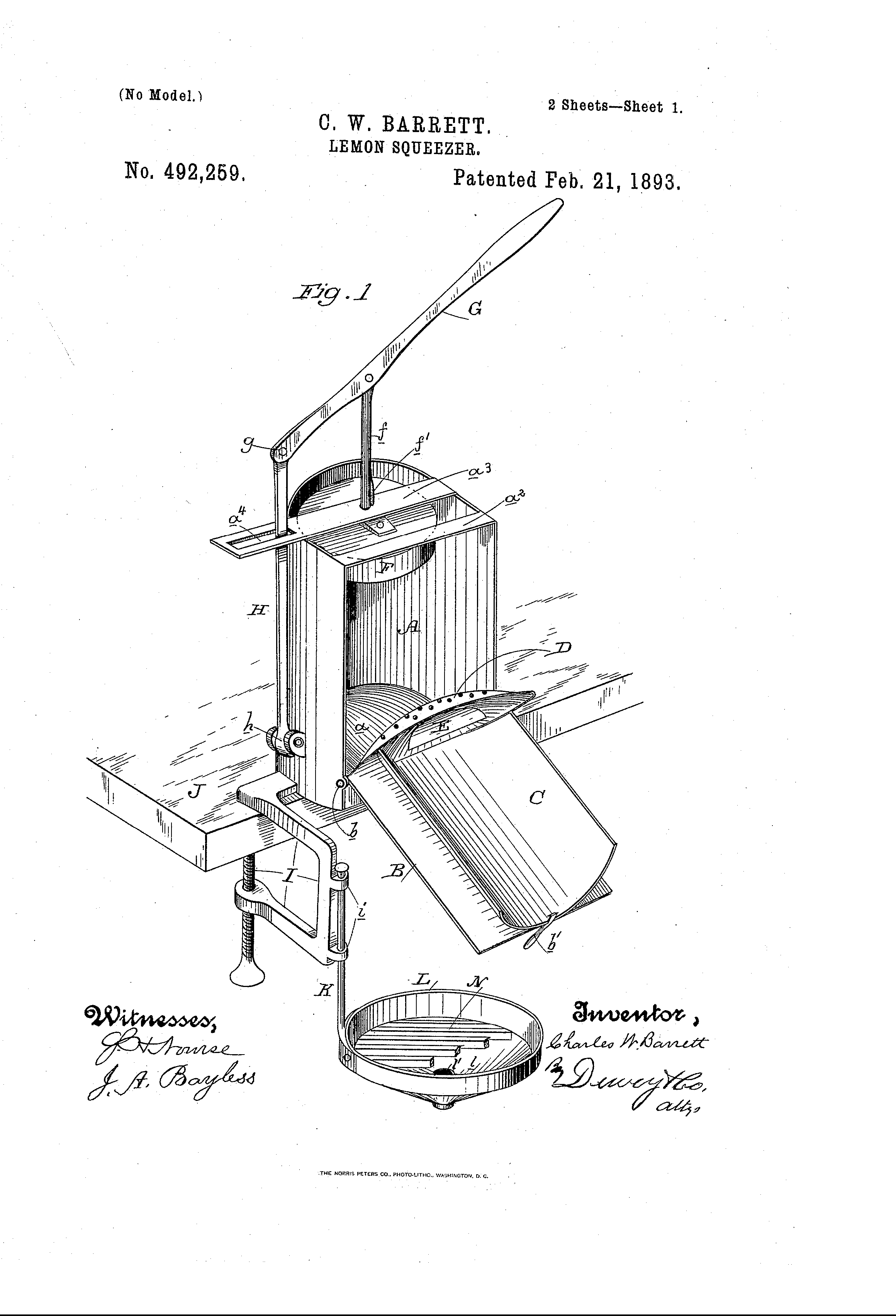
Barrett, 1893

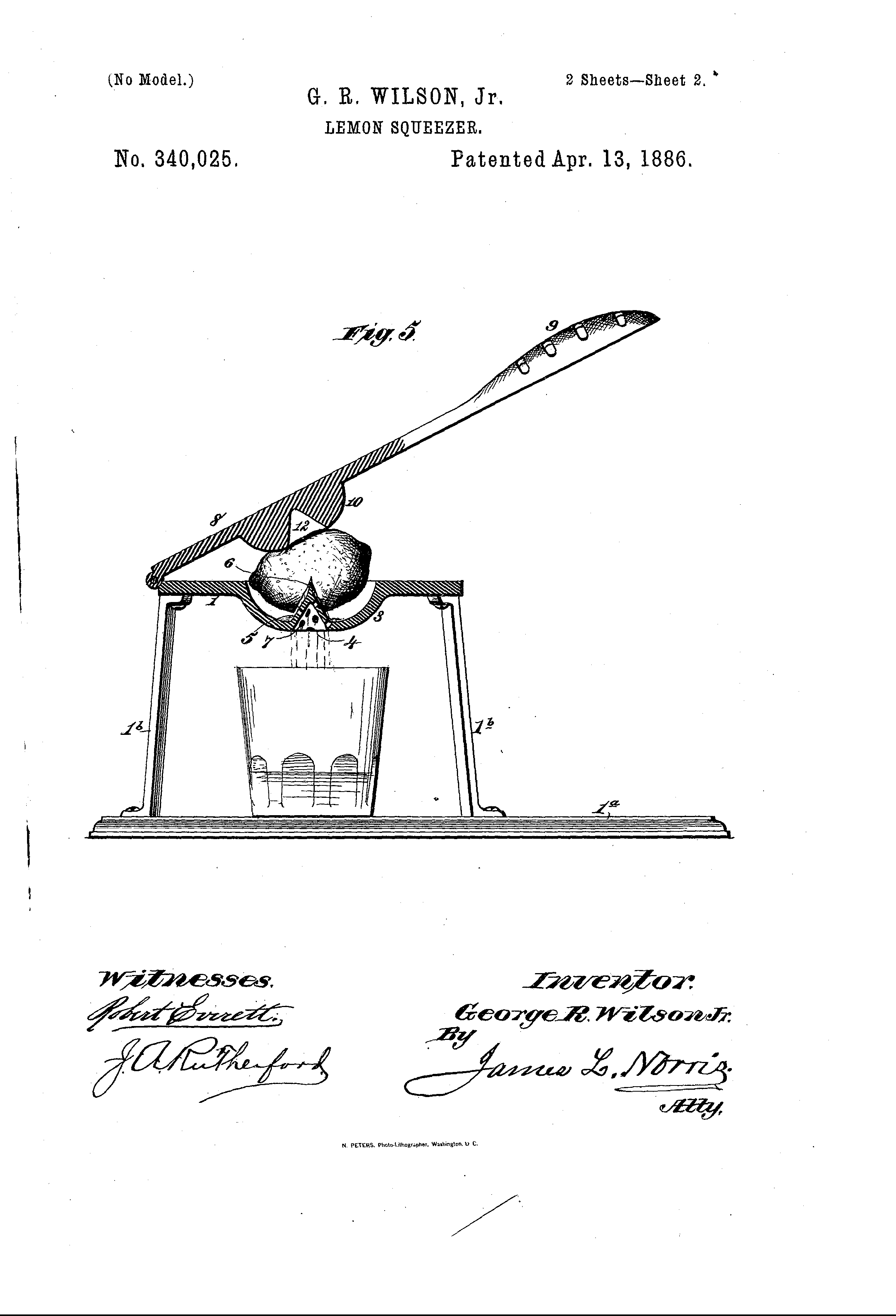
Wilson, 1886

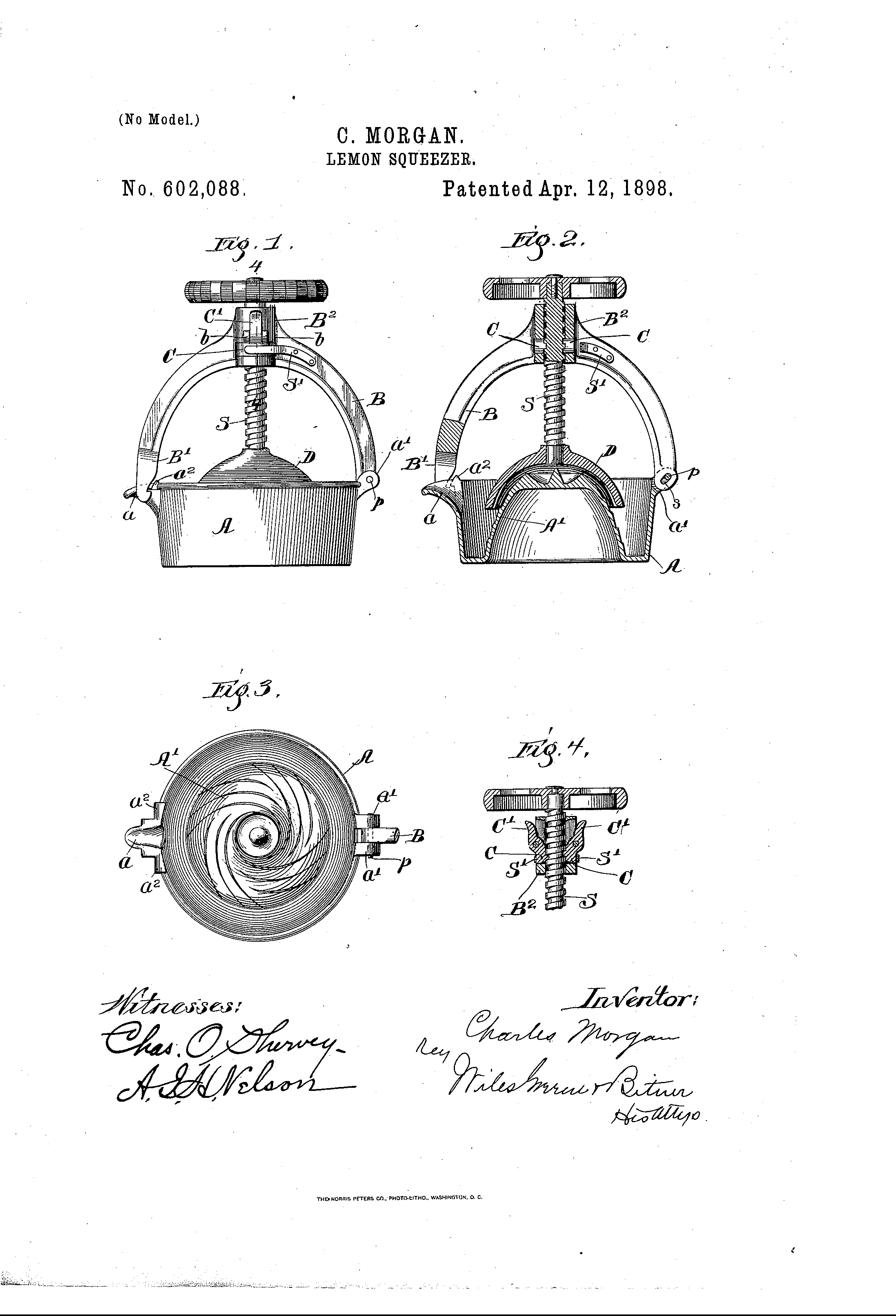
Morgan, 1896

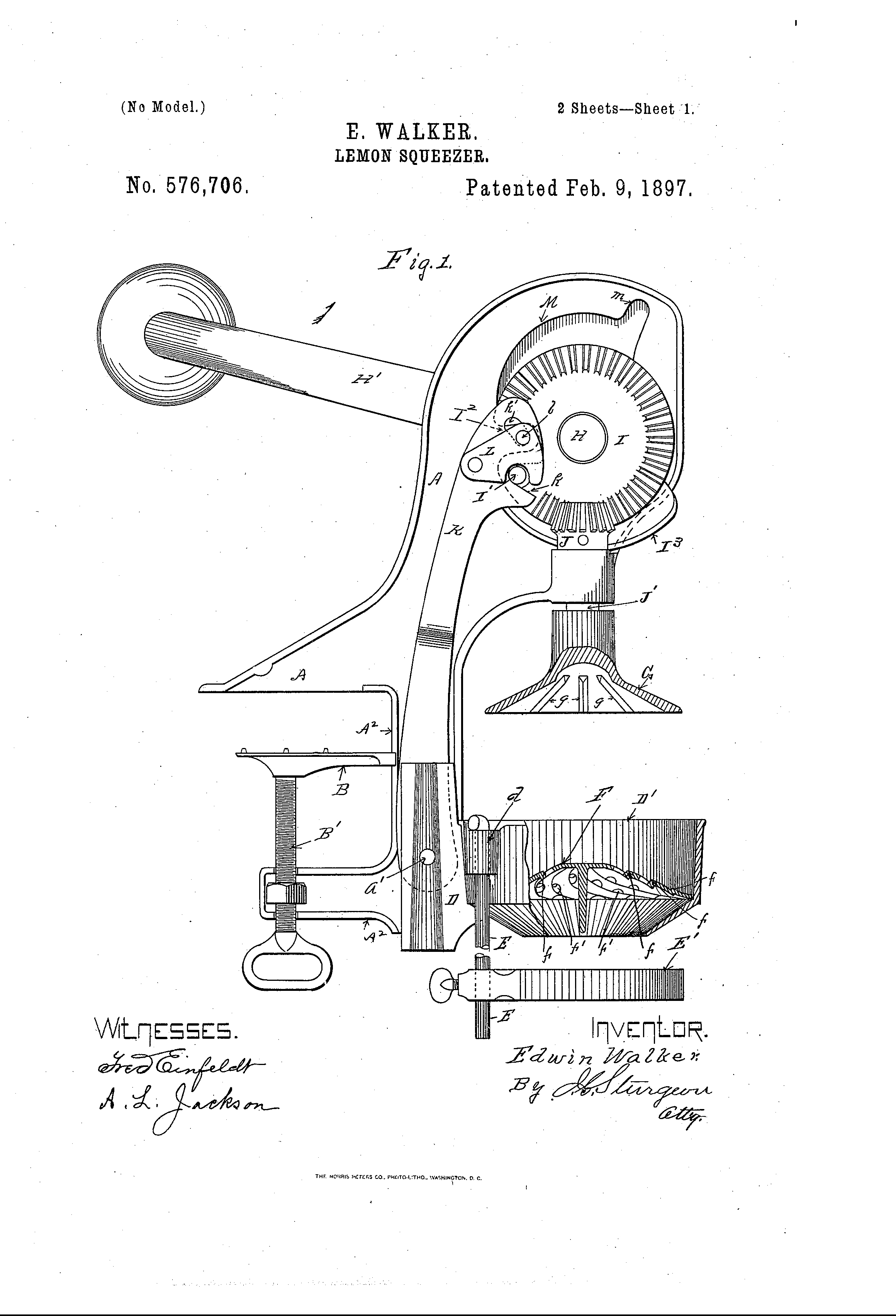
Walker, 1897

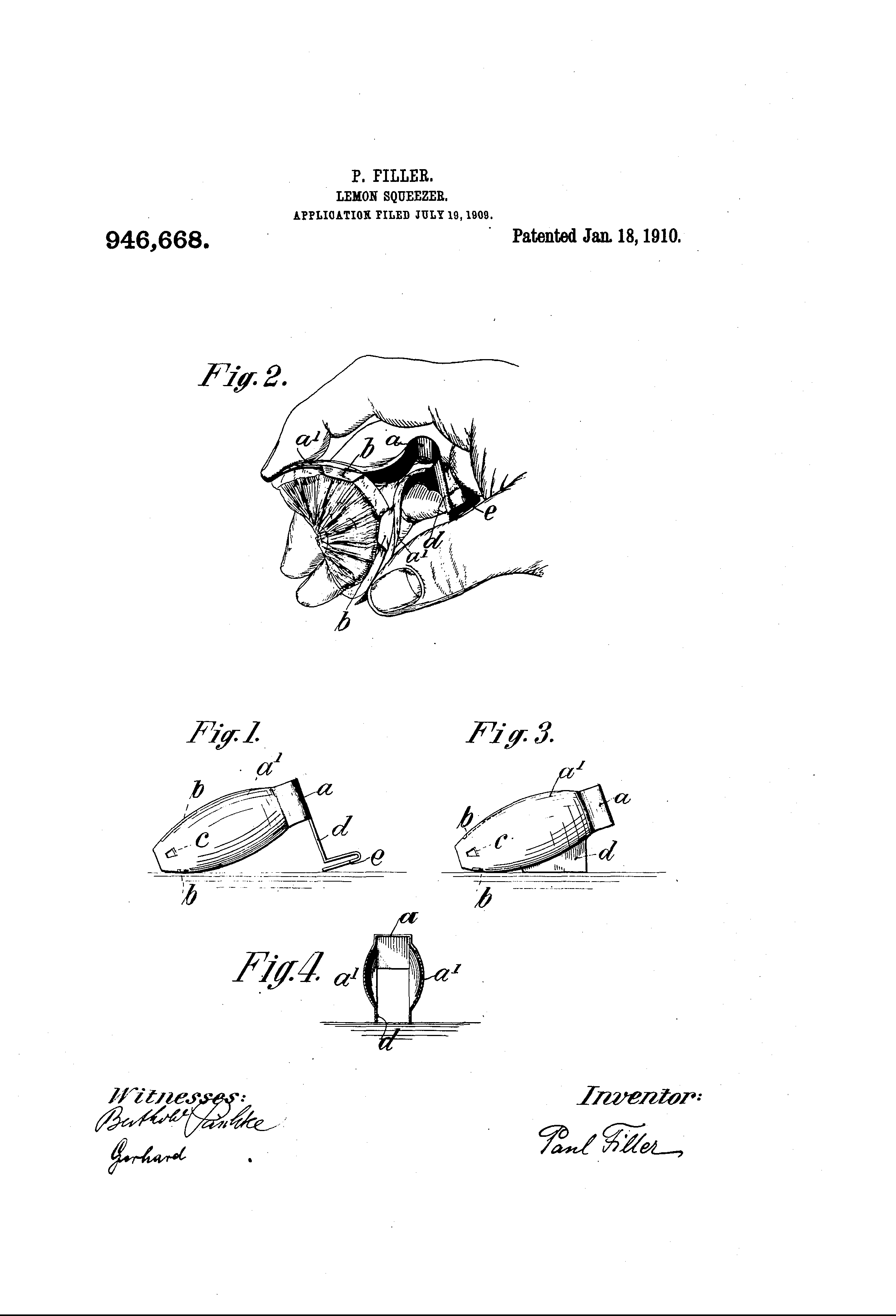
Filler, 1910

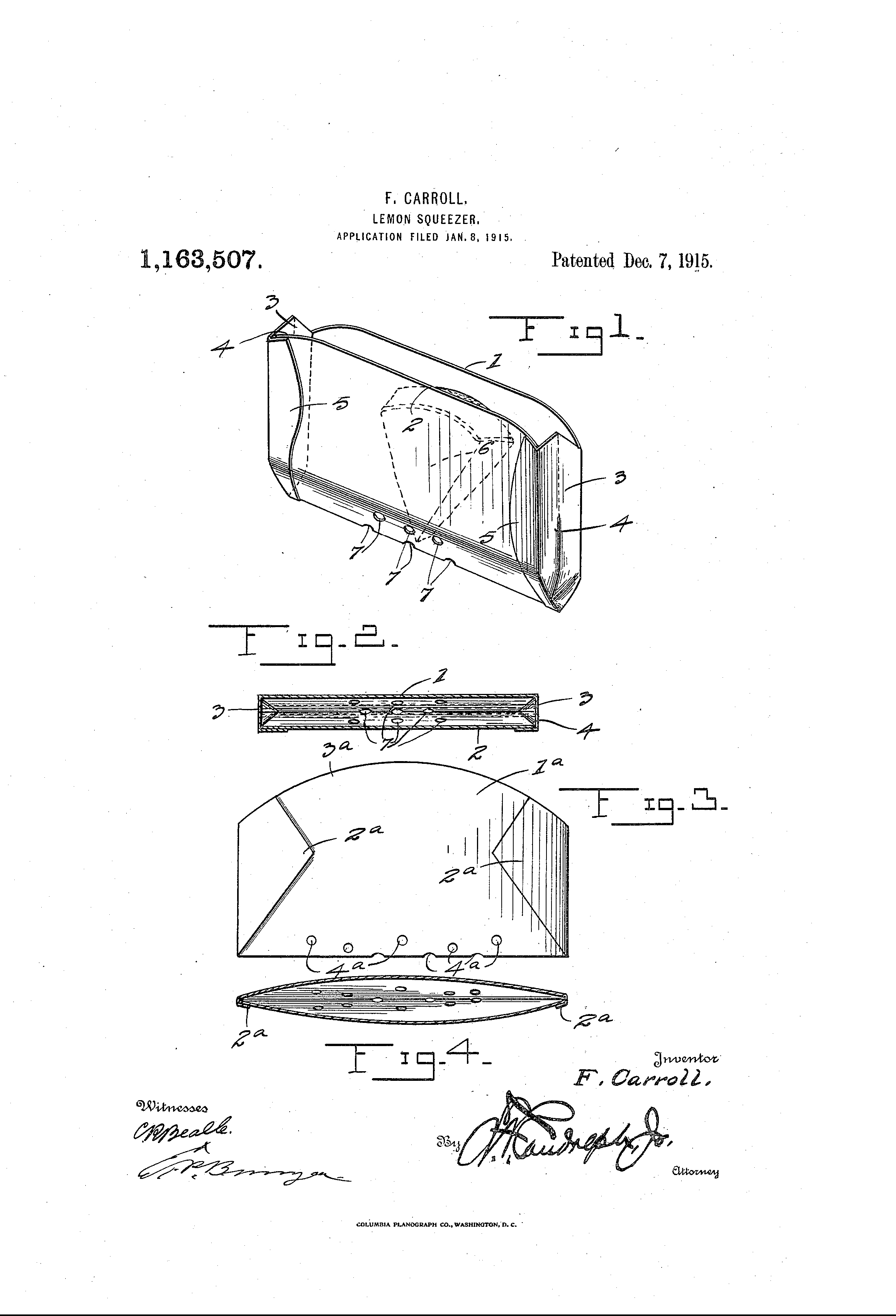
Carroll, 1915

== As decorative objects ==
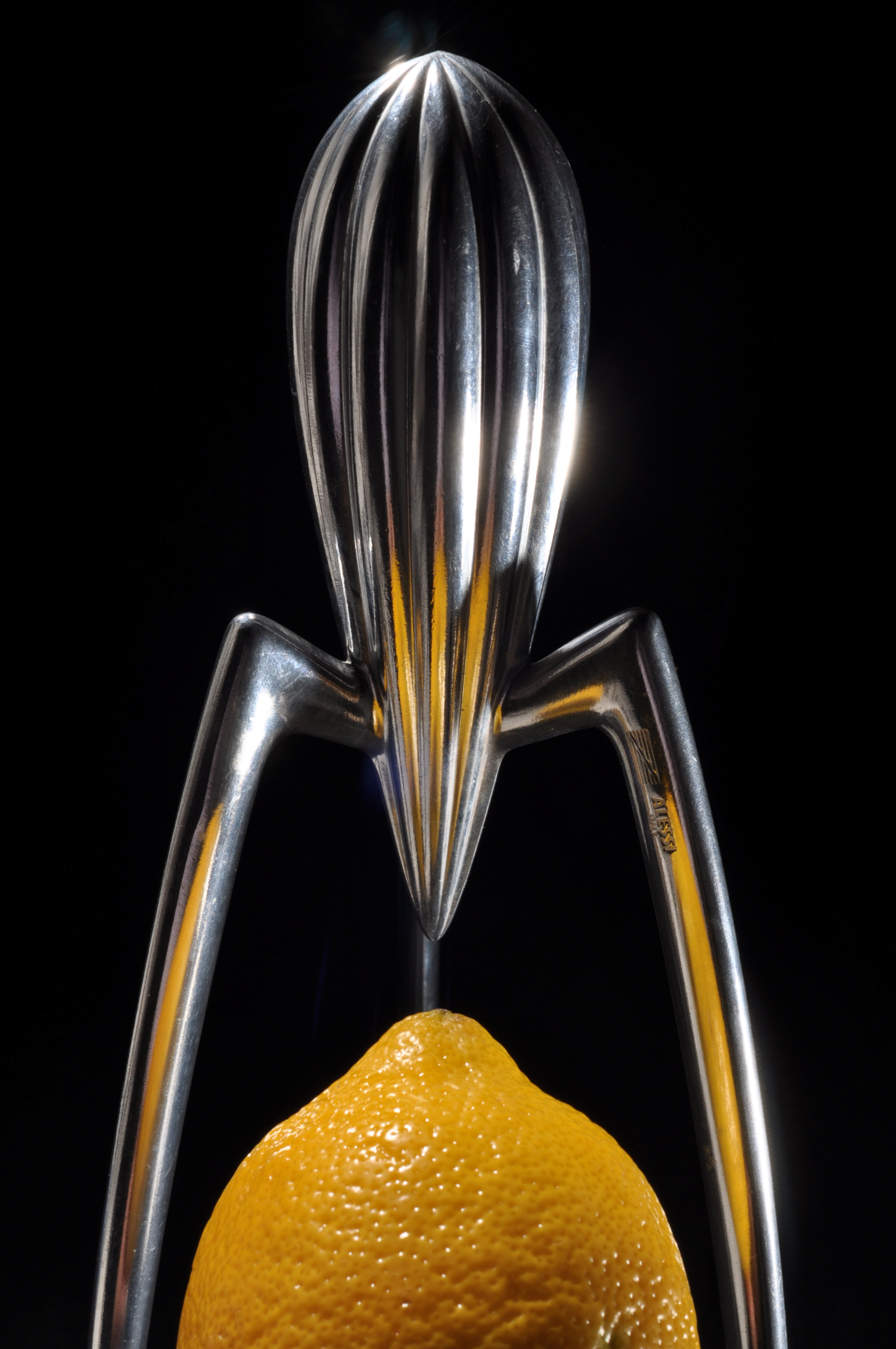
Philippe Starck's Juicy Salif squeezer (1990)

Not all squeezers are only meant to squeeze. Perhaps the most famous example of this is the Juicy Salif, designed by Philippe Starck in 1990. It is considered an icon of industrial design, and has been displayed in the Museum of Modern Art and the Metropolitan Museum of Art in New York. Manufactured by Italian kitchenware company Alessi and made from cast and polished aluminium, it is 14 centimetres (5.5 in) in diameter, and 29 cm (11 in) in hight. Large numbers have been sold, despite frequent criticisms that the kitchen tools do not work very well.

For the tenth anniversary of its launch, 10,000 Juicy Salifs were issued, individually numbered and gold-plated. The gold-plated version has been described as an "ornament" because citric acid would discolor and erode the gold plating. Starck has publicly stated that his squeezer was "not meant to squeeze lemons" but "to start conversations".

Other designers have also developed innovative citrus squeezers, which respond to new usage scenarios by considering the ergonomic aspects their products as important as aesthetics. In 2009, Joseph Joseph introduced the Catcher, a pestle squeezer that filters out seeds, designed by Graeme Davies. In 2011, the Dutch company Royal VKB introduced the Citrange, a playful double sided hand juicer which can be placed straight onto the glass, designed by the Belgian designer Quentin de Coster. In 2012, the Spanish brand Lékué launched its Citrus Spray, a juicer that works like a spray, designed by Papila Studio in collaboration with Joanrojeski.

== Traditions ==
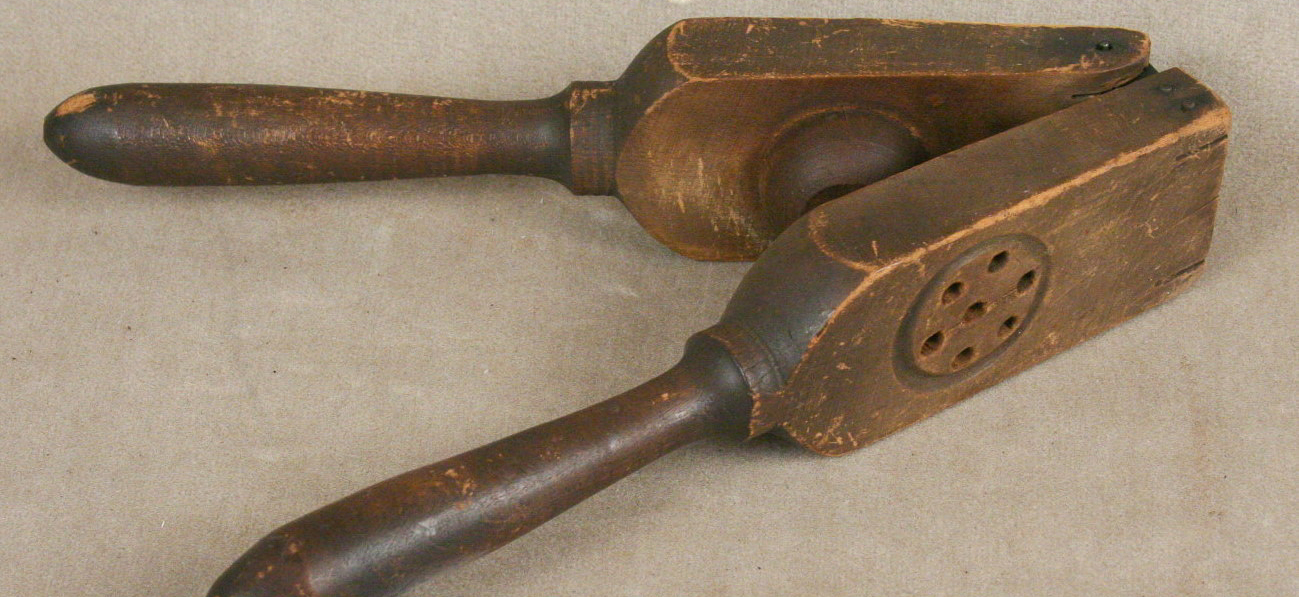
A wooden lemon squeezer, similar to that used at Trinity College

A wooden lemon squeezer has been passed down to students of Trinity College (Connecticut) since 1857. It was originally used to make punch, but William W. Niles, who later became the Bishop of the Episcopal Diocese of New Hampshire, established the tradition of handing down the lemon squeezer to the most popular rising class during Class Day. Soon afterward, rivalry built between classes and the lemon squeezer was stolen, replaced, and re-stolen multiple times, so that there are multiple allegedly original utensils circulating. The latest version of the lemon squeezer makes its only appearance during Convocation when the college president squeezes a fresh lemon to make a toast to the incoming class.

== See also ==
- Citrus reamer
