= Butter curler =

Kitchen tool used on butter

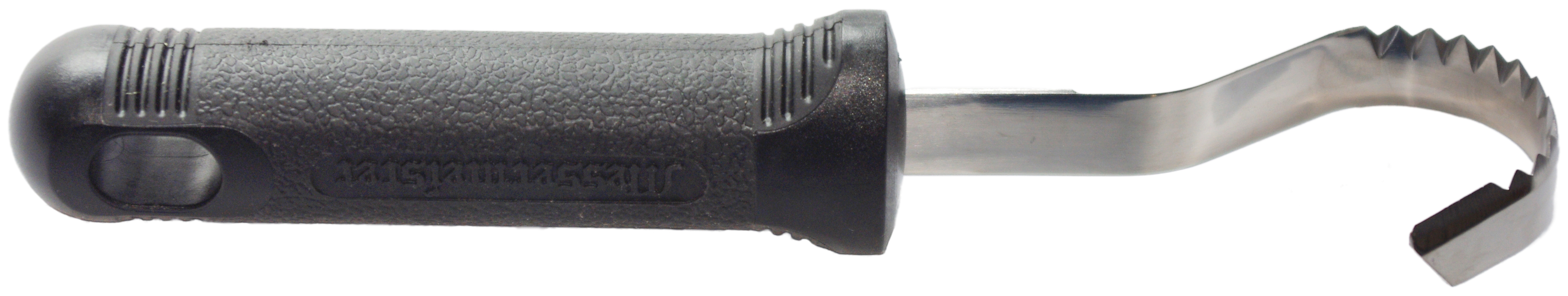
Butter curler

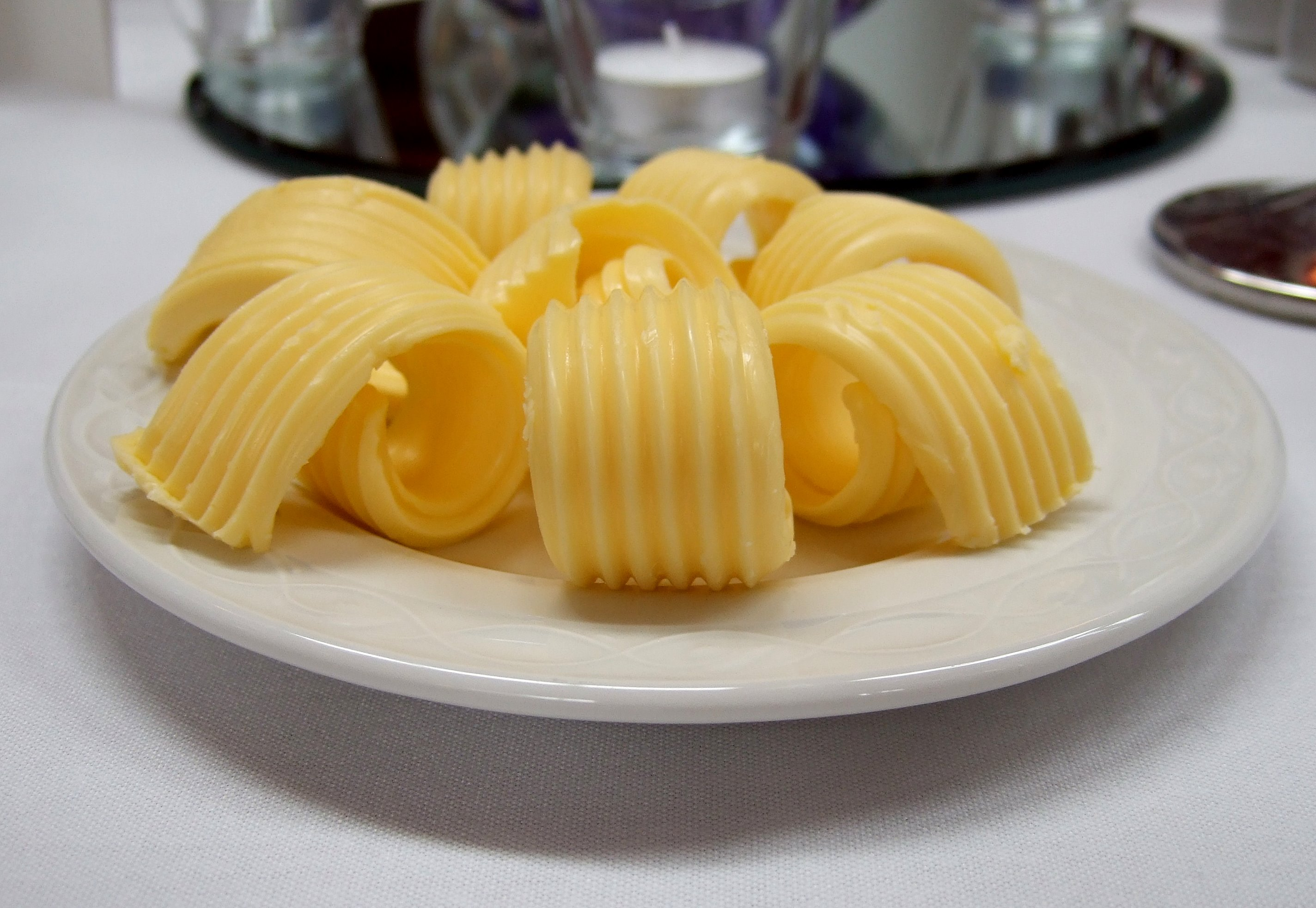
Butter curls created with a butter curler

A butter curler is a kitchen tool designed to produce decorative butter shapes for use in food decoration and also to hasten the softening of hard butter so it can be spread more easily. It can also be used to make chocolate and wax shavings. In typical use, the curler is dipped into hot water to ease the cutting.
