= Cake and pie server =

Serving utensil

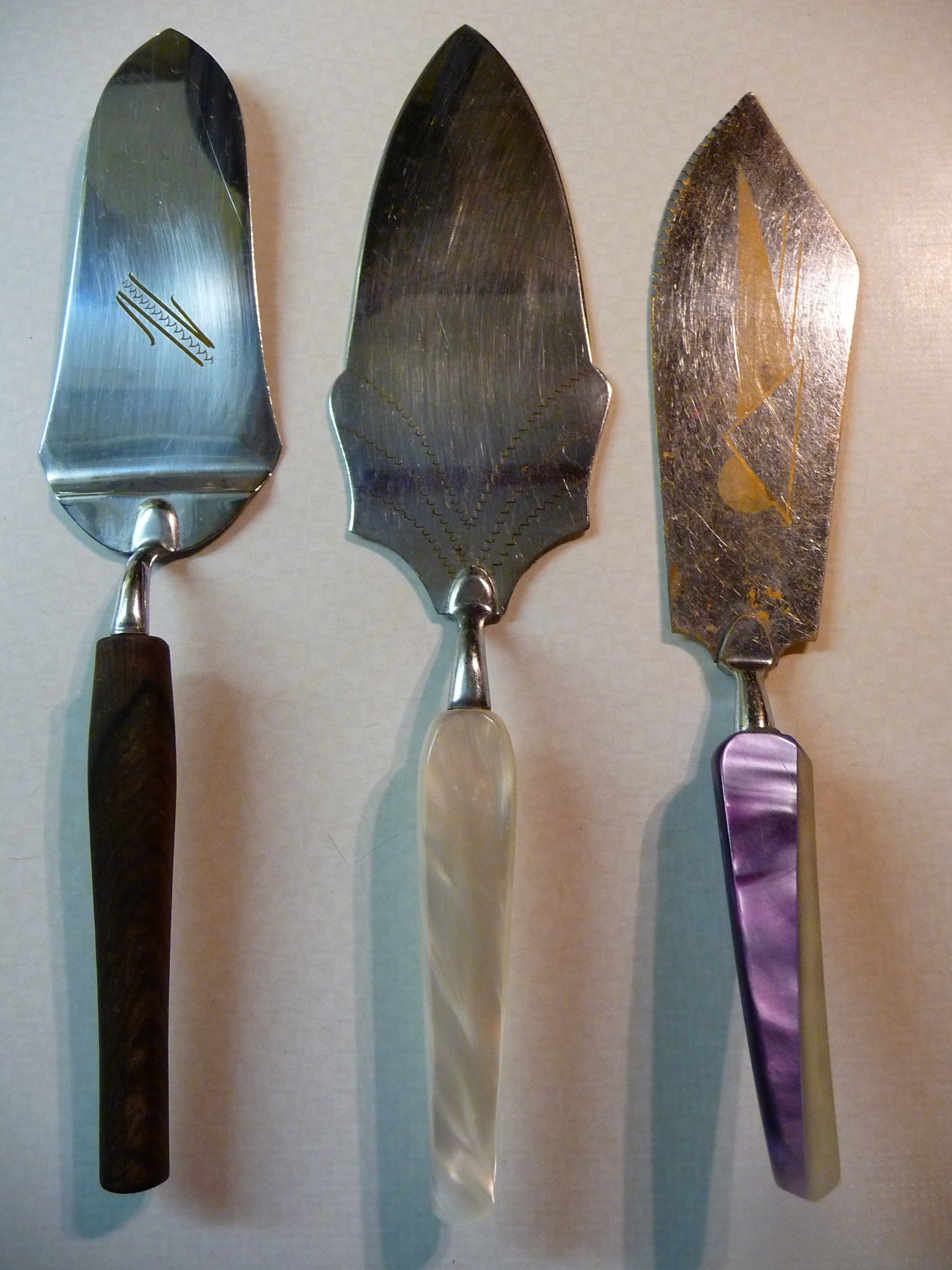
Various cake and pie servers

A cake and pie server, also called a cake shovel, pie shovel, pie knife, crêpe spade, quiche trowel, pie-getter, pie lifter, pie spatula, cake knife, or cake slice is a serving utensil used in the cutting and serving of pies and cakes. Some cake and pie servers have serrated edges. Another use for the utensil can be to serve pizza.

== See also ==
- List of serving utensils
- List of food preparation utensils
