= Sugar spoon =

Type of cutlery

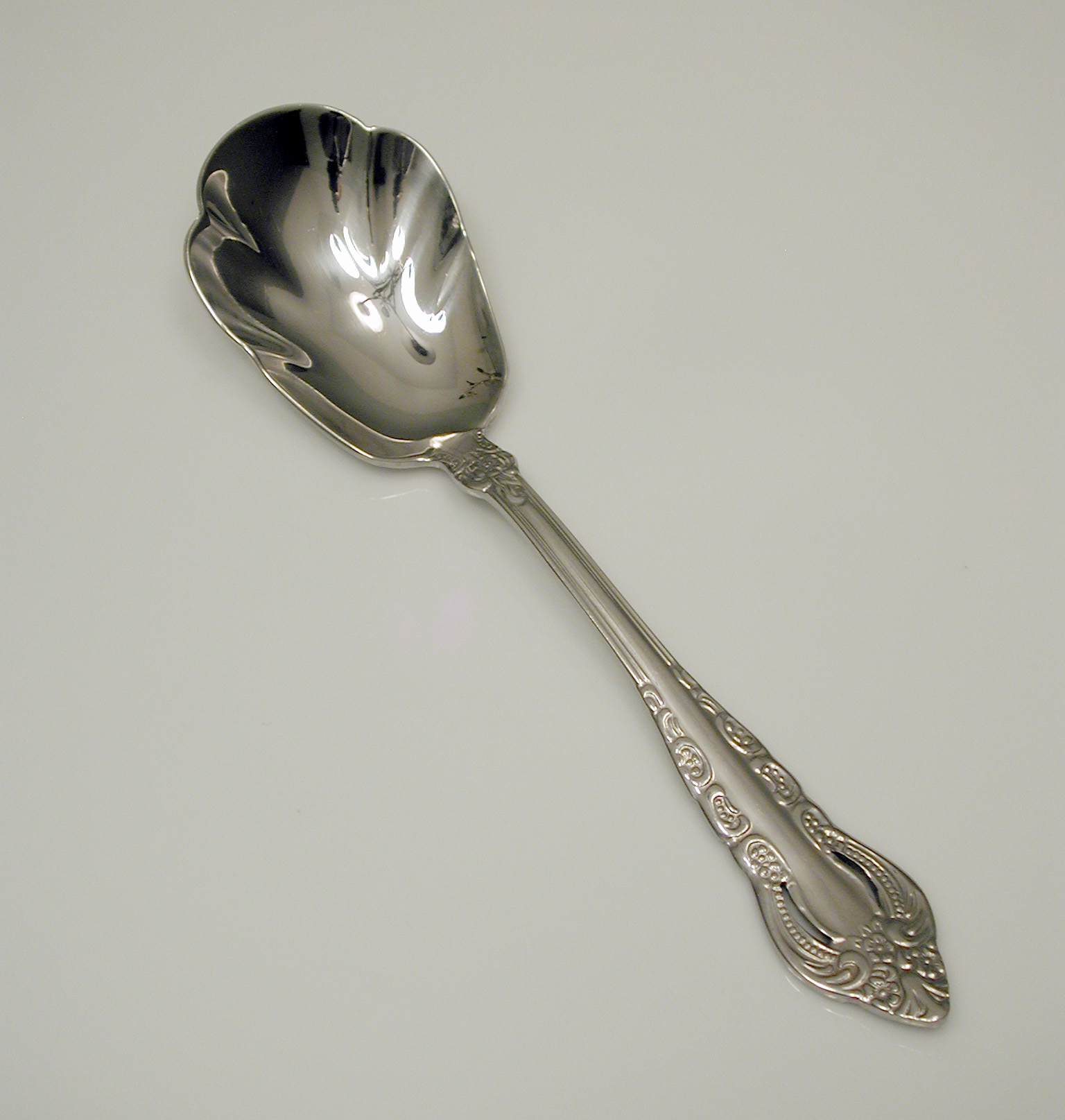
Sugar spoon

A sugar spoon is a piece of cutlery used for serving granulated sugar. This type of spoon resembles a teaspoon, except that the bowl is deeper and often molded in the shape of a sea shell, giving it the name sugar shell. Sugar spoons are sometimes called "sugar shovels" because of their rectangular shape and deep bowl. Sterling silver sugar spoons are used with formal silver coffee or tea sets.

== See also ==
- List of eating utensils
- List of serving utensils
- Table setting
