= Cookie press =

Device for making pressed cookies

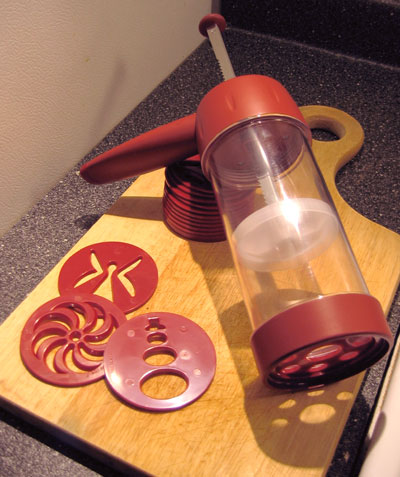
A cookie press with different plates

A cookie press, also known as a cookie gun, is a device for making pressed cookies such as spritz cookies. It consists of a cylinder with a plunger on one end, which is used to extrude cookie dough through a small hole at the other end. Typically the cookie press has interchangeable perforated plates with holes in different shapes, such as a star shape or a narrow slit to extrude the dough in ribbons.
