= Citrus reamer =

Utensil to extract juice from citrus fruit

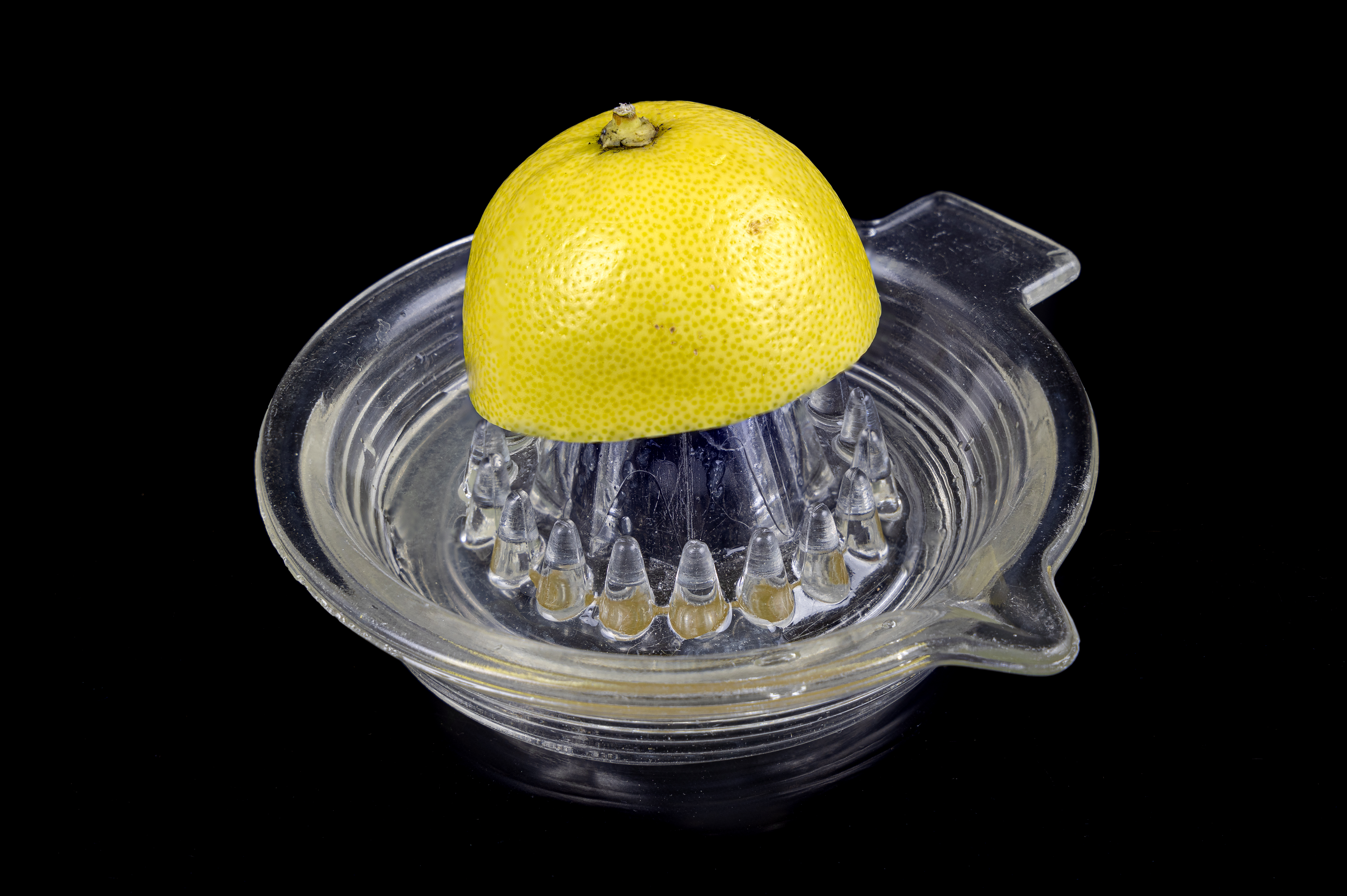
A traditional glass citrus reamer

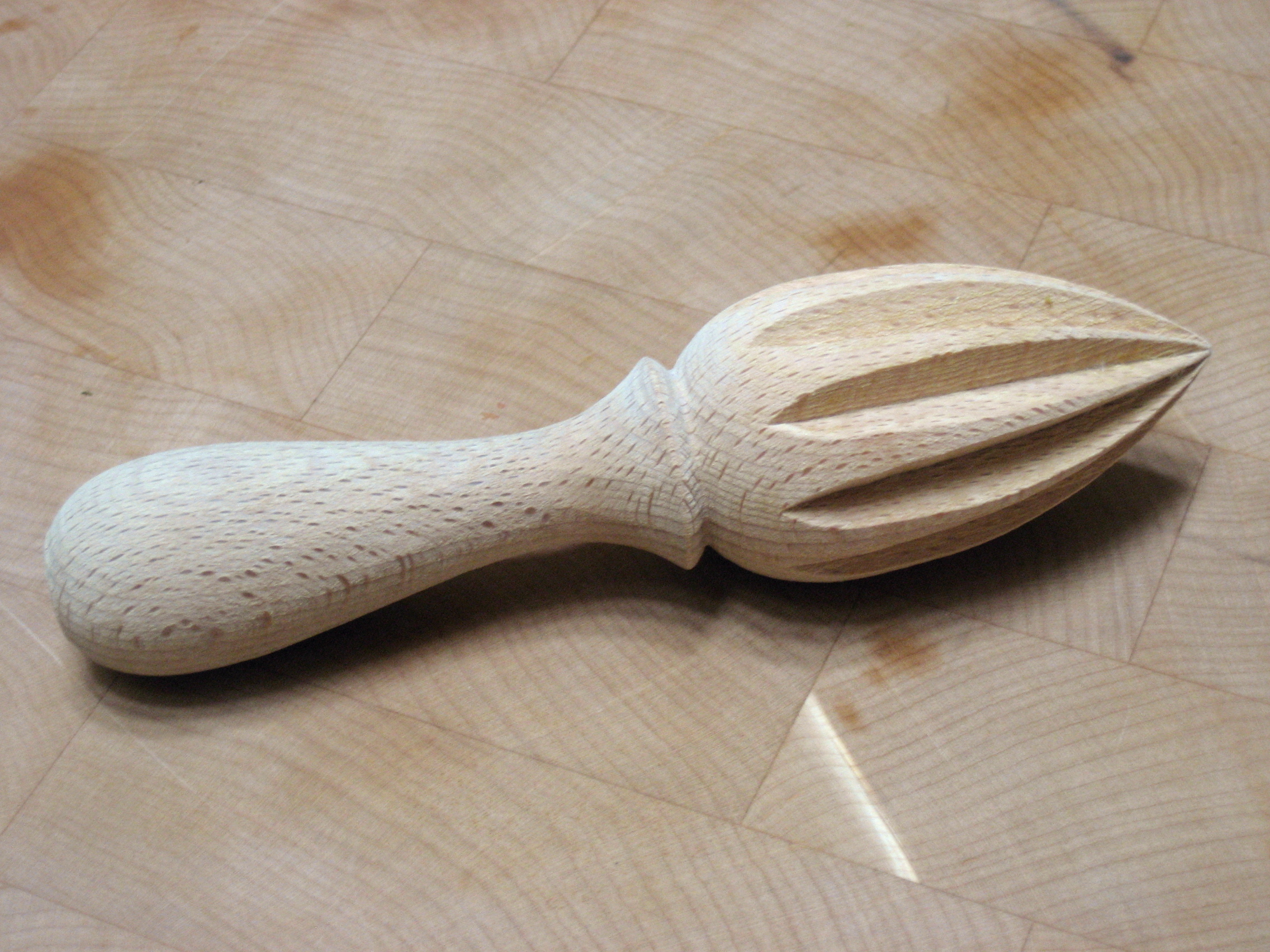
A wooden handheld lemon reamer

A citrus reamer, also known as a lemon reamer or simply a reamer, is a small kitchen utensil used to extract the juice from a lemon or other small citrus fruit.

The reamer extracts juice using a convexly tapered conical mandrel, with troughs or ridges running the length of the mandrel. The mandrel is mounted either within a dish to catch the juice or on a cylindrical handle. The mandrel is usually made of wood, plastic, or metal. The handheld reamer, which is held in one hand while the lemon or lime is held in the other, is a relatively new adaptation of the traditional glass or plastic citrus reamer (with a juice rim) that was placed on a table and pressed downward.

To use the reamer, the user first slices a citrus fruit in half along its equatorial midsection. The mandrel is inserted into the exposed flesh of the fruit and then either the reamer or the fruit is twisted to grind the flesh and extract the juice. This process dislodges the seeds and some amount of pith, so the juice must generally be strained before use, although some tabletop reamers include an integrated strainer. It works well with limes and lemons, but larger citrus fruits (grapefruit in particular) require a larger device.

== See also ==
- Lemon squeezer
- Reamer
- List of food preparation utensils
- Juicer
