= Milk watcher =

Cooking utensil

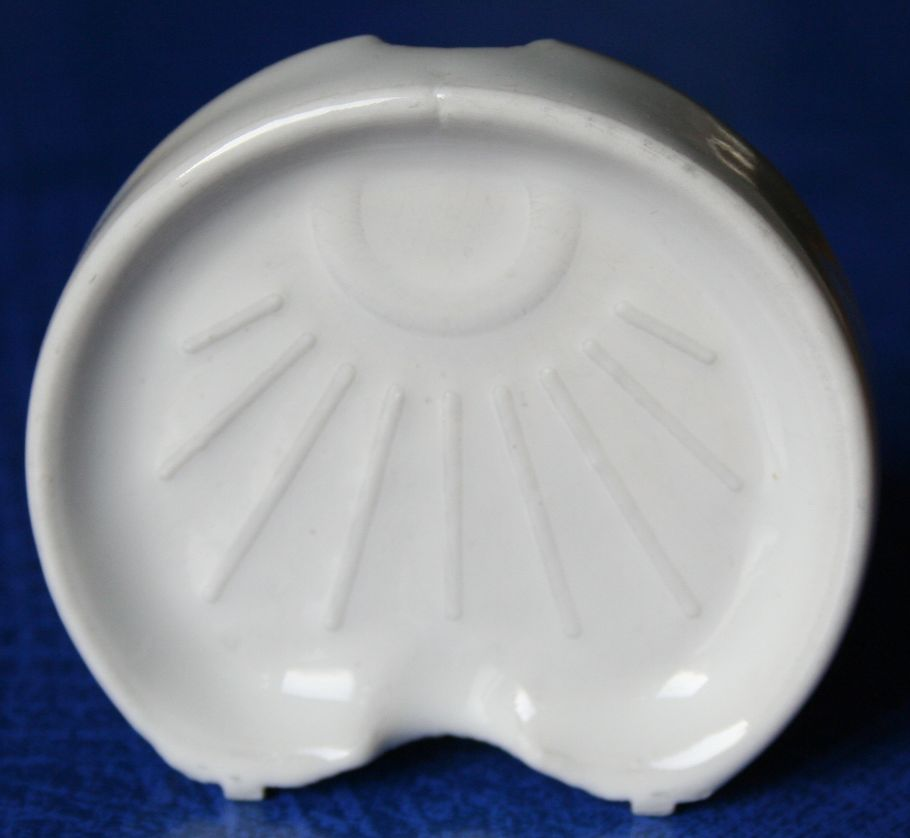
Porcelain milk watcher - notice that there is one notch on each side, and how the interior slants toward the notch

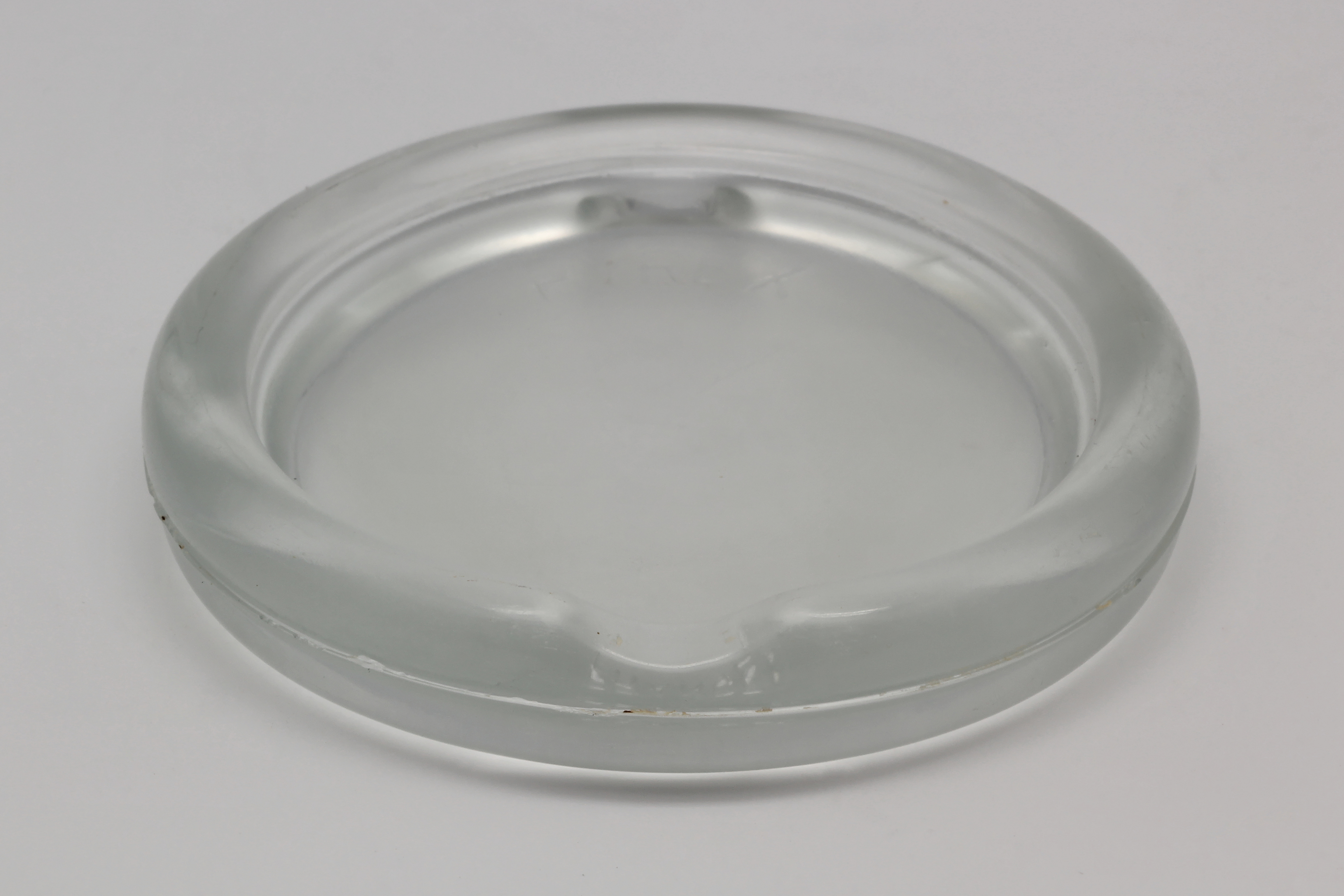
Glass milk watcher

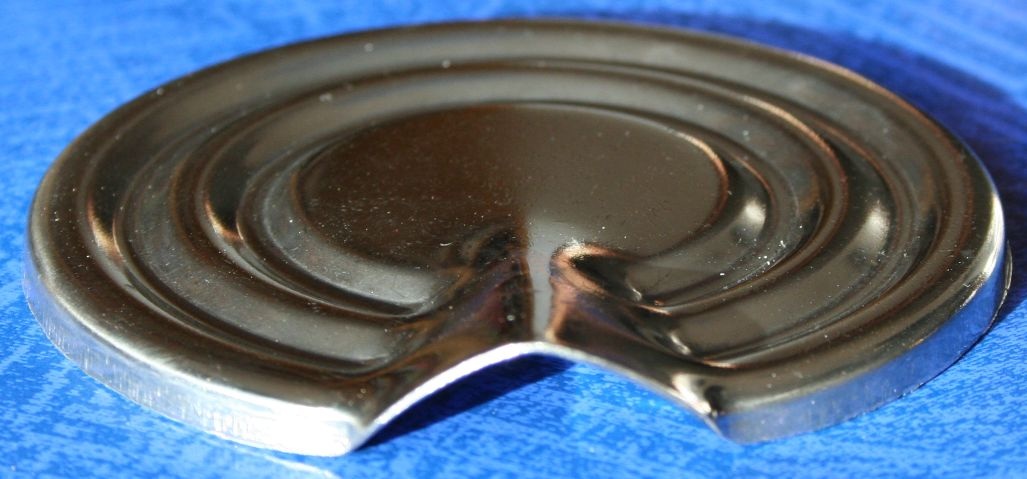
Stainless steel milk watcher

A milk watcher, milk saver, pot watcher, pot minder, milk guard, or boil over preventer is a cooking utensil placed at the bottom of a pot to prevent the foaming boil-over of liquids by collecting small bubbles of steam into one large bubble.

== Description ==
A milk watcher is a disk with a raised rim notched on one side. Some milk savers are designed so they can be used with the obverse or reverse side facing up and appear to have two notches. The interior of the disk slants upward toward the notched side, creating a space just behind the notch where water vapor can collect. Water vapor trapped under the milk saver causes the notched side to rise up, releasing the water vapor and making a rattling noise as the saver falls back into contact with the base of the pan.

== Explanation ==
Normally, boiling water does not boil over. When fats, starches, and some other substances are present in boiling water, for example by adding milk or pasta, boiling over can occur. A film forms on the surface of the boiling liquid; for example, cream can boil over as milk fat separates from the milk. The increased viscosity of the liquid causes the steam bubbles to form foam trapped under the film, pushing the film up and over the lip of the pot, boiling over. A milk watcher disrupts this process by collecting small bubbles of steam into one large bubble and releasing it in a manner which may puncture the surface film. The device also rattles when boiling occurs, alerting the cook who may then lower the heat setting of the stove.

By circulating fluid around the bottom of the pot the device may also prevent material from being deposited and eventually burned on the pot's bottom.

== History ==
The milk watcher was invented by I. F. Ivankovitser in 1921; a patent was obtained in 1929. It was improved by Vincent Hartley in 1938.
