= Apple corer =

Device for removing core and pips from an apple

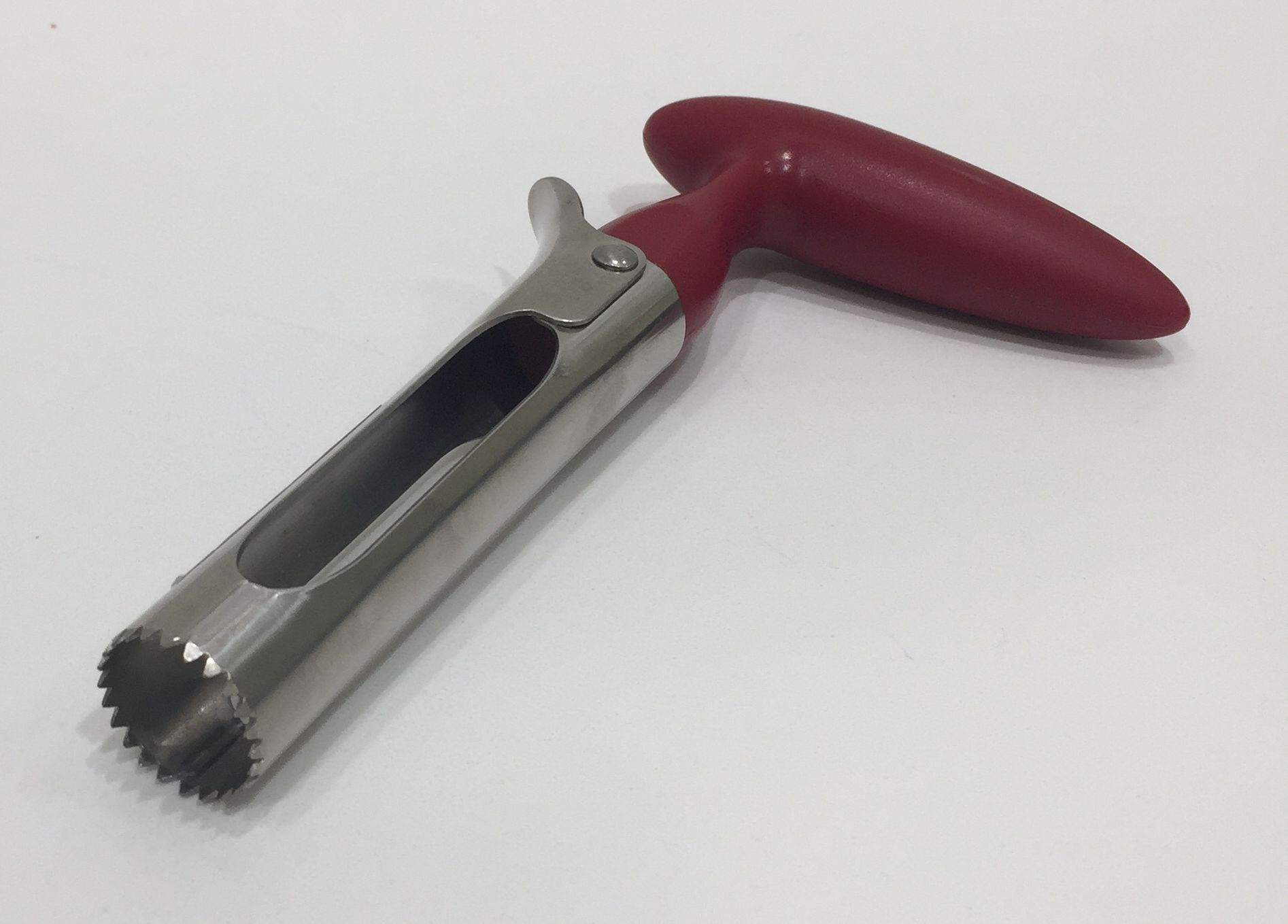
A modern apple corer

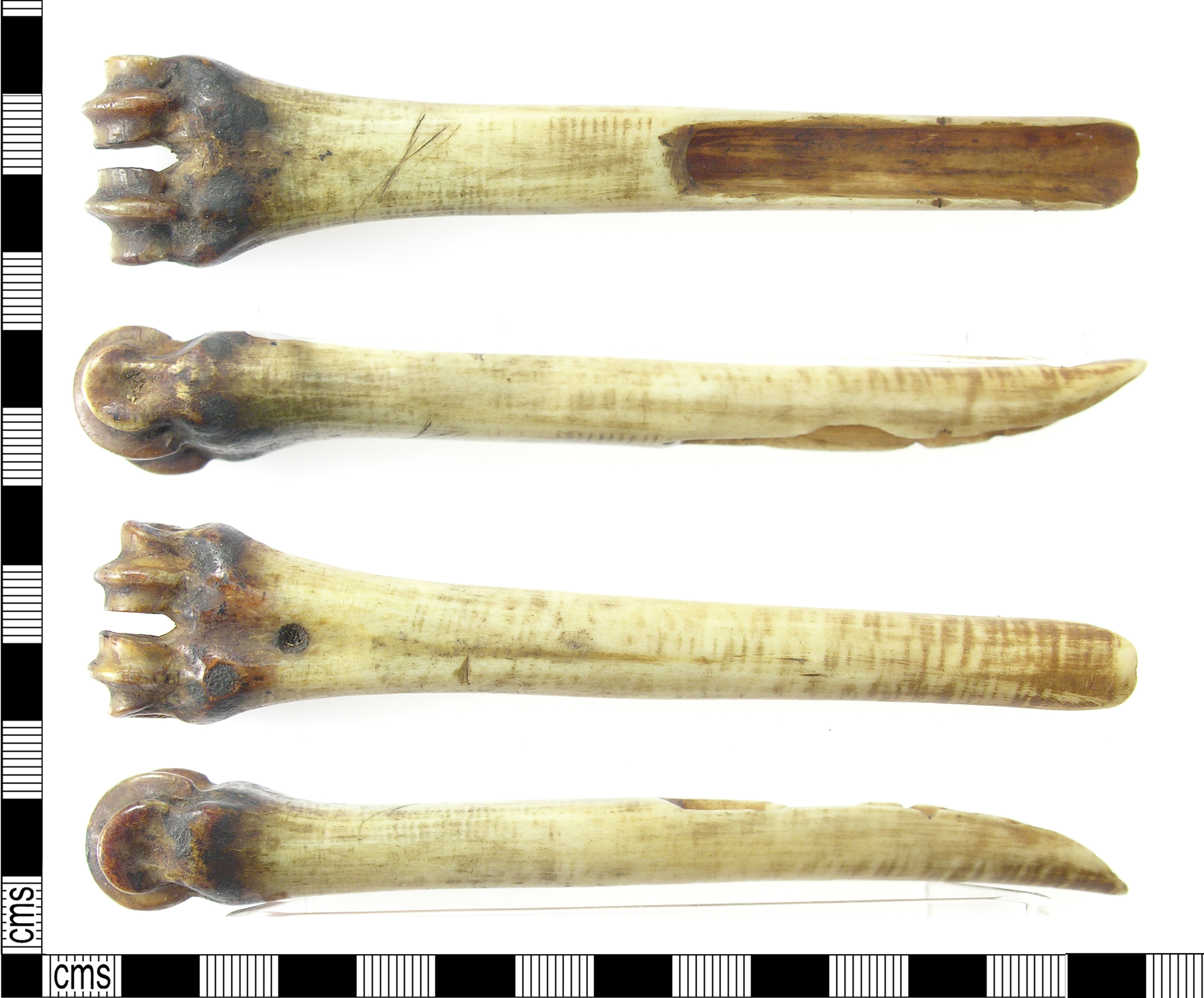
A 1700s apple corer made from a cannonbone

An apple corer is a device for removing the core and pips from an apple. It may also be used for similar fruits, such as pears or quince. An apple corer is often used when apples need to be kept whole—for example, when making baked apples —or when a large number of apples need to be cored and sliced, such as when preparing an apple pie or similar dessert.

Some apple corers consist of a handle with a circular cutting device at the end. When pushed through the apple, it removes the core to the diameter of the circular cutting device. The core can then be removed from the apple corer. Another type of apple corer can be placed on top of the apple and pushed through, which both cores and slices the apple. This type is also commonly referred to as an apple cutter or apple slicer.

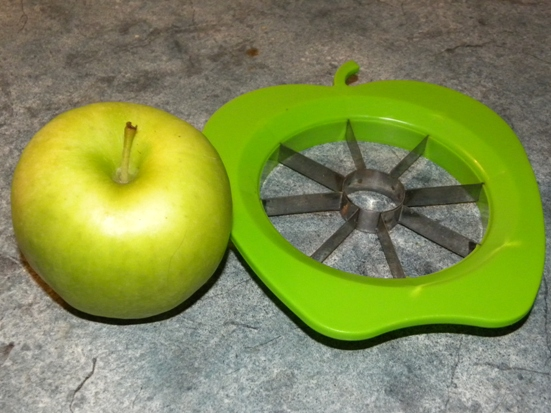
An apple cutter, with a corer and slicer
