= Grapefruit spoon =

Kind of spoon intended for use with citrus fruit

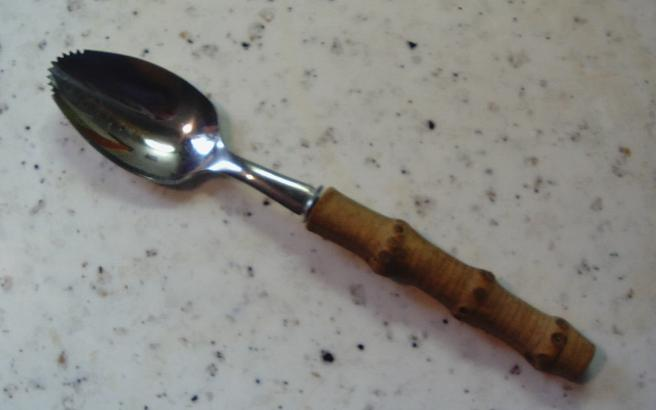
Note the serrated tip of the spoon.

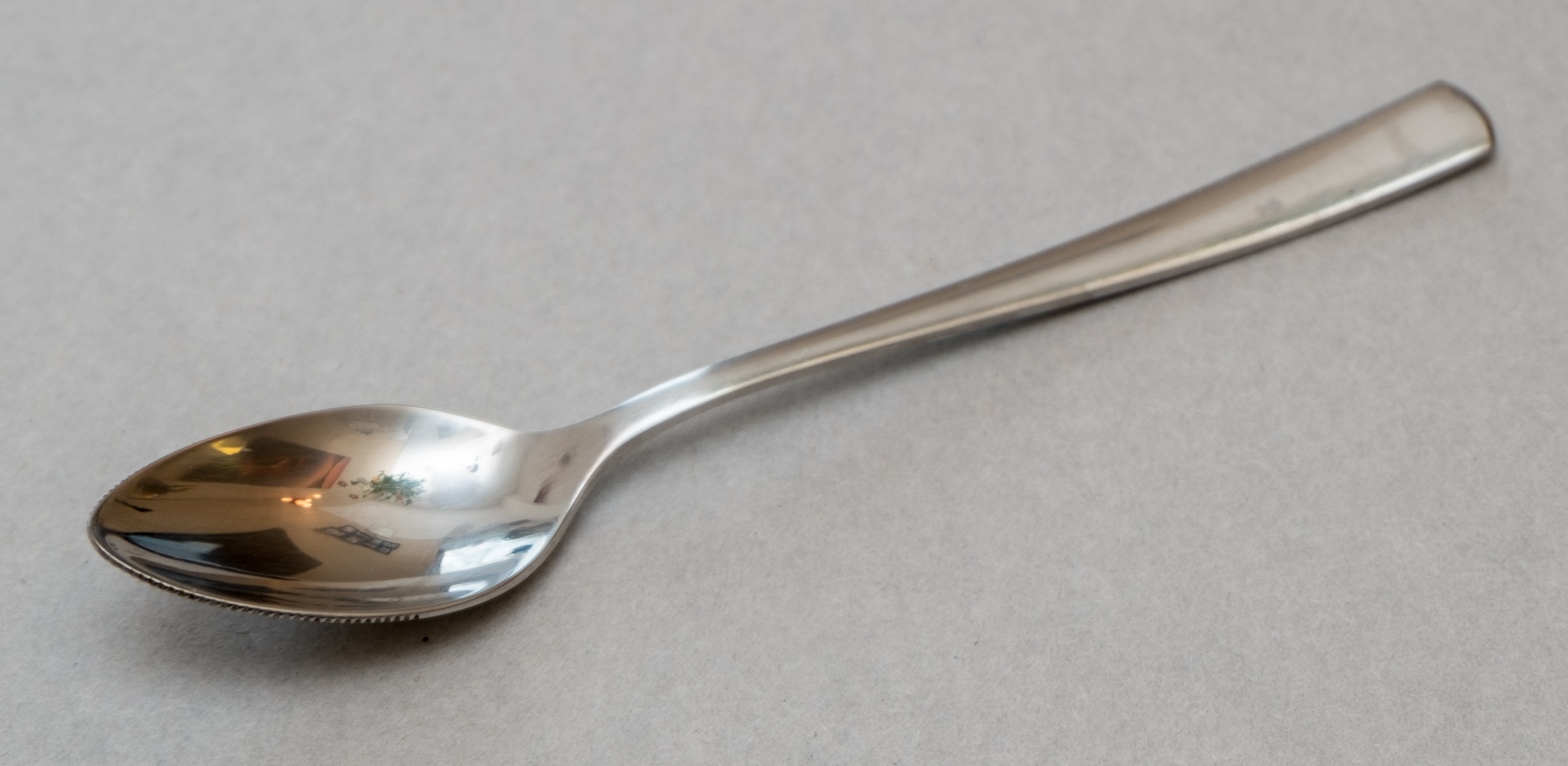
Kitchen utensil with special tip for kiwifruits or melons

A grapefruit spoon is a utensil usually similar in design to a teaspoon that tapers to a sharp edge or teeth, the intent of the front serration being to separate the flesh of a grapefruit from its rind. Also called an orange spoon, citrus spoon, and fruit spoon, it is used for other citrus fruits, as well as kiwifruit and melons.

A variation of the design has a blunt front edge with serrated sides, enabling the user to dig the spoon into the fruit before using the serrated side edges as a knife to separate the flesh from the rind.

These spoons are not generally found in most cutlery sets but may be purchased separately.

== See also ==
- Grapefruit knife
- Spife
- Spork
- Splayd
- List of types of spoons
