= Spritzgebäck =

Type of biscuit

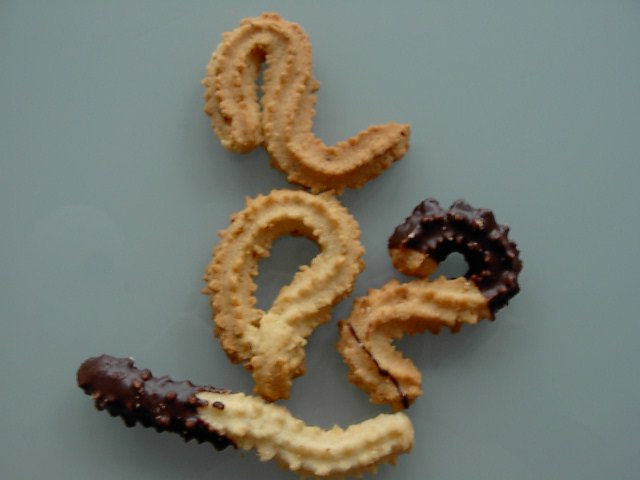
- Type: Biscuit / Cookie
- Place of origin: Germany, France (Alsace and Moselle)
- Main ingredients: flour, butter, sugar, eggs

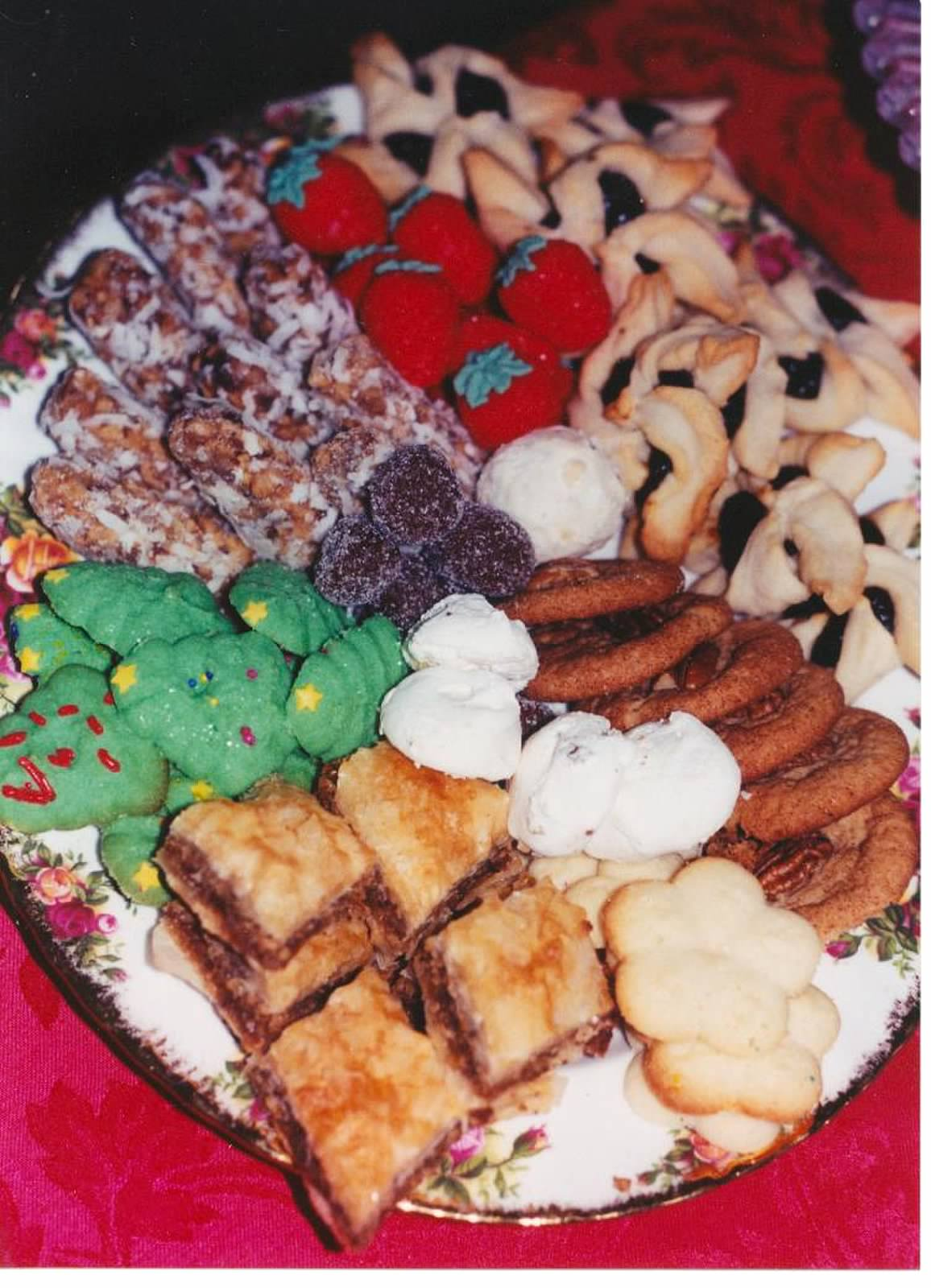
Traditional holiday cookie plate with green tree-shaped spritz

Spritzgebäck (German: [ˈʃpʁɪtsɡəˌbɛk]), also called a spritz cookie in the United States, is a type of biscuit or cookie of German and Alsatian-Mosellan origin made of a rich shortcrust pastry. When made correctly, the cookies are crisp, fragile, somewhat dry, and buttery.

The German root verb spritzen (German: [ˈʃpʁɪtsn̩]) is cognate with the English spurt. As the name implies, these cookies are made by squeezing, or "spritzing", the dough through a cookie press fitted with patterned holes (or extruded through a cake decorator or pastry forcing bag to which a variety of nozzles may be fitted).

== See also ==
- List of German desserts
