= Grapefruit knife =

Knife designed for cutting grapefruit

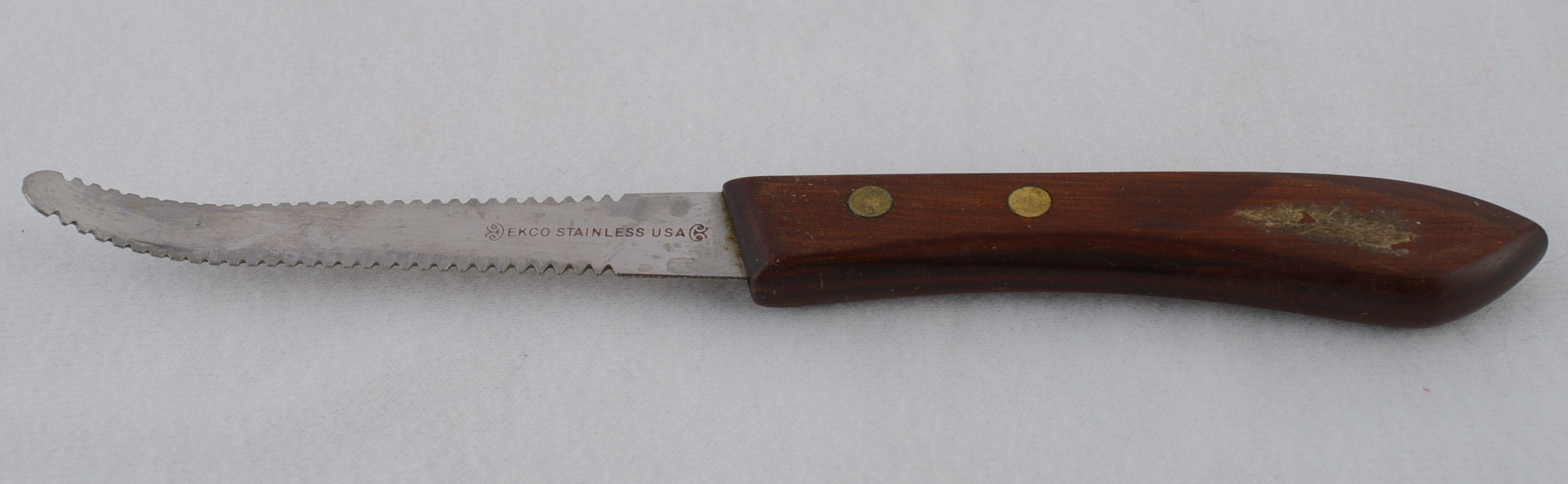
A grapefruit knife with a wooden handle

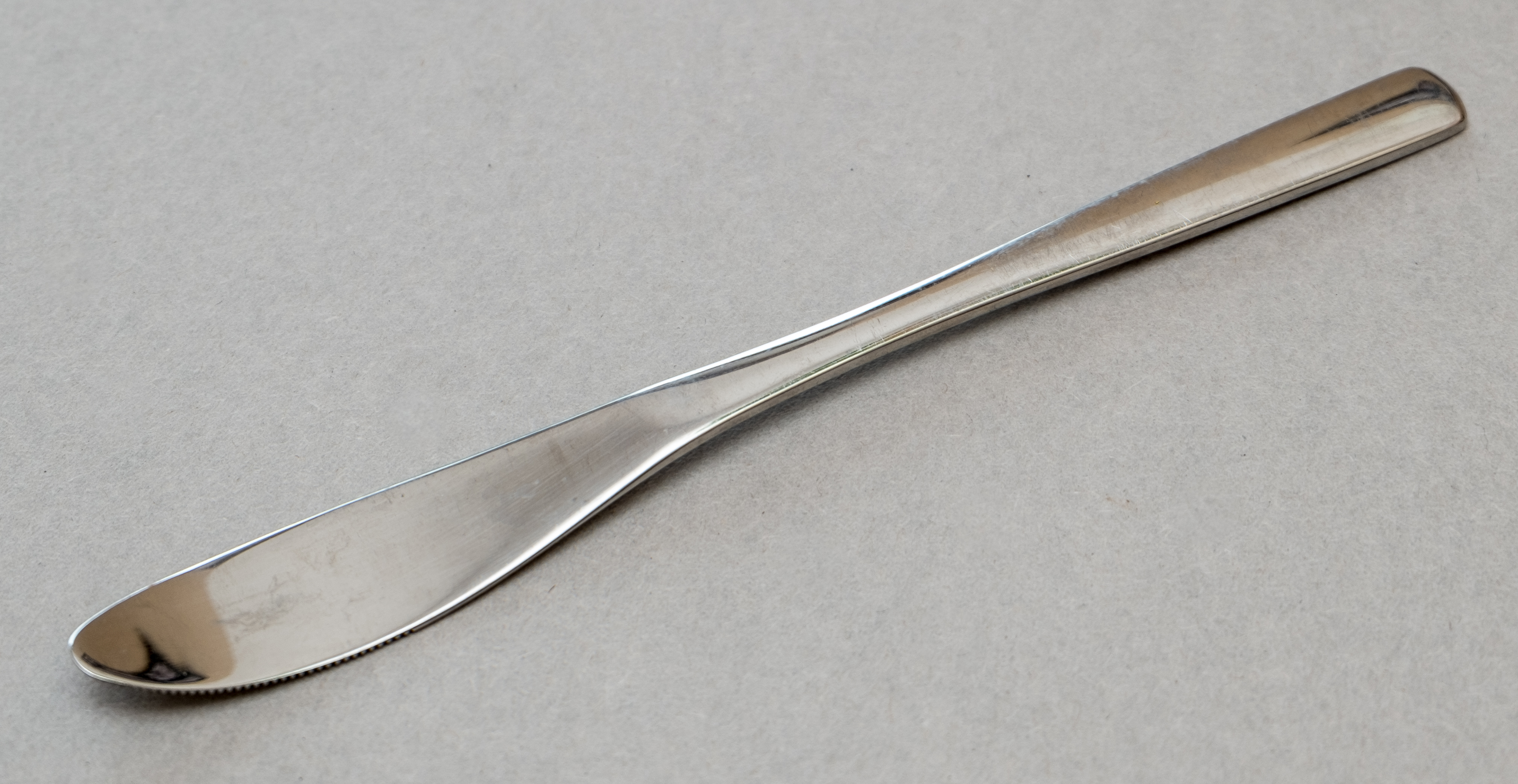
Modern grapefruit knife

A grapefruit knife is a special type of knife designed specifically for cutting grapefruit. Grapefruit knives are small with a curved serrated blade, designed to hug the curves of the grapefruit. This is used to separate the outer edge of the segments from the rim of the fruit. The term "grapefruit knife" can refer to a type of knife with short, serrated twin blades about 2 mm apart, used to separate the sides of each section from the dividing membrane. Some grapefruit knives incorporate both types, a double-sided curved blade on one side and the parallel twin blades on the other. Another type includes an angled tip and double-sided serrated blade. When both types are used, the result is an intact-looking fruit with sections which lift out easily—especially if a "grapefruit spoon" is used.

In the 1950 film noir movie In a Lonely Place, Humphrey Bogart's character straightens out a grapefruit knife, unaware of the purpose of its design.

== English law ==
A legal case in the English Criminal Courts has held that a grapefruit knife is, in fact, a knife. It is illegal under the Criminal Justice Act 1988 to sell knives to persons under 18. Trading Standards officers of the Royal Borough of Windsor and Maidenhead brought charges in East Berkshire Magistrates' Court against W J Daniel and Company Limited, one of whose employees had sold a grapefruit knife to a test purchaser under the age of 16 on 17 February 2009. The magistrates were persuaded that it was not, in fact, a knife but a "gadget" and duly dismissed the case. At an appeal in the High Court, Sir Anthony May found that this was wrong. Using the definition of "knife" in the Oxford English Dictionary ("A cutting instrument consisting of a blade with a sharpened longitudinal edge fixed in a handle either rigidly, as in a table knife, carving or sheath knife, or with a joint, as in a pocket or clasp knife. The blade is generally of steel, but sometimes of other material, as in the silver fish and fruit knives, the blunt edged paper knife of ivory, wood, etcetera, and the flint knives of early man.") which, he said, accorded with his own understanding, he ruled that a grapefruit knife was indeed a knife within the meaning of the Act and upheld the appeal. The case was remitted to the magistrates to continue the hearing.

== See also ==
- Grapefruit spoon – Kind of spoon intended for use with citrus fruit
- Spork – Item of cutlery combining a spoon and fork
