= List of eating utensils =

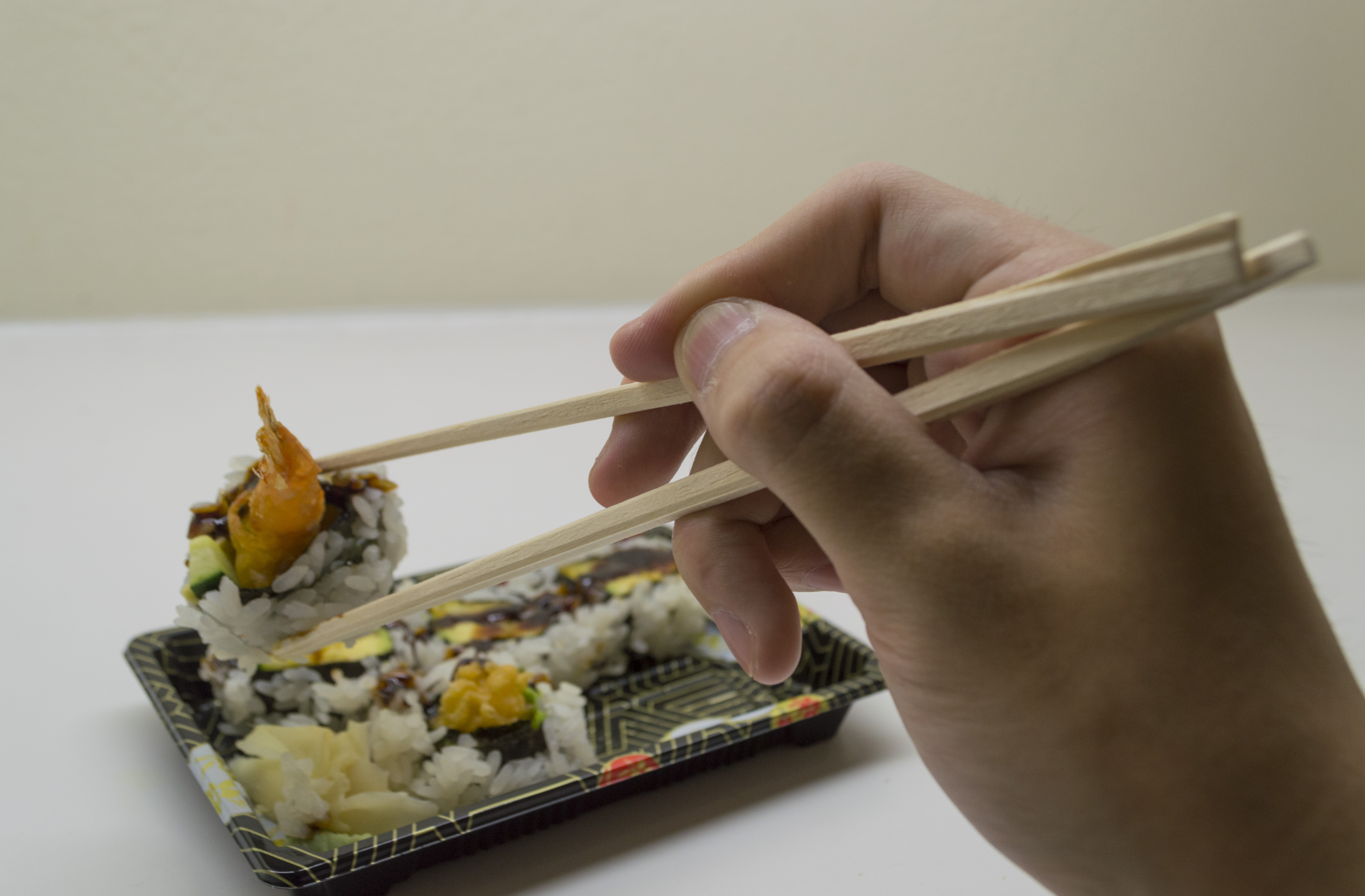
Wooden chopsticks

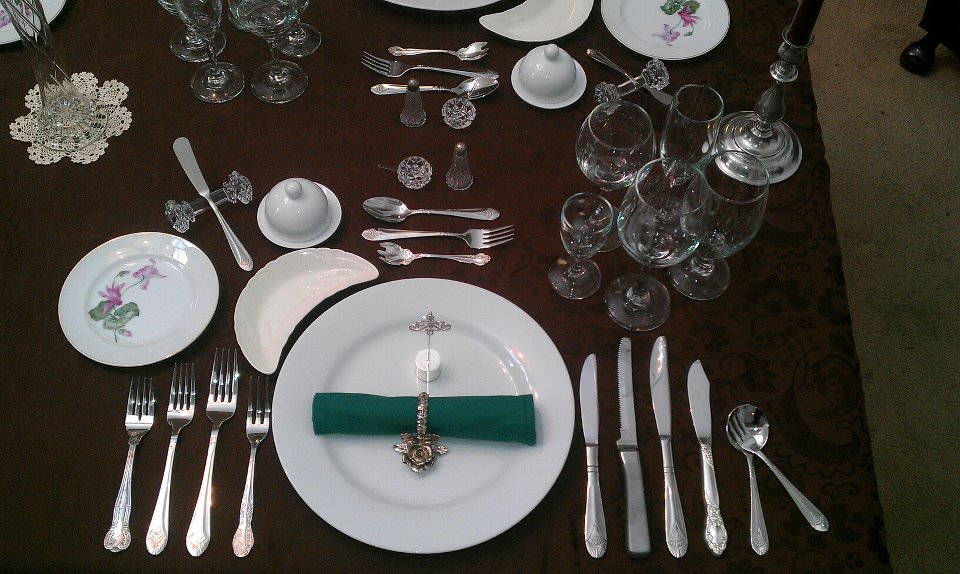
A Western-style, formal place setting. It includes a butter spreader resting on a crystal stand; a cocktail fork, soup spoon, dessert fork, dessert spoon and an ice cream fork, as well as separate knives and forks for fish, entrée, main course and salad.

A variety of eating utensils have been used by people to aid eating when dining. Most societies traditionally use bowls or dishes to contain food to be eaten, but while some use their hands to deliver this food to their mouths, others have developed specific tools for the purpose. In Western cultures, cutlery items such as knives and forks are the traditional norm, while in much of the East, chopsticks are more common. Spoons are ubiquitous.

== History ==
In some cultures, such as Ethiopian and Indian, hands alone are used or bread takes the place of eating utensils. In others, such as Japanese and Chinese, where bowls of food are more often raised to the mouth, little modification from the basic pair of chopsticks and a spoon has taken place. Western culture has taken the development and specialization of eating utensils further, with the result that multiple utensils may appear in a dining setting, each with a different name and purpose. With the evolution of people's eating habits, further modification continues to take place, mostly in the West.

== List of utensil types ==
- Spoon / Tablespoon – List of types of spoons
- Fork – Western/Southeast Asian utensils
- Knife
- Chopsticks – East and Southeast Asian utensil
- Skewer
- Tongs
- Toothpick / Cocktail stick
- Drinking straw
- Food pusher - a utensil with a blade set at 90° to the handle, used for pushing food onto a spoon or fork

=== Utensils for specific foods ===
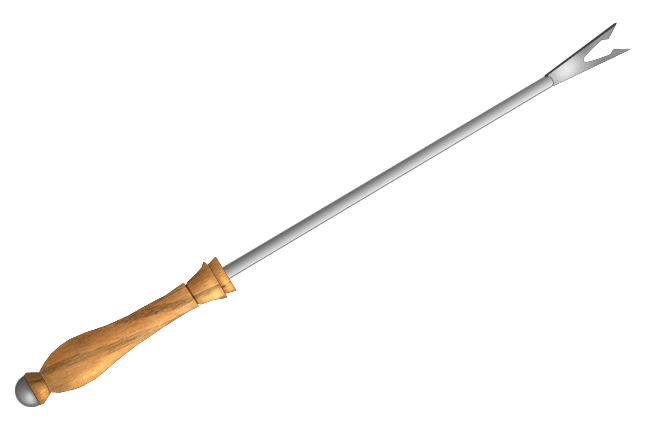
A fondue fork

Some utensils are designed for eating or preparing specific foods:

- Butter knife
- Cake fork
- Soup spoon
- Crab cracker
- Crab fork
- Corn cob holders
- Fish knife
- Fondue fork
- Grapefruit knife
- Grapefruit spoon
- Lobster pick
- Snail tongs and forks
- Nutcracker
- Ice cream scoop
- Steak knife
- Tongs for:
  - Sugar (Sugar tongs)
  - Asparagus
- Honey dipper
- Meat claws (used to shred barbecue meats such as brisket)

=== Combination utensils ===
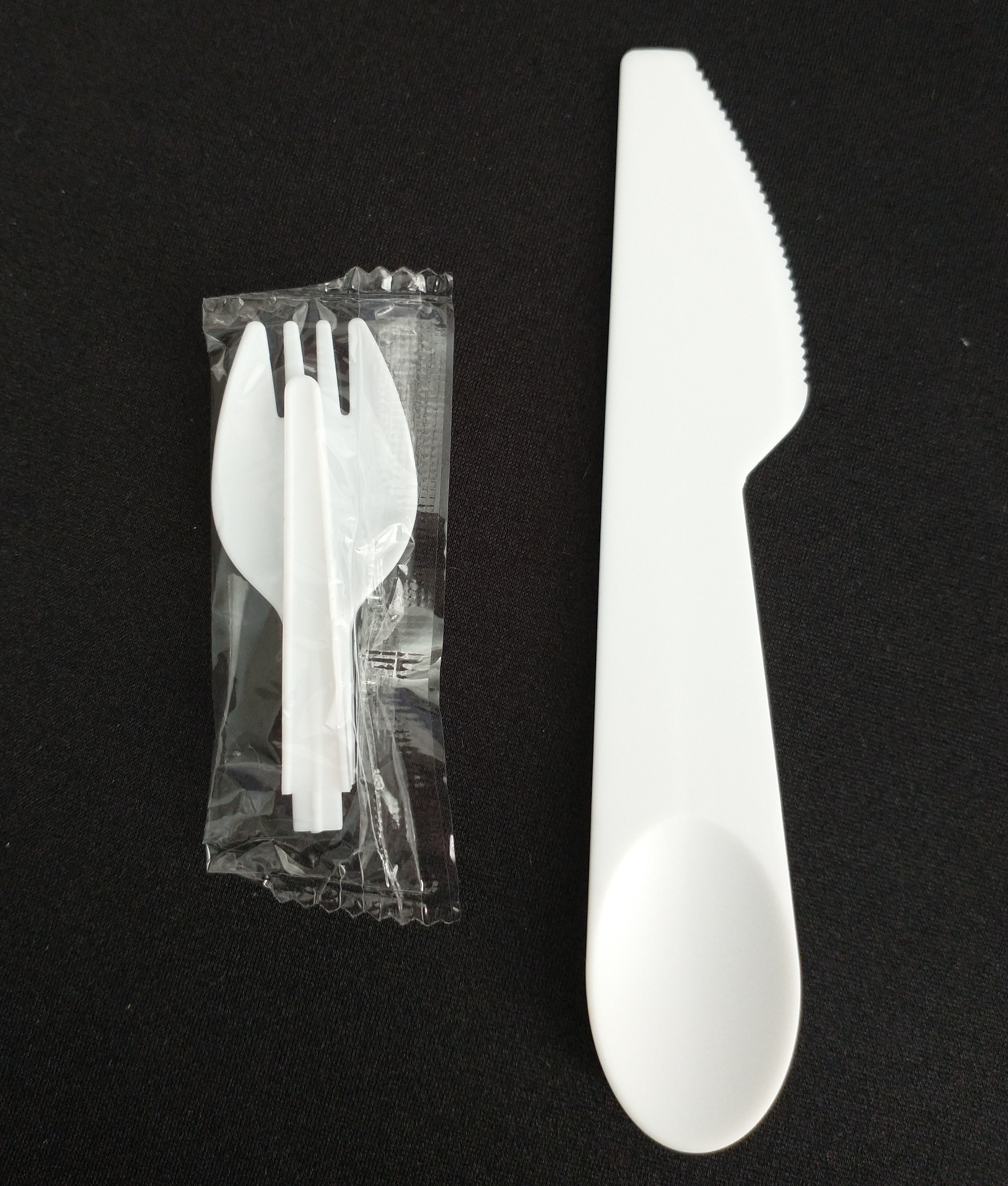
A spork – spoon and fork – in packaging, on the left, and a spife – spoon and knife – on the right

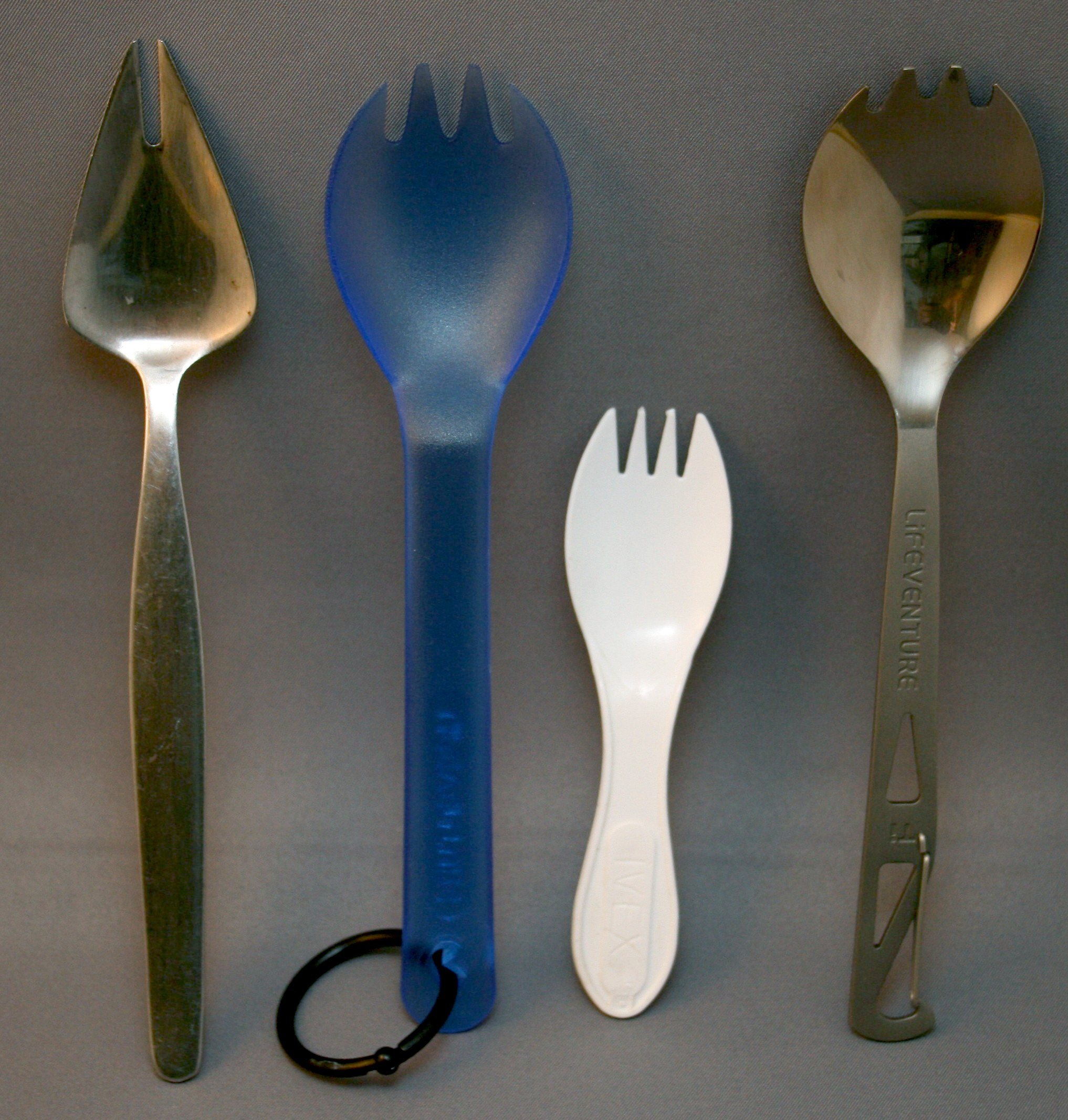
Four types of spork

Over time, traditional utensils have been modified in various ways in attempts to make eating more convenient or to reduce the total number of utensils required. These are typically called combination utensils.

- Chopfork – A utensil with a fork at one end and chopsticks/tongs at the other.
- Chork – Pointed and slightly curved tongs, which can be used like chopsticks (as pincers) or as a fork (for spearing). A different kind of chork is a fork with a split handle, which can be broken in half to make two chopsticks.
- Forkchops – Used in a pair, these are basically a pair of chopsticks with a small fork and knife on the non-pointed ends.
- Spoon and chopstick hybrid – Pointed and slightly curved tongs, which can be used like chopsticks or as a spoon.
- Knife and chopstick hybrid – Pointed and slightly curved tongs, which can be used like chopsticks or as a knife.
- Knork – A knife with a single tine, sharpened or serrated, set into the anterior end of the blade.
- Pastry fork – A fork with a cutting edge along one of the tines.
- Spifork - A utensil consisting of a spoon, knife, and fork.
- Spoon straw – A scoop-ended drinking straw intended for slushies and milkshakes.
- Sporf – A utensil consisting of a spoon on one end, a fork on the other, and edge tines that are sharpened or serrated.
- Spork – Spoon and fork
- Splayd – Spoon and fork and knife
- Spife – Spoon and knife.
- FRED - Can opener, bottle opener, and spoon combination issued by the Australian Defence Force.

=== Disposable utensils ===
Prepackaged products may come with a utensil intended to be consumed or discarded after using it to consume the product. For instance, some single-serve ice cream have been sold with a flat wooden spade, often erroneously called a "spoon", to lift the product to one's mouth. Prepackaged tuna salad or cracker snacks may contain a flat plastic spade for similar purposes.

== See also ==
- Tableware – Items used for setting a table and serving food
- Drinkware
- Edible tableware – Utensil made of food or which can be eaten
- Eating utensil etiquette – Social conventions of cutlery usage
- List of food preparation utensils
- List of serving utensils
- Combination eating utensils
