= Toasting fork =

Utensil

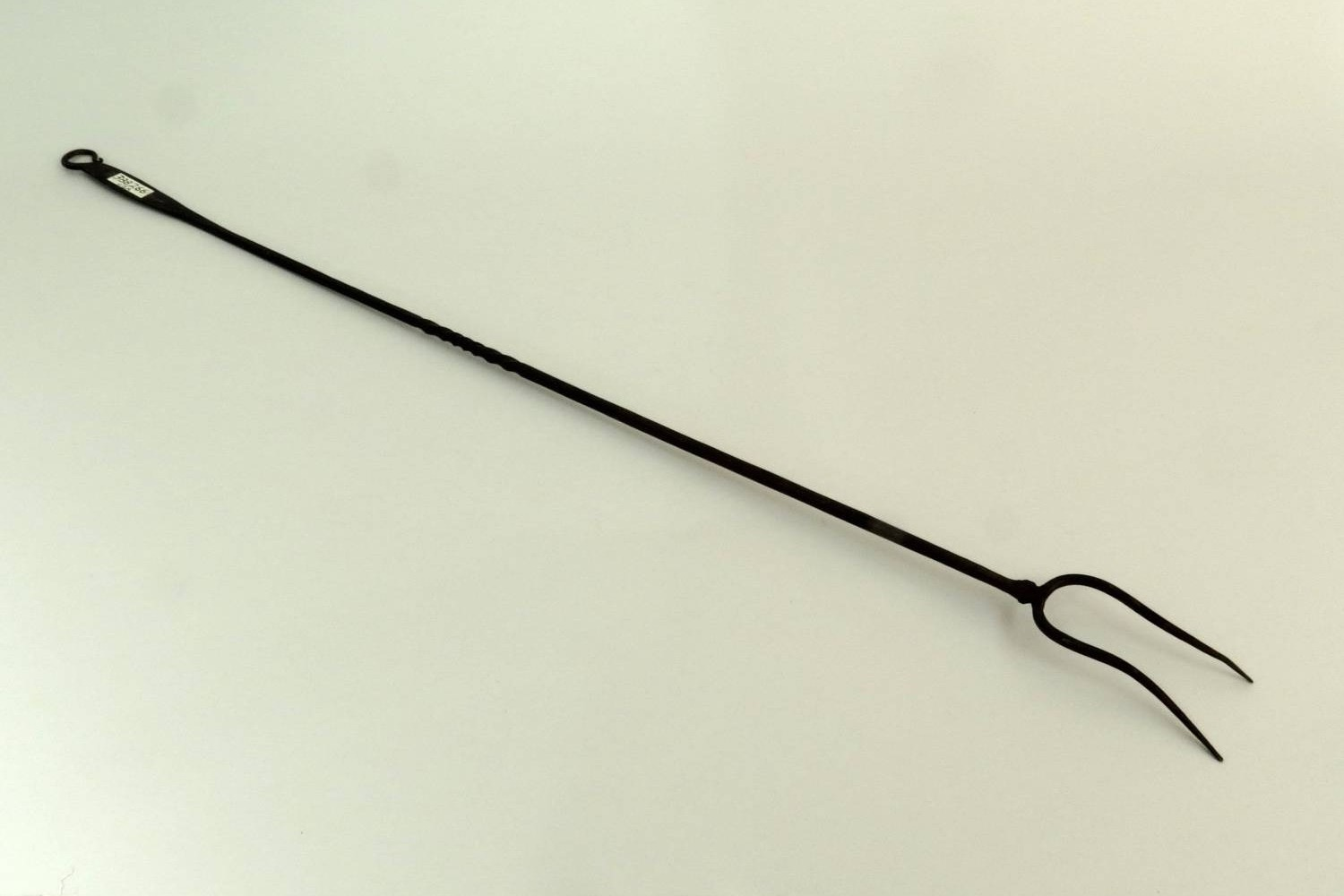
Wrought iron toasting fork (c.1900)

A toasting fork is a long-handled fork used to brown and toast food such as bread, cheese, and apples by holding the pronged end in front of an open fire or other heat source. It can also be used to toast marshmallows, broil hot dogs, and heat hot dog buns over campfires.

== Description ==
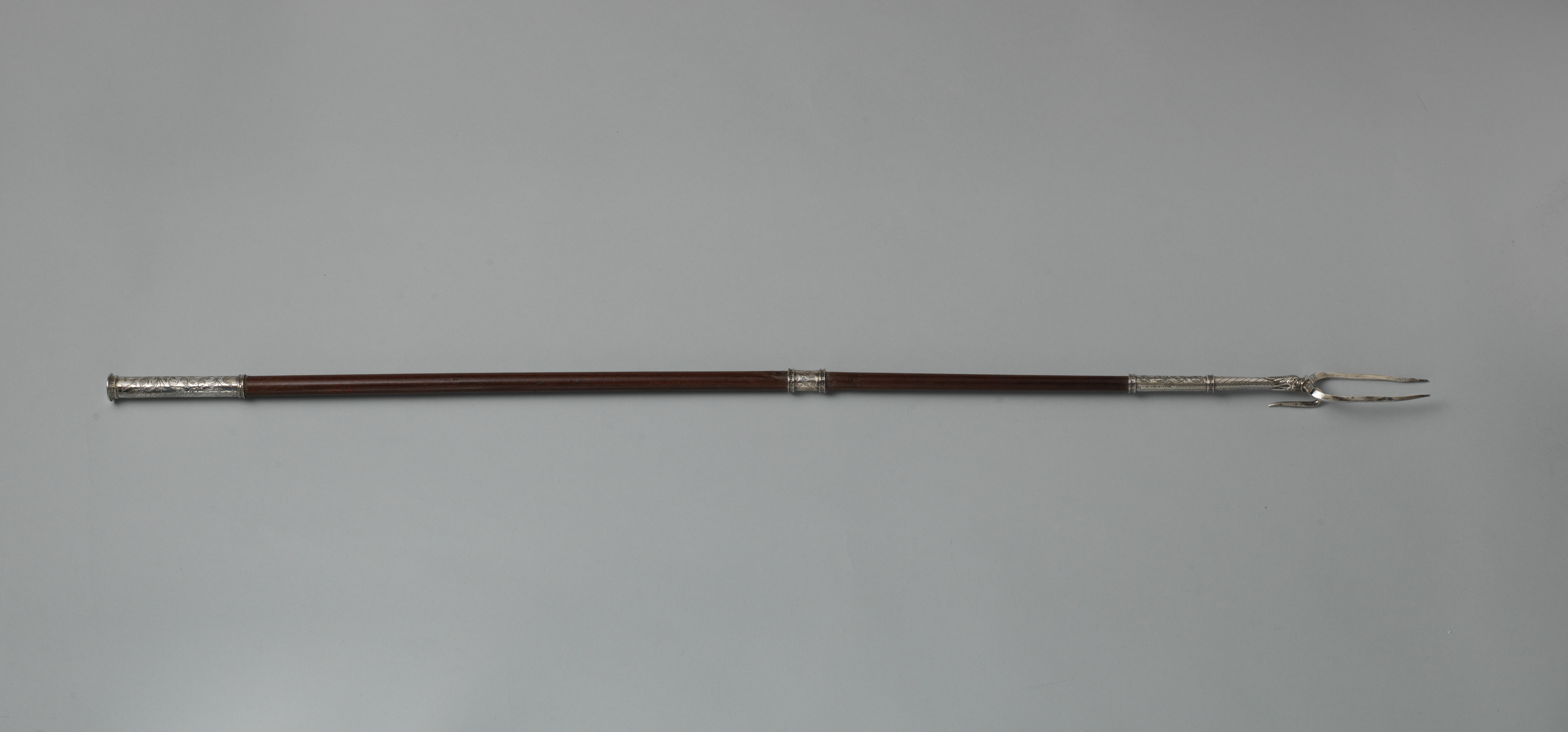
Toasting fork (1561). One of only two known toasting forks from the 16th century, possibly from Norfolk, England

Toasting forks were traditionally made from metal such as wrought iron, brass, or silver, and later from steel, but handles of wood or ivory might be used to prevent the heat of the fire being conducted to the hand. Food is pierced with the prongs of the fork and held over the fire until it turns brown. The toasting process requires care and attention to ensure that the item is evenly cooked and not burnt.

Many toasting forks had a built-in suspension ring on one end, which allowed them to be hung when not in use. Some forks had telescopic handles which made them portable for travellers, and allowed the toast to be held closer to the fire without burning one's fingers.

While most toasting forks were designed to be held by hand, some were designed into trivets or weighted bases, and could swivel like an angled desklamp over the fire. Collectors sometimes refer to this as the "lazy toaster".

== History ==
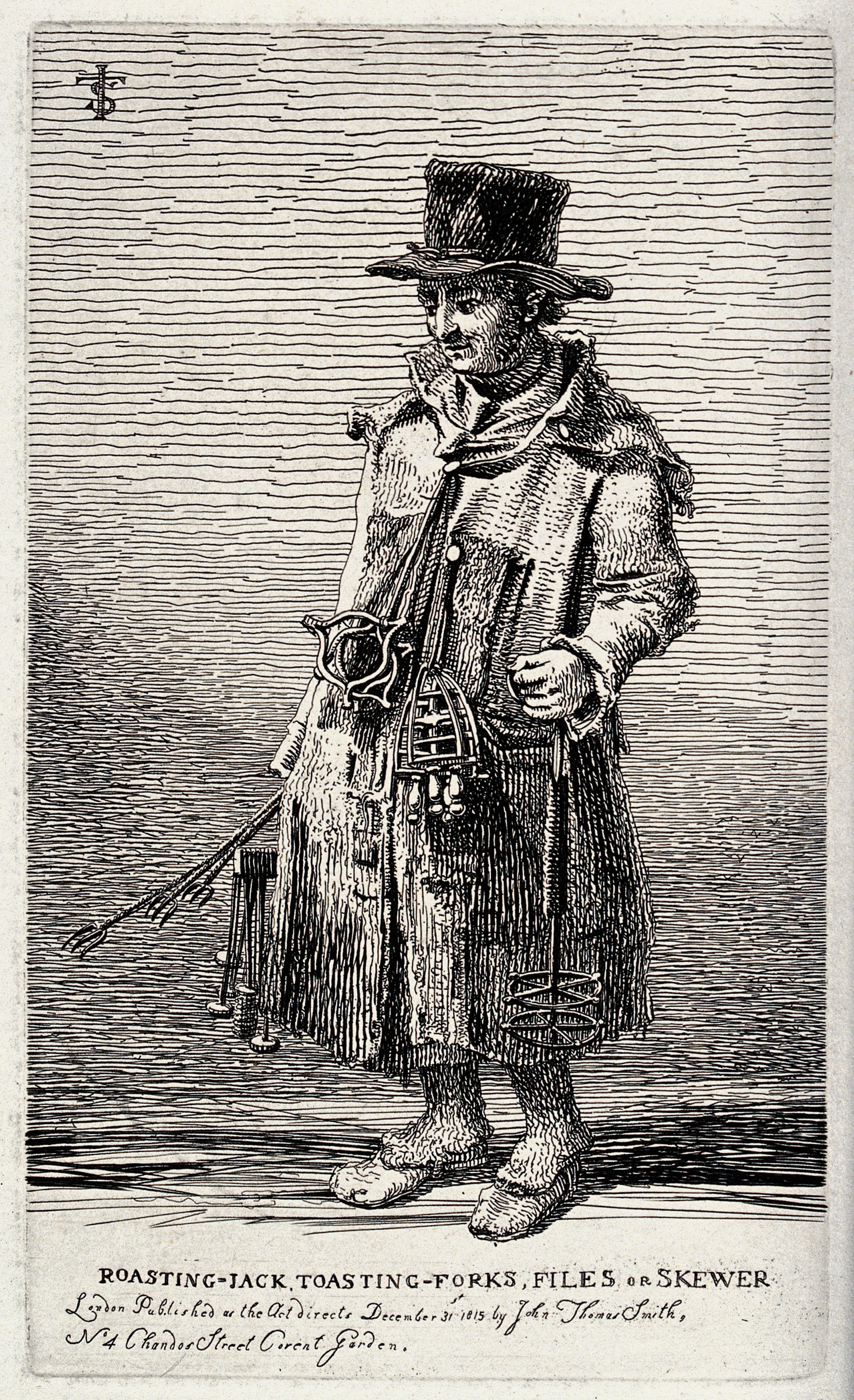
An itinerant peddler of toasting forks, skewers and roasting jacks

=== Britain ===
In England, toasting forks date back to at least the mid-16th century, with at least two forks extant from that era. They were typically used by those in the middle and upper strata of society. Toasting irons are compared to swords in the Shakespeare plays King John and Henry V, and a 17th-century wrought-iron toasting fork is held in the Shakespeare Birthplace Trust collection.

In the 18th century, toasting forks often had three staggered prongs, to hold the bread more firmly. Toasting cheese became vogue during the Georgian era, and toasting forks emerged with "peculiar brackets to hold a slice of cheese" as well as bread. Some Scottish forks with four prongs had intricate decorative detail, likely influenced by continental European smithcraft.

Many inventors applied for patents for more sophisticated toasting forks from the 1790s onward. Scottish inventor James Watt, best known for the Watt steam engine, developed a retractable toasting fork. From 1809, Sir Edward Thomason of Birmingham invented several types of sliding toasting forks, including a popular one with collapsible prongs and slides encased within a japanned handle that drew into the mouth of a metal-plated snake head, which he regretted not patenting. Another Thomason invention was a telescopic fork that included a mechanism for brushing the hearth.

Toasting forks were popular in the Victorian era, and are often mentioned in novels by Charles Dickens. In Oliver Twist, the villain Fagin first appears standing in a dark room in front of a fire, holding a toasting fork, suggestive of his "devilish" nature. In The Pickwick Papers, the alcoholic non-conformist minister Mr. Stiggins first appears sitting in front of the fireplace in the parlour of the public house, imbibing pineapple rum as he periodically checks his toasting fork to ascertain whether the toast is ready.

According to The London Ritz Book of Afternoon Tea, "Every careful Victorian furnished his son with a brass toasting fork and a silver muffin dish for afternoons in college rooms and later at the Club." In 1854, Chef Alexis Benoit Soyer gave a recipe/prescription for their proper use to produce toast in Shilling Cookery for the People. Toasting forks of various sizes were advertised in the Harrods 1895 Catalogue, with prices ranging from threepence to one shilling and sixpence. They continued to be used into the 20th century, even as open hearths were replaced with wood- and coal-burning cookers and gas stoves in the home.

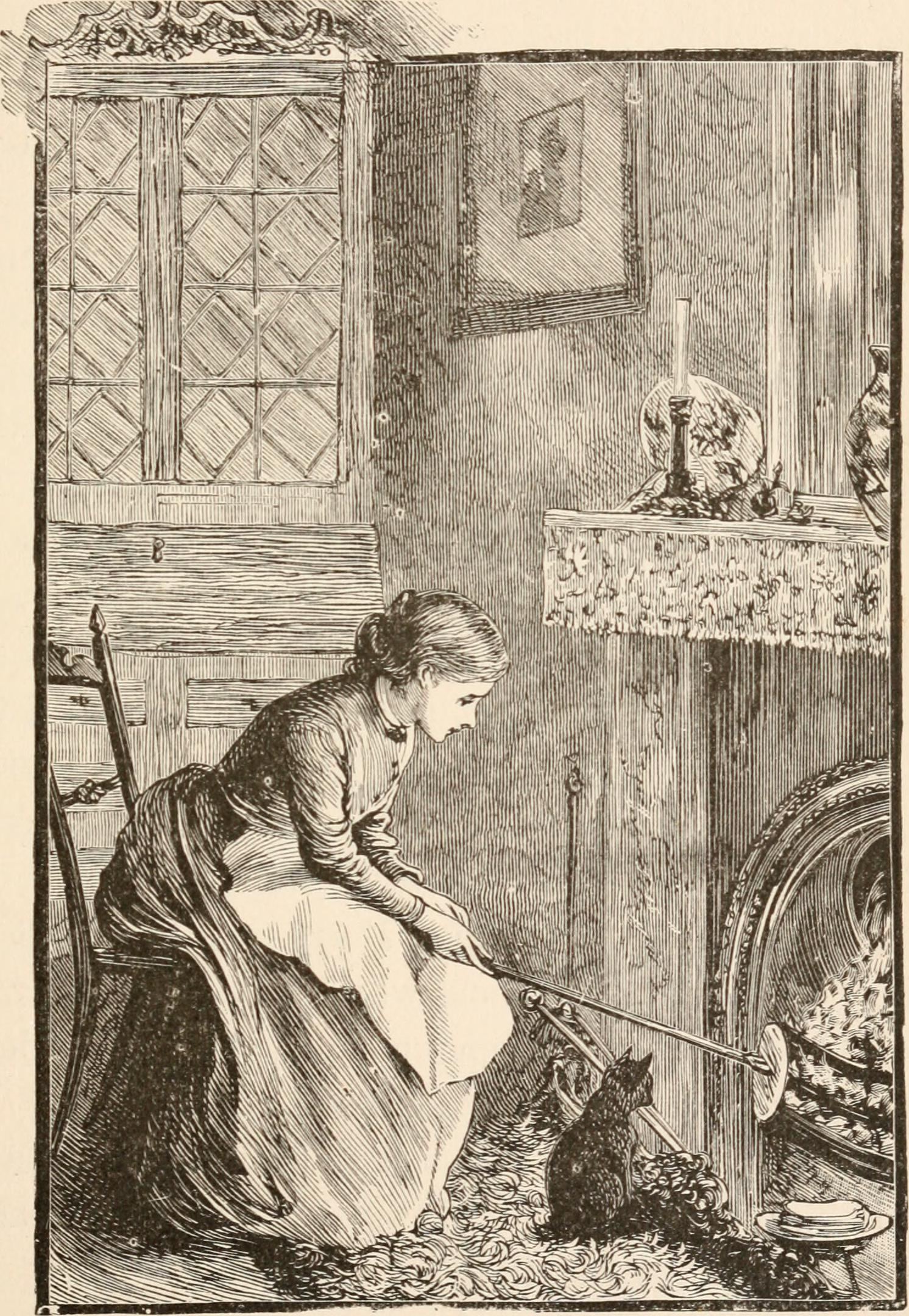
A maid uses a toasting fork in the bedroom fireplace in Donald and Dorothy (1891) by Mary Mapes Dodge

=== North America ===
In 1620, Pilgrims from England had toasting forks and kettle forks with them when they landed at Plymouth Colony on the Mayflower, but did not have table forks. While some British colonists in America used elaborate hearth toasters that could hold several pieces of bread, cooks of "more modest means" relied on toasting forks made of forged iron. Toasting forks continued to be an important utensil in the early American kitchen of the 1800s, when activity centered around the cooking fireplace.

The American Agriculturalist magazine advised in November 1868 that the proper way to make toast at home was to use stale bread rather than fresh bread as was customary in hotels. The bread should be sliced "moderately thin", placed on a toasting fork, and held near the fire until it was warmed through. Only as a final step should the fork be brought nearer to the fire and turned light brown or deep golden yellow, before being buttered.

The July 1877 issue of American Agriculturalist included instructions on how to make a home-made toasting fork out of "any refuse piece of tin" such as the bottom of a box of sardines, or the side of a can of fruit which had been flattened. The magazine advised cutting three triangular pieces and bending them up to form "prongs", and threading three wires through the holes and twisting them to form a handle.

== Modern usage ==
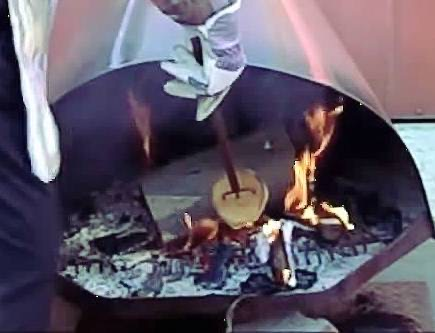
Modern toasting fork with crumpet

Although the first electric toasters were patented between 1904 and 1909, the early models were manually operated, and still required users to monitor and observe whether the toast was "done". (Note: Many sources erroneously credit "Alan MacMasters" with inventing the electric toaster in 1893. This originated from a Wikipedia hoax.) Toasting forks gradually declined in domestic use after the first automatic electric toasters appeared on the market as a luxury item in 1926, and electricity became more widely available in homes starting in the 1930s. In the United Kingdom, the use of toasting forks persisted in households with fireplaces, or electric heaters. Through the 1900s, crumpets browned over an open fire using a toasting fork then drenched in butter were considered a midwinter delicacy in England.

Today, toasting forks are often used around campfires, constructed out of simple materials, such as Y-shaped tree branches or wire coathangers. They are also sold as an accessory for woodburning stoves, and as a novelty item.

In 2022, an article in The Telegraph pointed to the use of extendable marshmallow toasting forks purchased from Amazon, instead of a wooden stick, as an example of how "the middle class have ruined camping" by turning it into "glamping". In the UK, many cultural commentators insist that while electric toasters are fast and convenient, the "perfect" way to prepare toast is with "a toasting fork and a real fire".

== Use by scientists ==
In the 19th century, a toasting fork was one of the many everyday objects which scientist Michael Faraday used during his lectures. In one demonstration, he built an electrical machine using a glass bottle supported by an inverted stool, with a tea canister on a tumbler as the conductor, and the toasting fork as the collector.

In the 20th century, the great physicist G. I. Taylor experimented with a four-pronged toasting fork and found that, when it was waved so that the airflow was in the plane of the tines then they sang much more loudly than when the airflow was perpendicular to the plane.

== Collections ==
The Victoria and Albert Museum has a collection of toasting forks which was mostly curated by the wealthy antiquarian Louis Clarke.

== Gallery ==
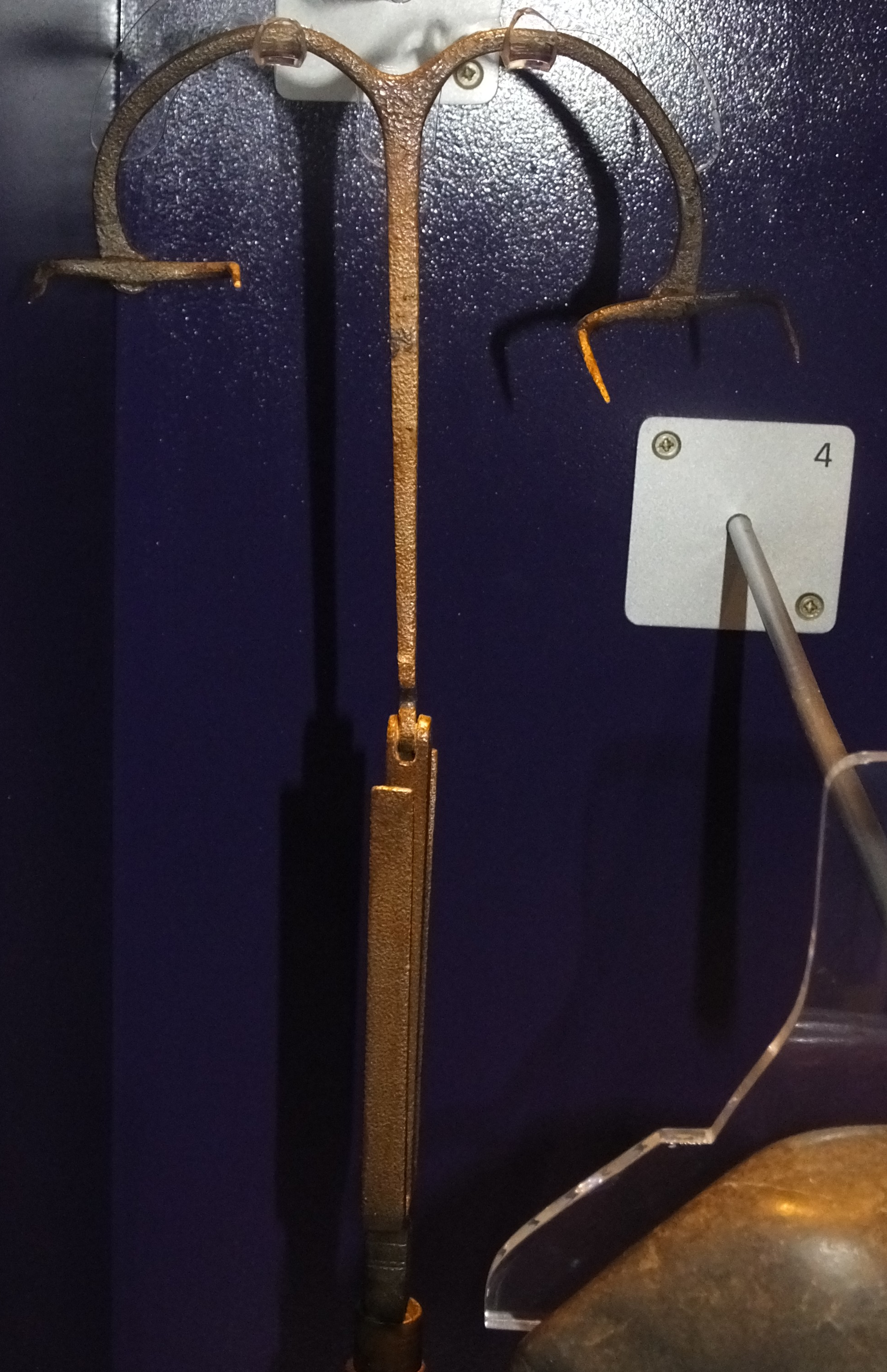
Toasting fork at Clitheroe Castle Museum in Lancashire, England

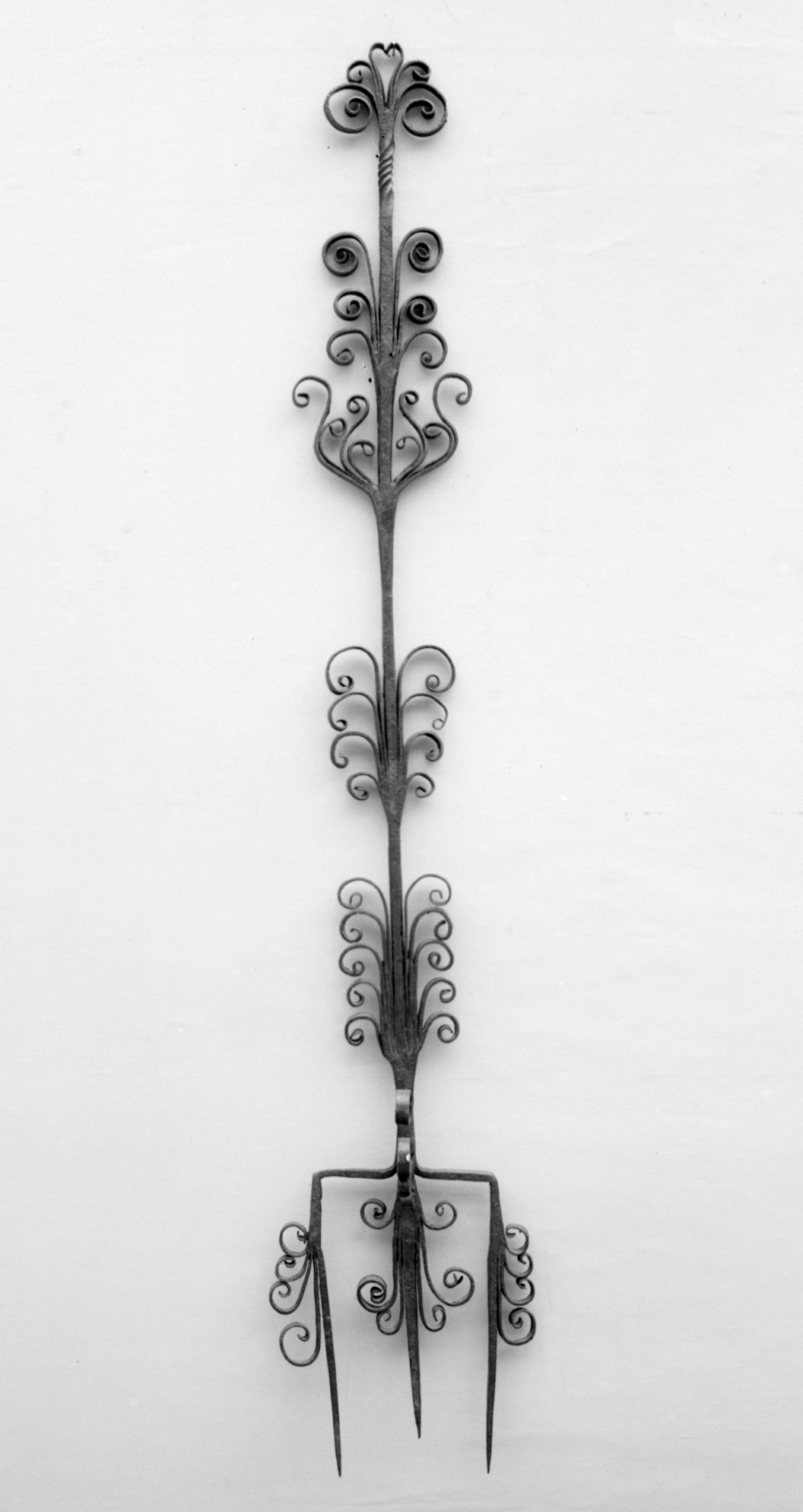
Broaching or toasting fork (17th century), possibly Spanish, at The Metropolitan Museum of Art, New York

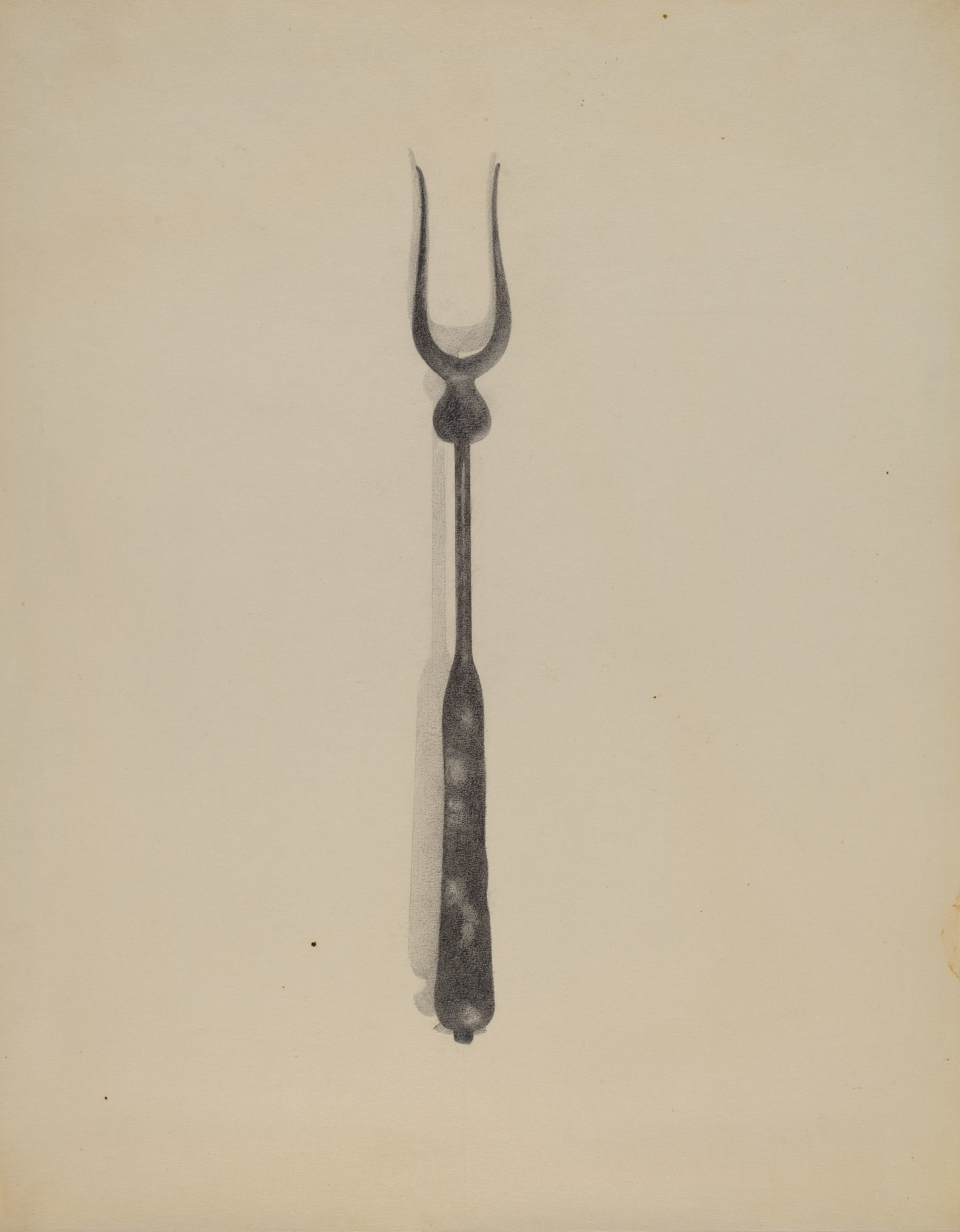
Toasting fork (c.1936) by Anna Aloisi, graphite on paper, at National Gallery of Art, Washington, D.C.

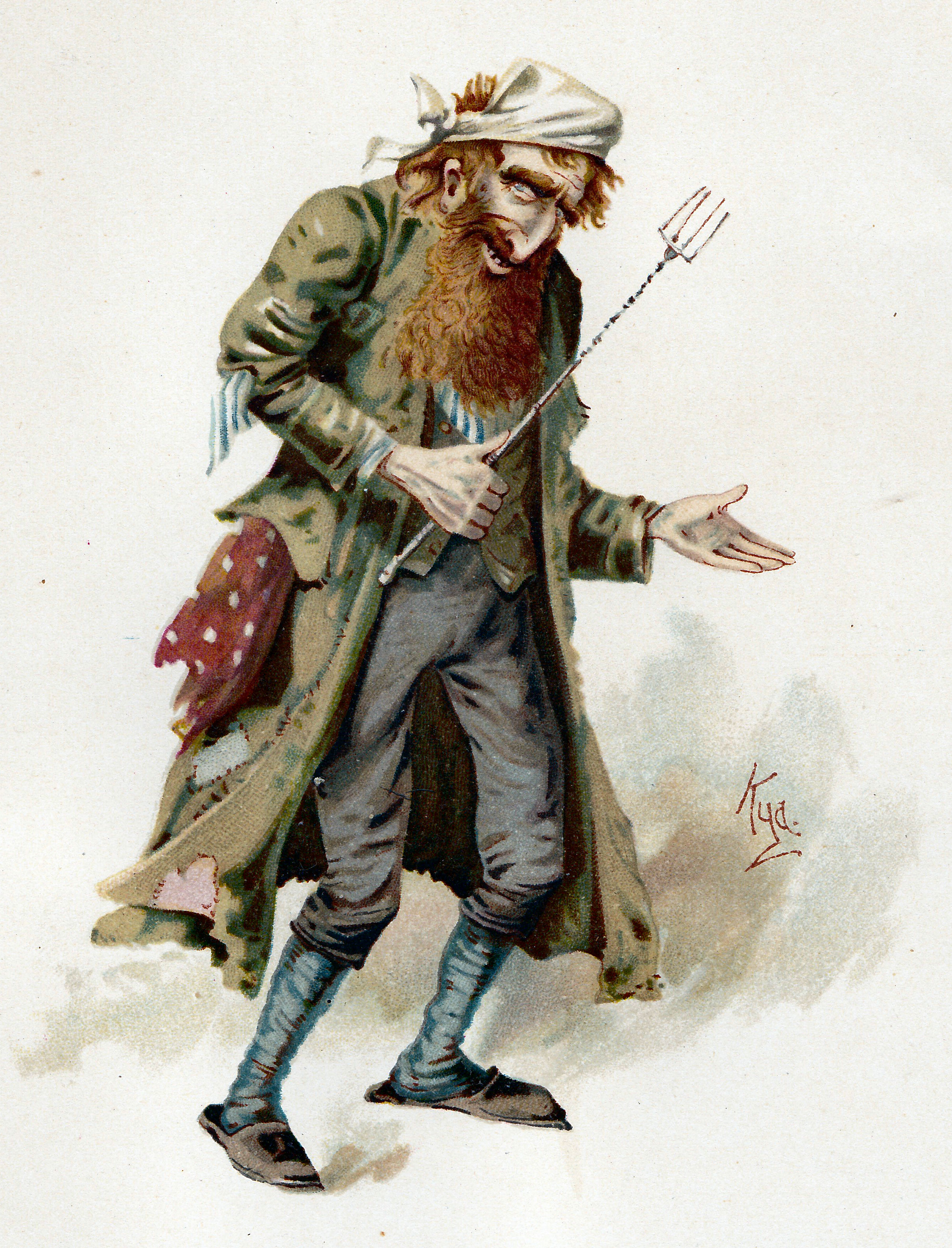
Fagin wielding a toasting fork in Oliver Twist, illustrated by 'Kyd' in 1889

== See also ==
- S'more
