= Edible tableware =

Utensil made of food or which can be eaten

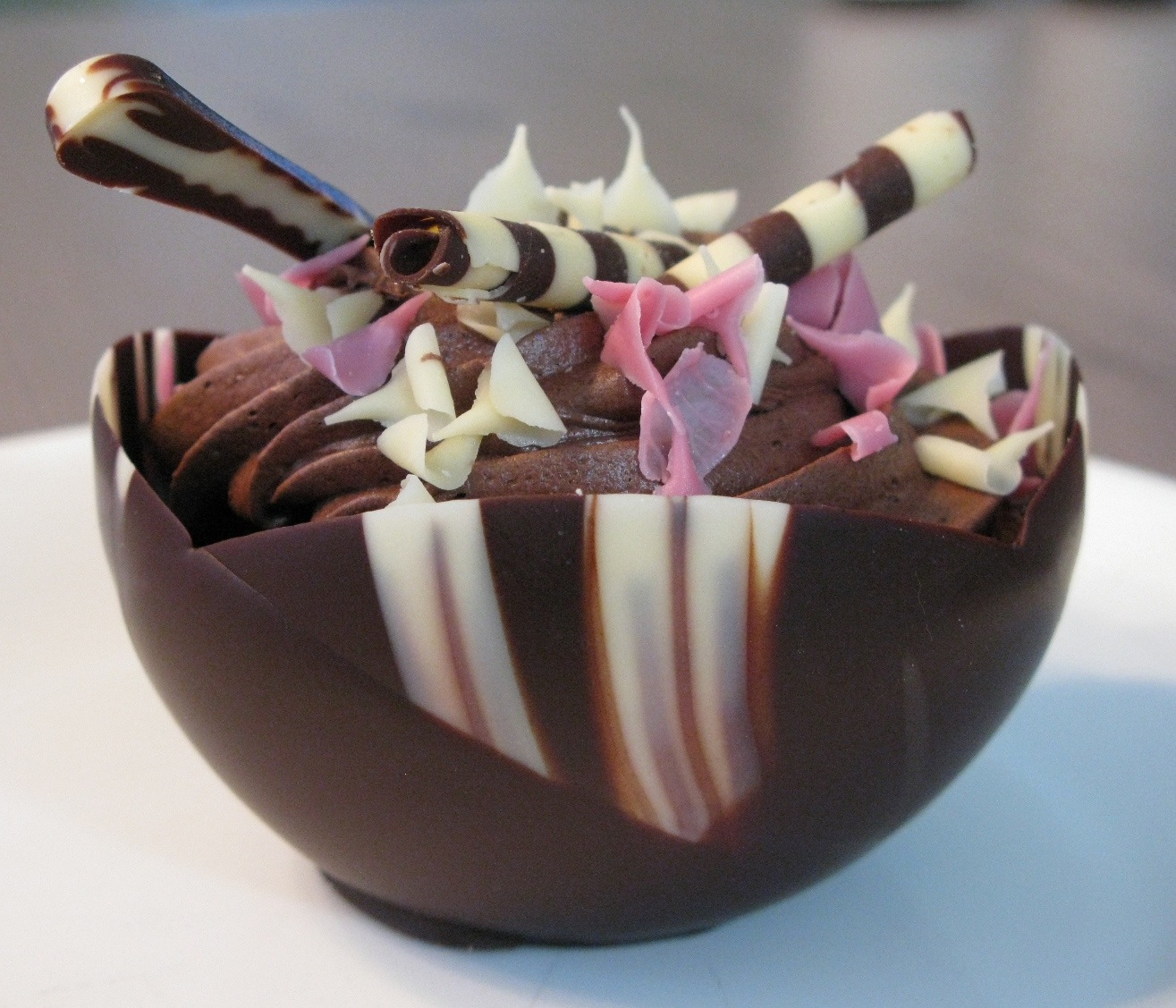
A chocolate mousse cupcake with edible chocolate straws and chocolate bowl.

Edible tableware is tableware, such as plates, drinkware glasses, utensils and cutlery, that is edible. Edible tableware can be homemade and has also been mass-produced by some companies, and can be prepared using many different foods.

== Overview ==
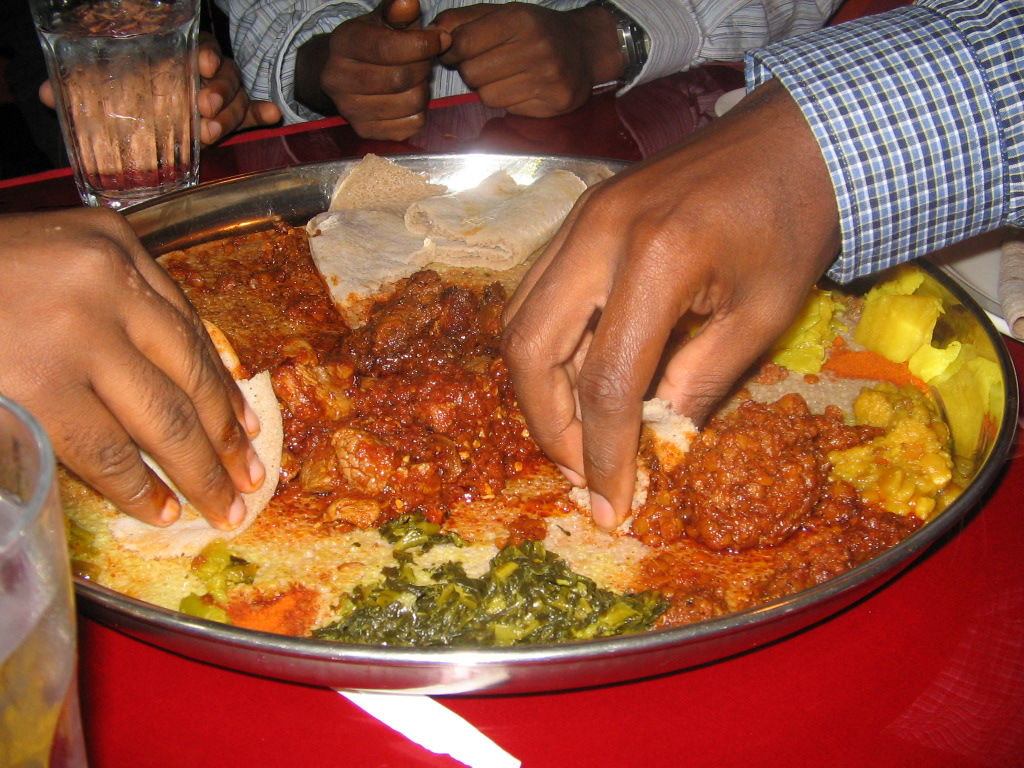
Injera bread being used as a utensil to scoop wat

Edible tableware can be homemade or mass-produced, and is prepared from various foods. For example, homemade tableware can be fashioned using sliced celery as chopsticks, and celery can also be used to scoop foods such as dips and cream cheese. A leaf of cabbage can be used as a spoon, and a carrot stick that has been sharpened can be used as a skewer. Edible bowls and plates can be prepared using many methods. For example, bread which has had its center removed can be used for soups, and cheese can be baked in an oven and formed into the desired shape. Chocolate can also be fashioned into edible tableware. (Note: "Beyond Yohay's chocolatey edible tableware, retail operators have many choices in using chocolate to its best advantage.")

Flatbread such as khobez is sometimes used as an eating utensil, such as when it is used to scoop hummus, and Ethiopian injera bread is used as a utensil to scoop wat. In West Africa, flatbread is sometimes used to scoop fufu for consumption. In India, chapati flatbread is used as a utensil to consume sambar and dal. In North and Central America, the tortilla is used as a utensil to scoop various foods such as salsa and bean dips. Foods such as crackers, corn and tortilla chips, crudités, bread and cheese sticks can also be used as edible utensils.

== History ==
Edible tableware such as cups, bowls, plates and platters prepared using sugar paste have been in use since at least the Elizabethan era and edible tableware was considered a sign of wealth. In 1562, a recipe for edible tableware and cutlery, such as knives, forks, chopsticks and spoons, was published by Alexius Pedemontanus.

== See also ==
- Bread bowl
- List of eating utensils
- List of food preparation utensils
- List of serving utensils
- Trencher (tableware)
