= Fork =

Eating utensil

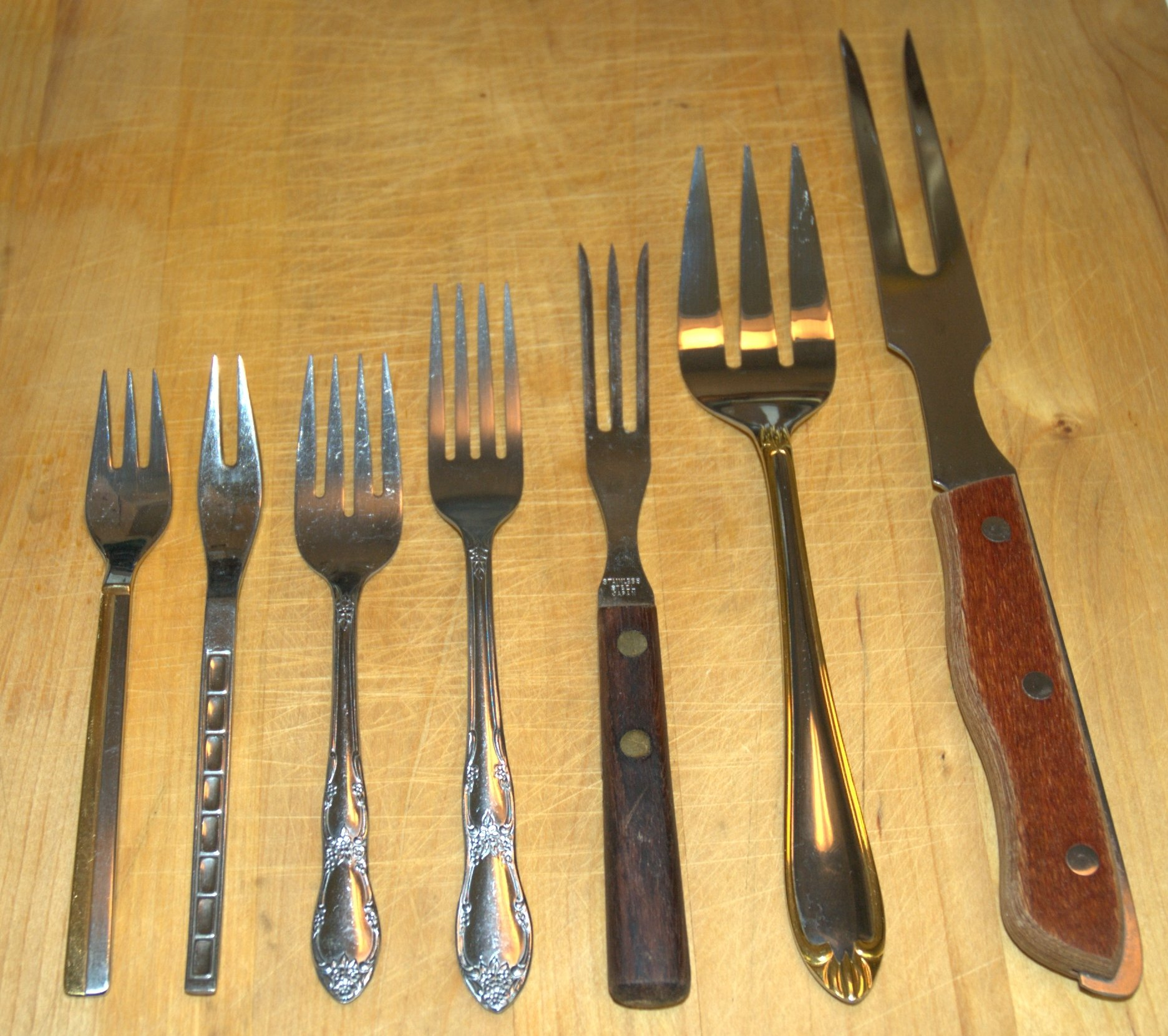
From left to right: pastry fork, relish fork, salad fork, dinner fork, cold cuts fork, serving fork, carving fork

In cutlery or kitchenware, a fork (from Latin: furca 'pitchfork') is a utensil, now usually made of metal, whose long handle terminates in a head that branches into several narrow and often slightly curved tines with which one can spear foods either to hold them to cut with a knife or to lift them to the mouth.

== History ==
Bone forks have been found in archaeological sites of the Bronze Age Qijia culture (2400–1900 BC) and the Shang dynasty (c. 1600 – c. 1050 BC), as well as later Chinese dynasties. A stone carving from an Eastern Han tomb (in Ta-kua-liang, Suide County, Shaanxi) depicts three hanging two-pronged forks in a dining scene. Similar forks have also been depicted on top of a stove in a scene at another Eastern Han tomb (in Suide County, Shaanxi).

In Ancient Egypt, large forks were used as cooking utensils.

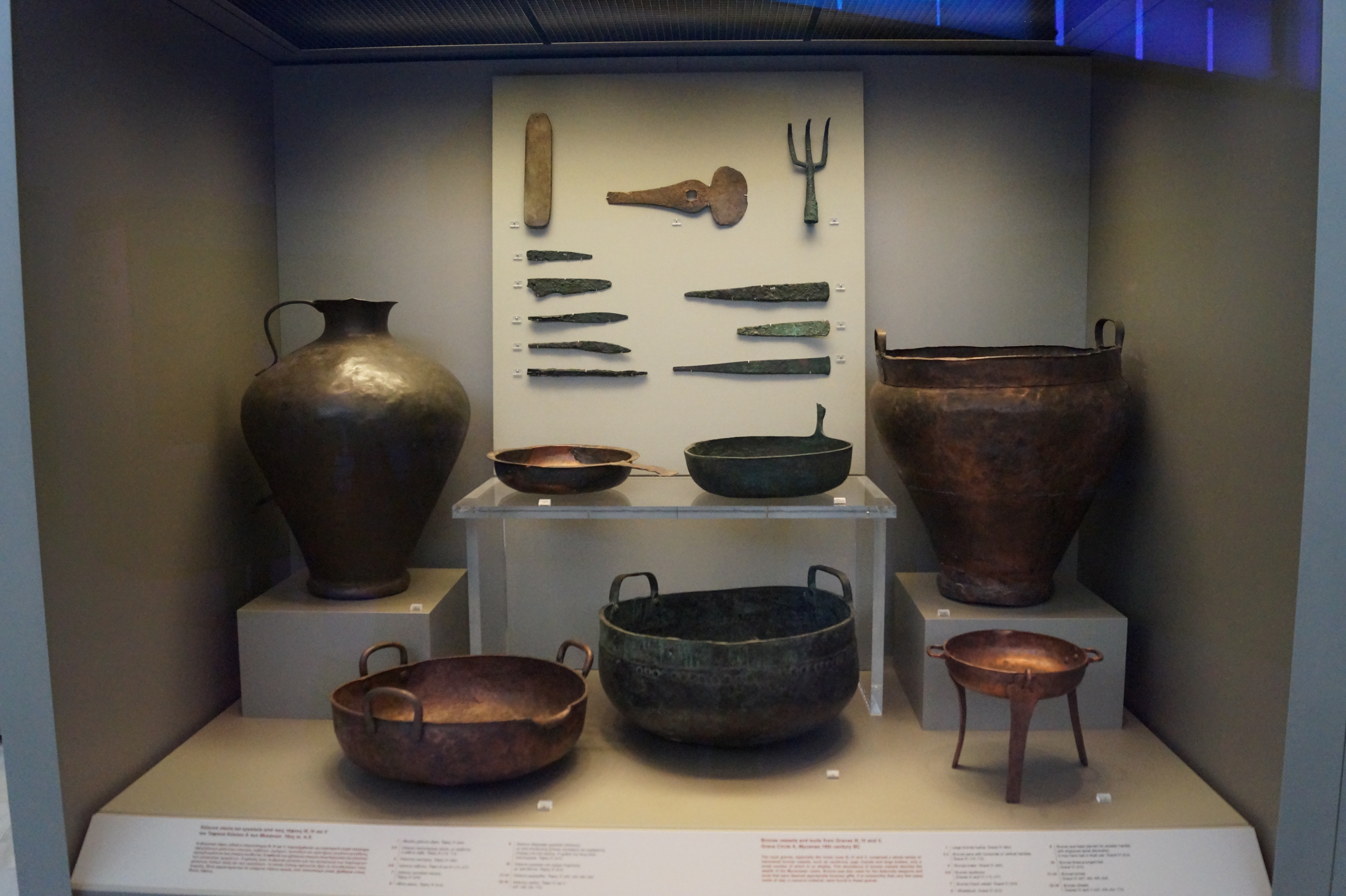
Mycenaean Greek grave finds, 16th century BC, including a Bronze fork

A bronze fork, dating from the 16th century BC, was found in a Mycenaean Greek grave.

In the Roman Empire, bronze and silver forks were used. With many surviving examples of which are displayed in museums across Europe. The use varied according to local customs, social class, and type of food, but in earlier periods forks were mostly used as cooking and serving utensils.

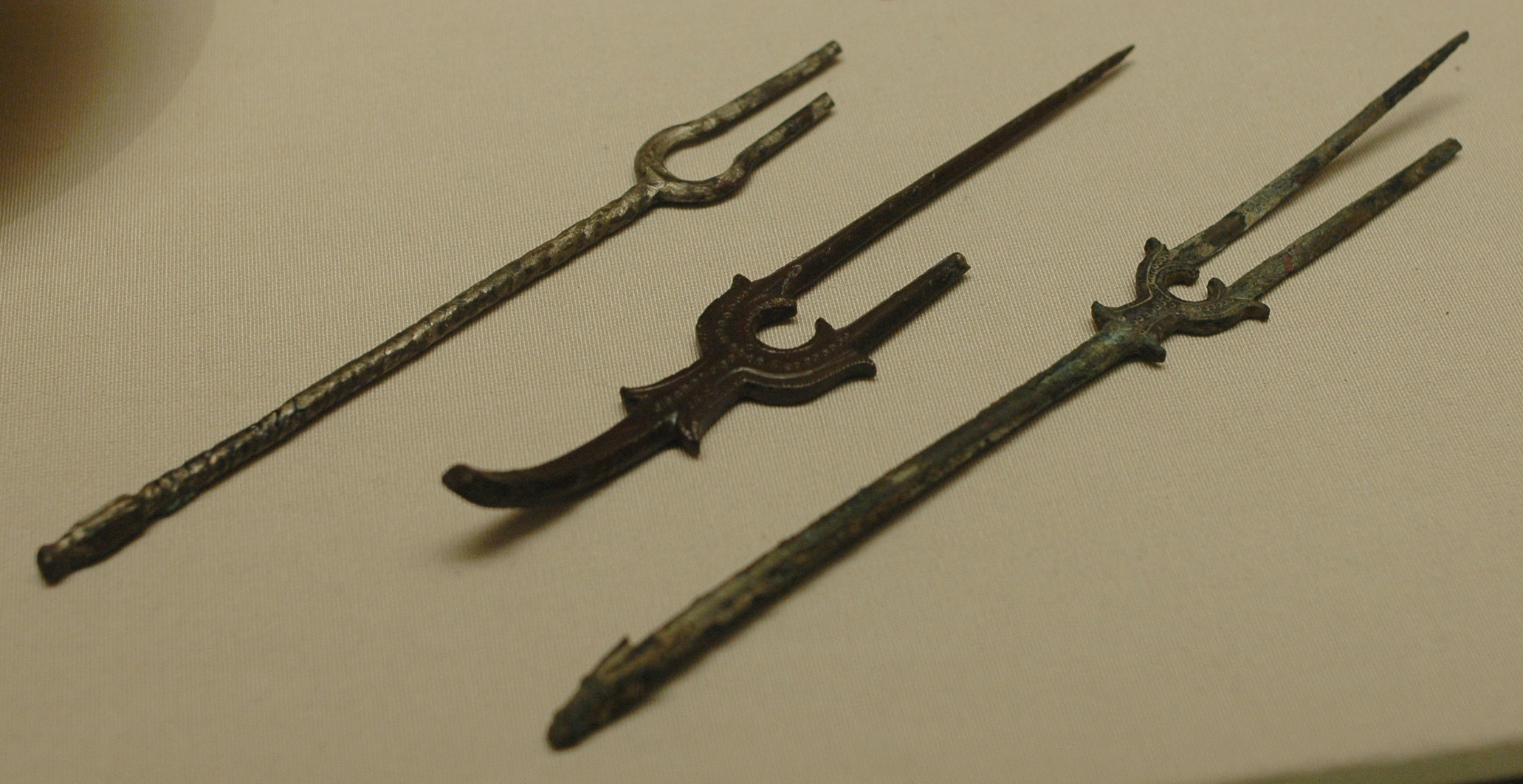
Bronze forks made in Persia during the 8th or 9th century

Although its origin may go back to Ancient Greece, the personal table fork was most likely invented in the Eastern Roman (Byzantine) Empire, where they were in common use by the 4th century. Records show that by the 9th century in some elite circles of Persia a similar utensil known as a barjyn was in limited use. By the 10th century, the table fork was in common use throughout the Middle East. According to some authors, chronographers mention the astonishment that the Byzantine princess Theophanu caused to the court of the Holy Roman Empire, where she married Emperor Otto II), because she was using a fork instead of her hands when she was eating. In addition, according to Peter Damian, the Byzantine princess Maria Argyropoulina brought some golden forks to Venice, when she married Giovanni Orseolo, the son of the Doge Pietro II Orseolo in 1004. Damian condemned the fork as "vanity". The same story (with Maria Argyropoulina) was mistakenly said about the Byzantine princess Theodora Doukaina who came to Venice to marry the Doge Domenico Selvo and was confused with Maria Argyropoulina by later authors.

By the 11th century, the table fork had become increasingly prevalent in the Italian Peninsula because of historical ties with the Eastern Roman Empire and, as pasta became a greater part of the Italian diet, continued to gain popularity, displacing the long wooden spike formerly used since the fork's three spikes proved better suited to gathering the noodles. By the 14th century the table fork had become commonplace in Italy, and by 1600 was almost universal among the merchant and upper classes. It was proper for a guest to arrive with his own fork and spoon enclosed in a box called a cadena; this usage was introduced to the French court with Catherine de' Medici's entourage. Although in Portugal forks were first used around 1450 by Infanta Beatrice, Duchess of Viseu, King Manuel I of Portugal's mother, only by the 16th century, when they had become part of Italian etiquette, did forks enter into common use in southwestern Europe, gaining some currency in Spain, and gradually spreading to France. The rest of Europe did not adopt the fork until the 18th century.

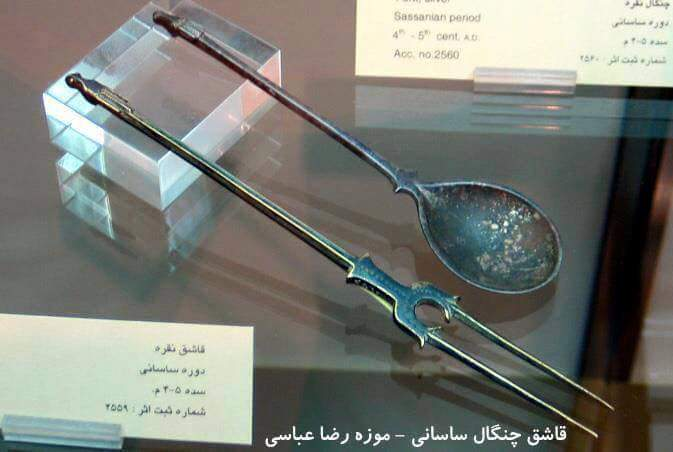
Sasanian silver fork (4th century)

The fork's adoption in northern Europe was slower. Its use was first described in English by Thomas Coryat in a volume of writings on his Italian travels (1611), but for many years it was viewed as an unmanly Italian affectation. Some writers of the Roman Catholic Church expressly disapproved of its use; St. Peter Damian seeing it as "excessive delicacy". It was not until the 18th century that the fork became commonly used in Great Britain, although some sources say that forks were common in France, England and Sweden already by the early 17th century.

The fork did not become popular in North America until near the time of the American Revolution. The four-tine design became current in the early 19th century.

== Types of forks ==
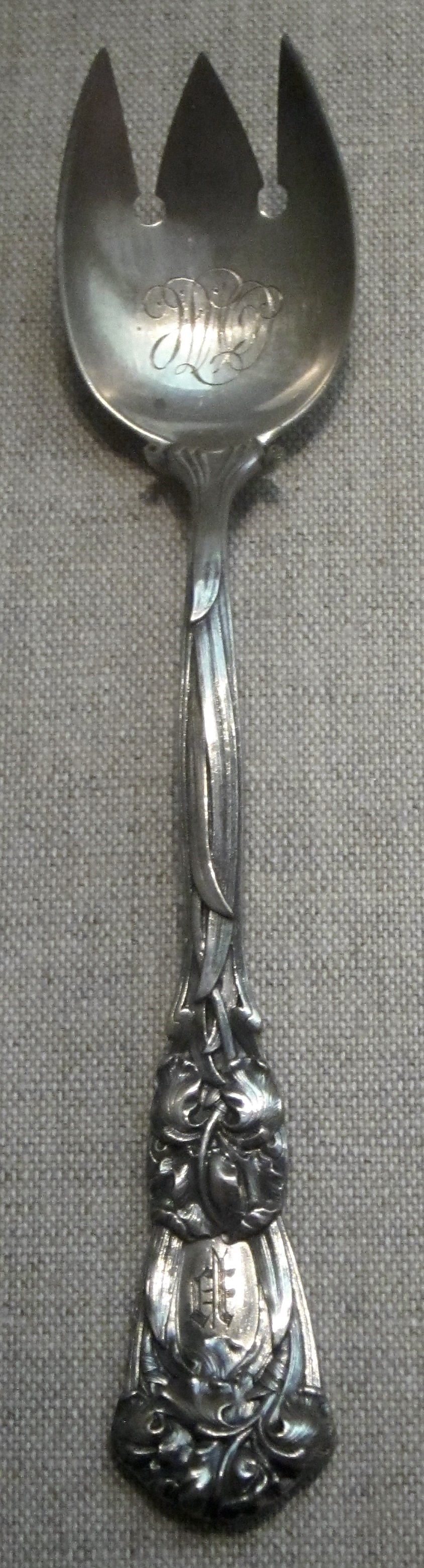
An ice cream fork from the early 20th century

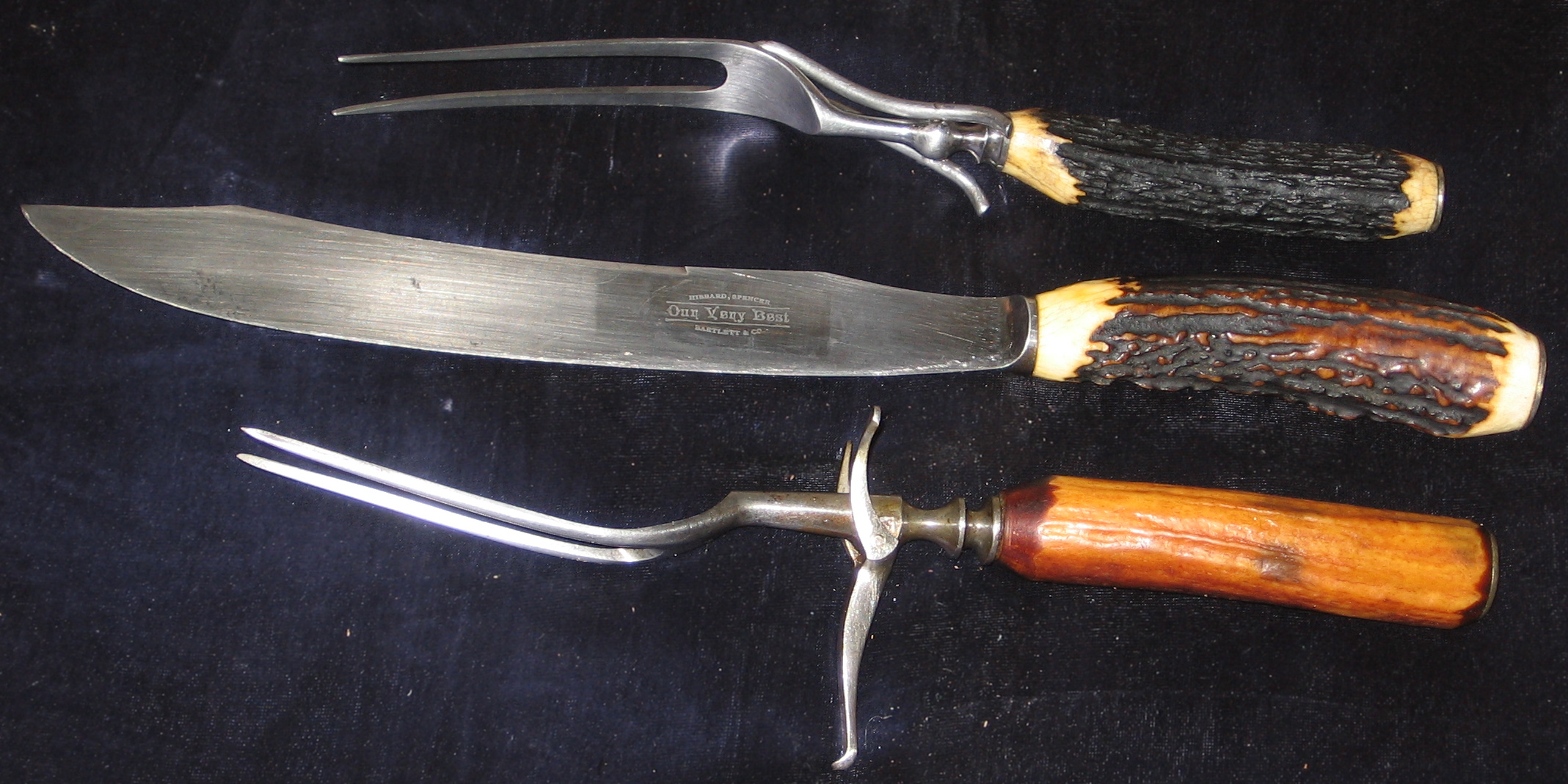
Carving knife and carving forks. Note folding fork guards.

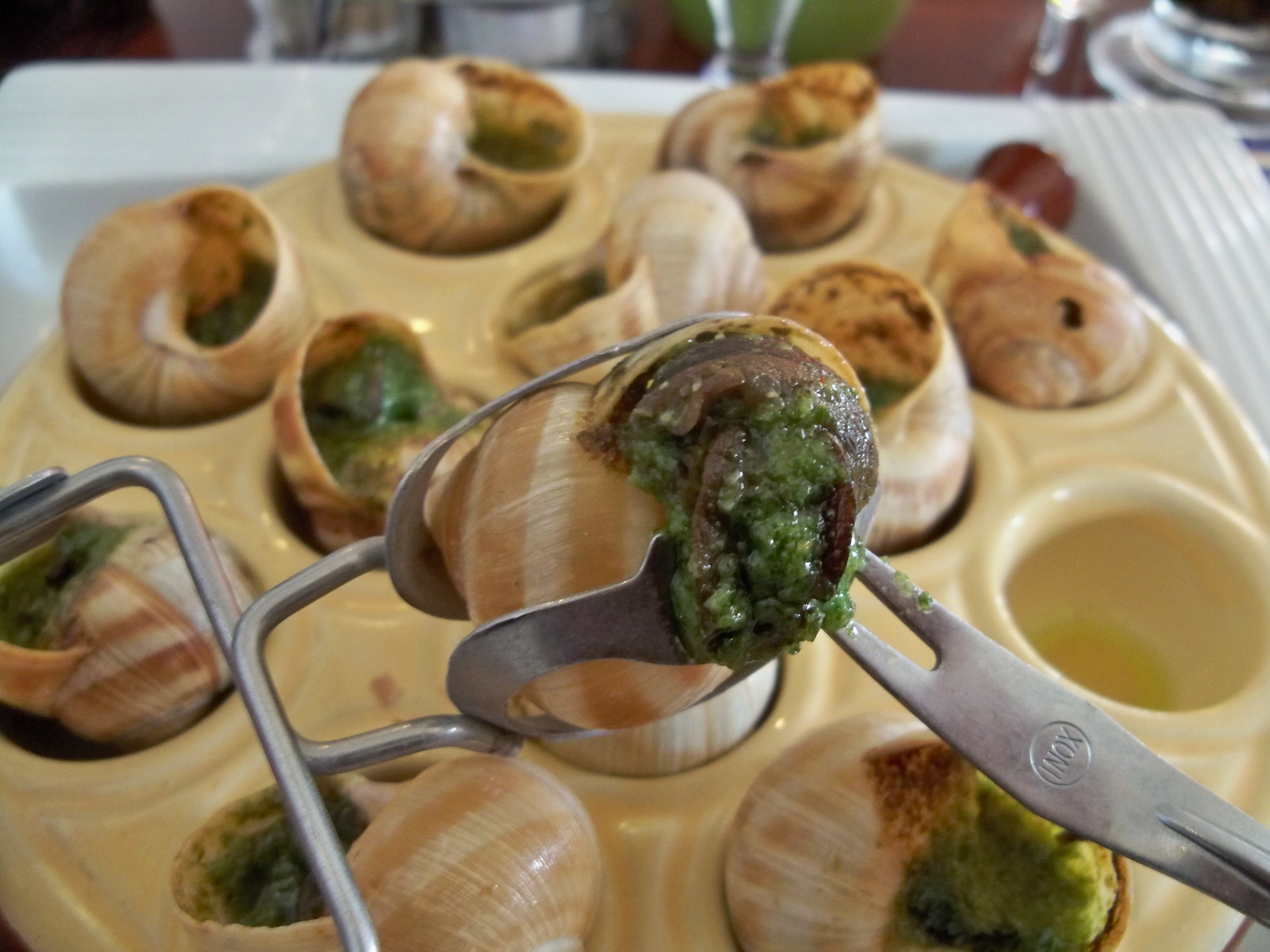
Fourchette à escargot or snail fork used with a pince à escargot to grasp the snail shell

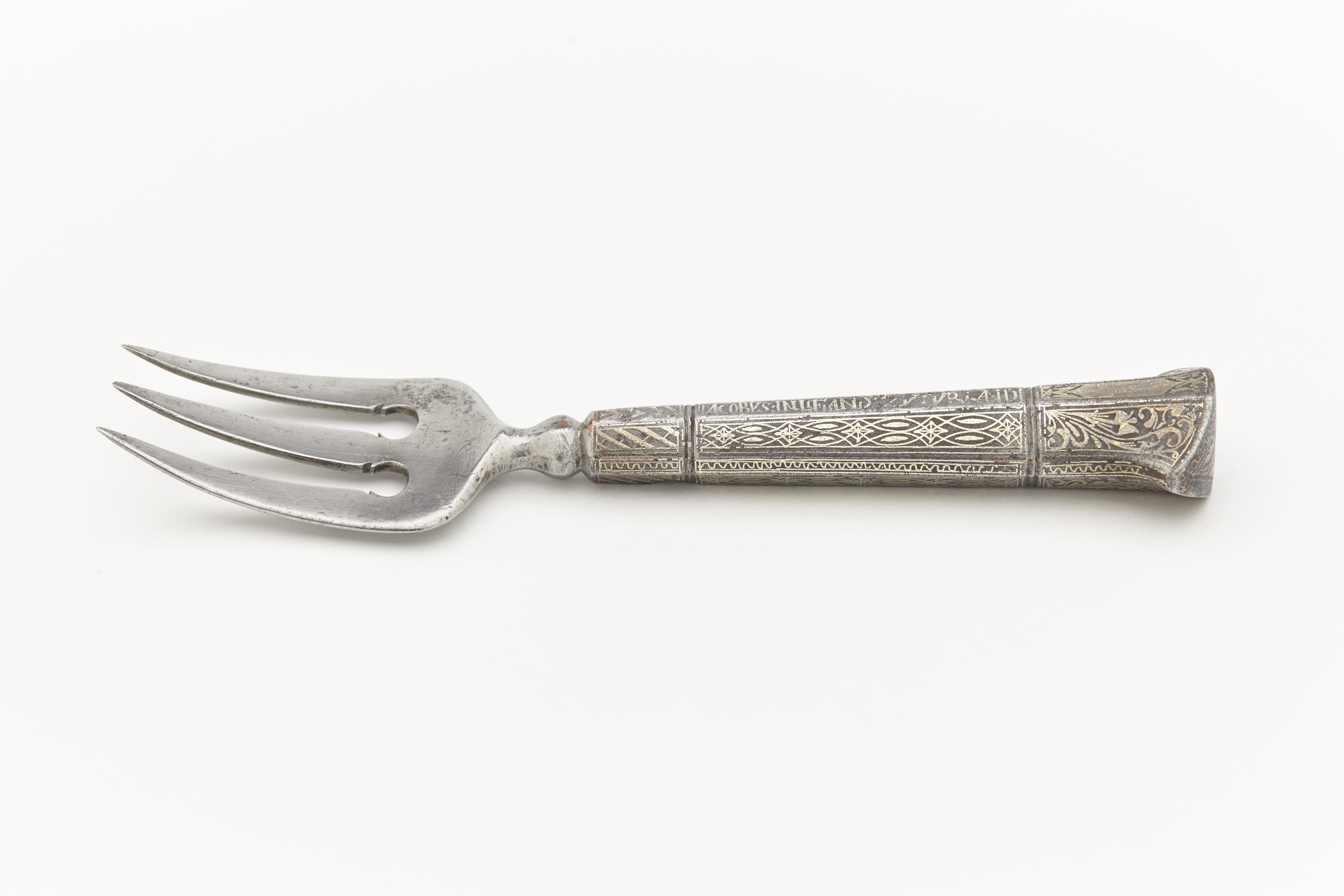
Carving fork from 1640

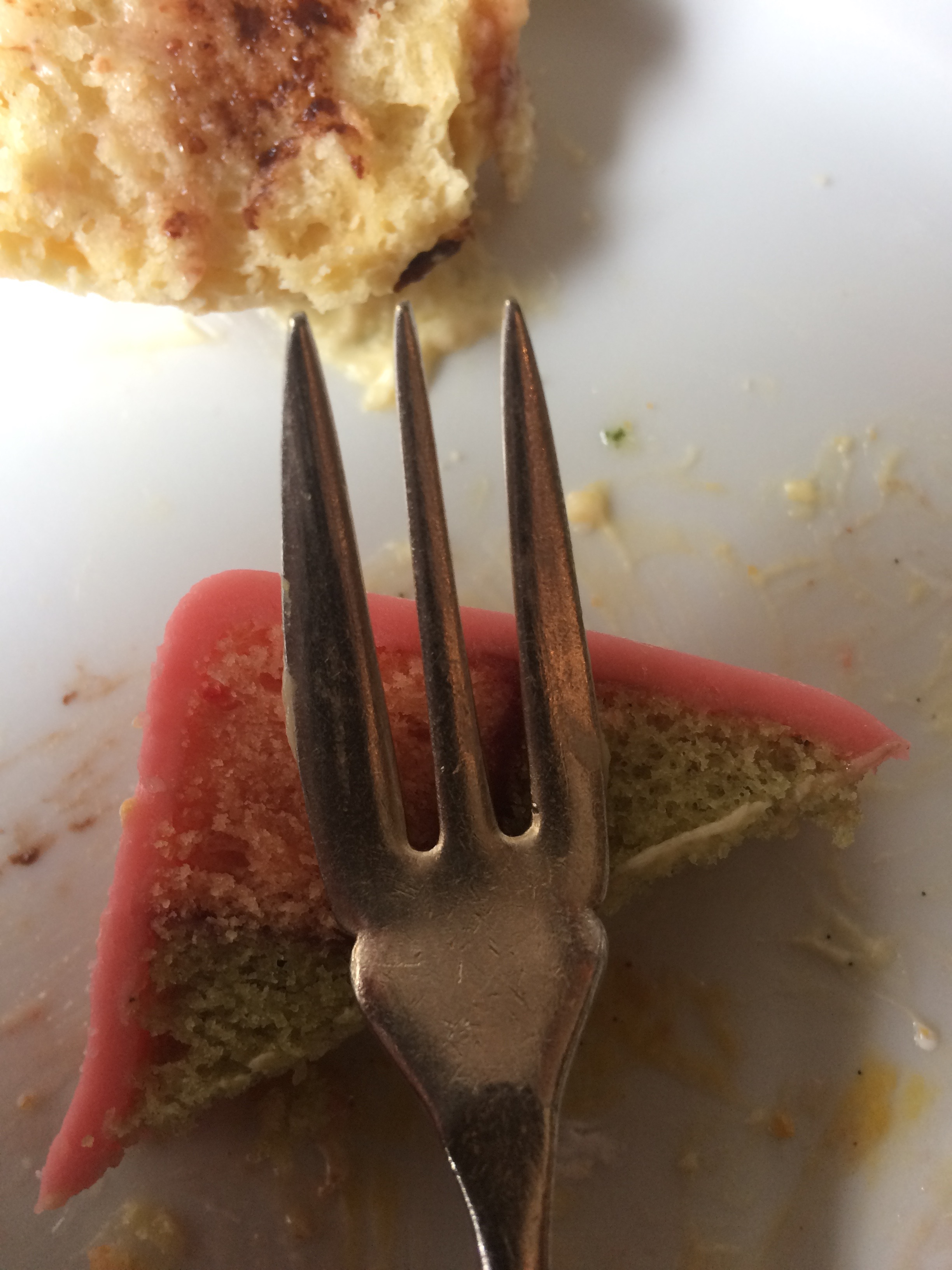
Right handed pastry fork with widened left tine

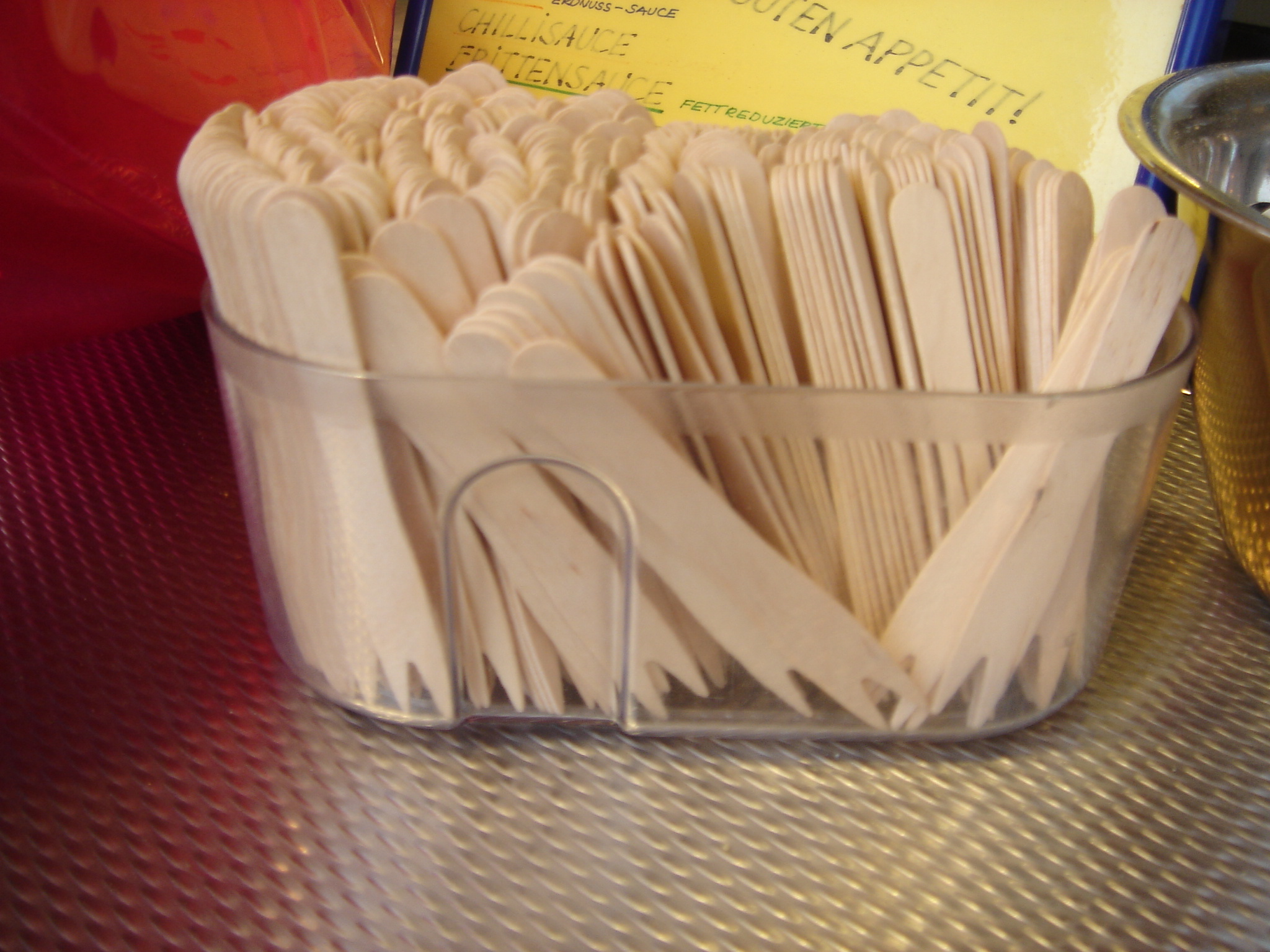
Two-pronged wooden chip forks

- Bread fork: A fork designed for serving bread from a basket or tray.
- Carving fork: A two-pronged fork used to hold meat steady while it is being carved. They are often sold with carving knives or slicers as part of a carving set.
- Chip fork: A two-pronged disposable fork, usually made of wood or plastic, designed for the eating of french fries (chips), currywurst and other greasy or sauce-covered takeaway foods. Chip forks range from 7.5 to 9 cm (3.0 to 3.5 in) long. In Germany they are called Pommesgabel (literally 'chip fork') or currywurst forks.
- Cocktail fork: A small fork resembling a trident, used for spearing cocktail garnishes such as olives.
- Crab fork: A short, sharp and narrow three-pronged or two-pronged fork designed to easily extract meat when consuming cooked crab.
- Dessert fork (alternatively, pudding fork/cake fork in British English): Any of several different special types of forks designed to eat desserts, such as a pastry fork. They usually have only three tines and are smaller than standard dinner forks. The leftmost tine may be widened so as to provide an edge with which to cut (though it is never sharpened).
- Dinner fork
- Fondue fork: A narrow fork, usually having two tines, long shaft and an insulating handle, typically of wood, for dipping bread into a pot containing sauce
- Ice cream fork: A spoon with flat tines used for some desserts. See spork.
- Fourchette à escargot: A snail fork, sometimes used with a pince à escargot in haute cuisine, to consume snails or escargot.
- Knork
- Lemon fork for the tea service
- Pickle fork: A long handled fork used for extracting pickles from a jar. The fork has an overall length of 5.5 to 8 inches (140 to 200 mm) and two or three narrow tines.
- Salad fork: Can be a shorter version of a regular fork, older versions have one of the outer tines made stronger, similar to the pastry fork, in order to cut lettuce. Often, a "salad fork" in the silverware service of some restaurants (especially chains) may be simply a second fork; conversely, some restaurants may omit it, offering only one fork in their service.
- Spaghetti fork: A novelty fork with a metal shaft loosely fitted inside a hollow plastic handle. The shaft protrudes through the top of the handle, ending in a crank, that allows the metal part of the fork to be easily rotated with one hand while the other hand is holding the plastic handle. This supposedly allows spaghetti to be easily wound onto the tines. Electric variations of this fork have become more prevalent in modern times.
- Sporf: A utensil combining characteristics of a spoon, a fork and a knife
- Spork: A utensil combining characteristics of a spoon and a fork.
- Sucket fork: A utensil with tines at one end of the stem and a spoon at the other. It was used to eat food that would otherwise be messy to eat such as items preserved in syrup. The tine end could spear the item, while the other end could be used to spoon the syrup.
- Terrapin fork: A specialized spoon-fork for eating terrapin dishes, a predecessor of the spork.
- Toasting fork: A fork, usually having two tines, very long metal shaft and sometimes an insulating handle, for toasting food over coals or an open flame.

== See also ==
- Fork etiquette
- Knife
- Spoon
- Spork
- Table setting
