= Lobster pick =

Specialized food utensil

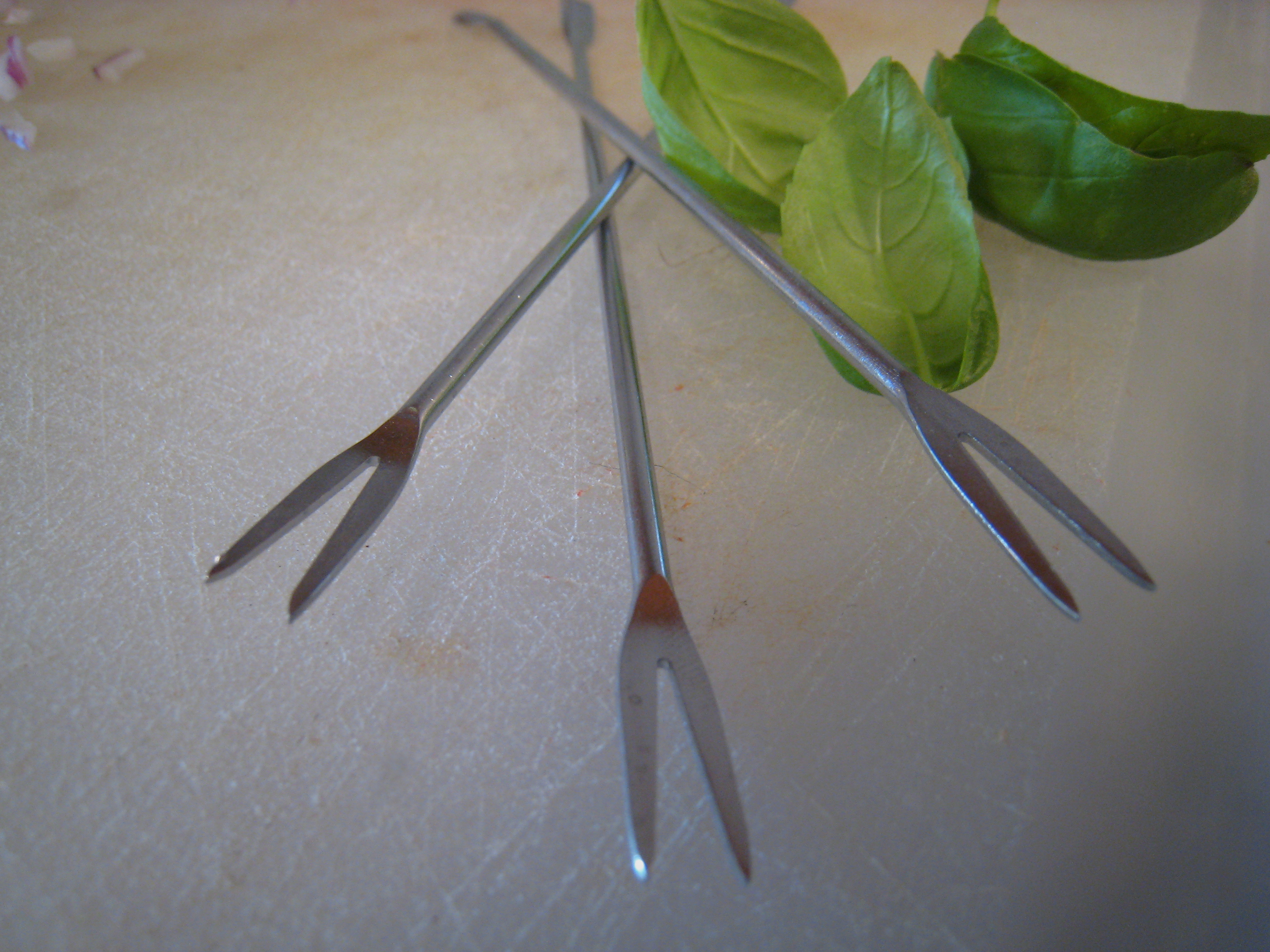
Three lobster forks

A lobster pick or lobster fork is a long, narrow food utensil used to extract meat from joints, legs, claws, and other small parts of a lobster. Lobster picks are usually made of stainless steel and weigh as much as an average teaspoon. They have a long, textured cylindrical handle, ending in a crescent-shaped moderately sharp pick, or else a small two-tined fork. A three-tined version has a longer central tine with two shorter side tines with hooks on them. The other end may have a spoon for scooping out meat from inside the lobster. The lobster pick can also be used with other seafood, such as crab and crawfish.

While using the fork, the lobster shell has to be secured in another hand, so these utensils cannot be used in formal dining, where only breads, cheese and sometimes fruits can be touched by fingers.
