= Anna Mangin =

Inventor and women's rights campaigner

Anna M. Mangin
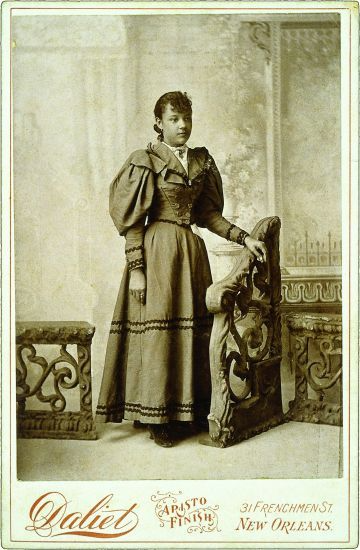
- Mangin, c. 1870
- Born: Anna Matilda Barker; October 1844; New Orleans, Louisiana
- Died: March 1, 1931 (aged 86); Danbury, Connecticut
- Other name: Annie Mattie Nahar
- Occupations: Inventor, Educator, Caterer, Businesswoman
- Years active: 1864-1907
- Known for: Patent for Pastry Fork
- Spouse: Andrew Fitch Mangin (1843-1907)
- Children: 1

Anna M. Mangin (October 1844 - March 1, 1931) was an American inventor, educator, and caterer. She invented a kitchen tool she called a pastry fork in 1891. This was different from the eating utensil also known as a pastry fork.

== Early life ==
It is believed that Anna M. Mangin was born Anna Matilda Barker in October 1844 in the state of Louisiana. On her 1877 marriage application, she listed her parents as Jacob Barker and P. [Polly?] Shelton. Jacob Barker was a prosperous planter, merchant and politician who was in his late sixties at the time of Annie's birth. Barker, a native of Maine, worked closely with Rhode Island merchant Rowland G. Hazard who, using Louisiana state laws, was able to free over one hundred Northern-born African-Americans who had been enslaved. It is possible that Annie arrived in Nantucket, Massachusetts through the ministrations of Barker, Hazard, and African-American minister, activist, orator and Underground Railroad conductor Charles Bennett Ray. It is known that Annie was taken in by Ray's sister, seamstress and business woman Elizabeth S. Ray and her husband, shoemaker and merchant Abraham M. Nahar, a native of Surinam. Annie was adopted by the childless couple and was known as Annie Mattie Nahar.

As Nantucket local historian Frances Karttunen observed:"[b]ack in 1845, entrepreneur Abraham Nahar and his seamstress wife Elizabeth had joined 102 other members of Nantucket’s New Guinea community in signing a petition to the Massachusetts legislature seeking relief from segregation of Nantucket’s public schools. The success of the struggle to integrate the island’s schools meant that Annie Mattie was educated along with white and non-white children at the South School on Orange Street. One of her contemporaries recalled that. 'To one unacquainted she would, unquestionably, have passed for a white girl, yet she was of African parentage, was true to and dwelt with colored people. She was a young woman of rare character and attractiveness.'"

== Career as educator ==
As the American Civil War commenced, Annie Nahar was a student at the Nantucket High School. Heeding the call of Nantucket native and Quaker activist Anna Gardner for teachers to go South to educate the freedmen, in June 1864, Annie left Nantucket for New Orleans, where she taught school for four years under the auspices of the Freedmen's Bureau, before moving to San Antonio, Texas

In 1870, Annie returned to New Orleans, where she took on the position of principal of the Coliseum School. By 1873, she had moved to lodgings at the corner of Napoleon avenue and Dryades street.

By 1877 Annie was the "principal of one of the McDonogh Schools that had been established from a bequest by a wealthy slave owner who left his estate for the support of free schools for children regardless of color" when she met Andrew Fitch Mangin, a thirty-four-year-old African-American native of Monroe, New York who was employed at various times as a coachman and a teamster. He was described as a man with "more than average natural shrewdness and intelligence."

On August 17, 1877, Andrew and Annie married in New Orleans and moved to New York City where Annie embarked on a new career as a cook and as a caterer while Andrew went into business with his brothers and operated a hauling and moving business from a yard on Gold Street in Manhattan On January 7, 1879, Annie gave birth to their only surviving child, a son she named for his father.

== Moves to Woodside, New York ==
Soon after the family's return to the North, Andrew Mangin bought a building lot on Fifth Street in the Winfield section of Woodside, New York in the county of Queens and after he built a small house on that lot he moved his family there. He continued transacting the freight business with his brothers until 1895, when he opened up a coal yard on that lot. Annie Mangin, along with her catering business, was also "teaching some of the colored children in Woodside."

== Major contribution ==
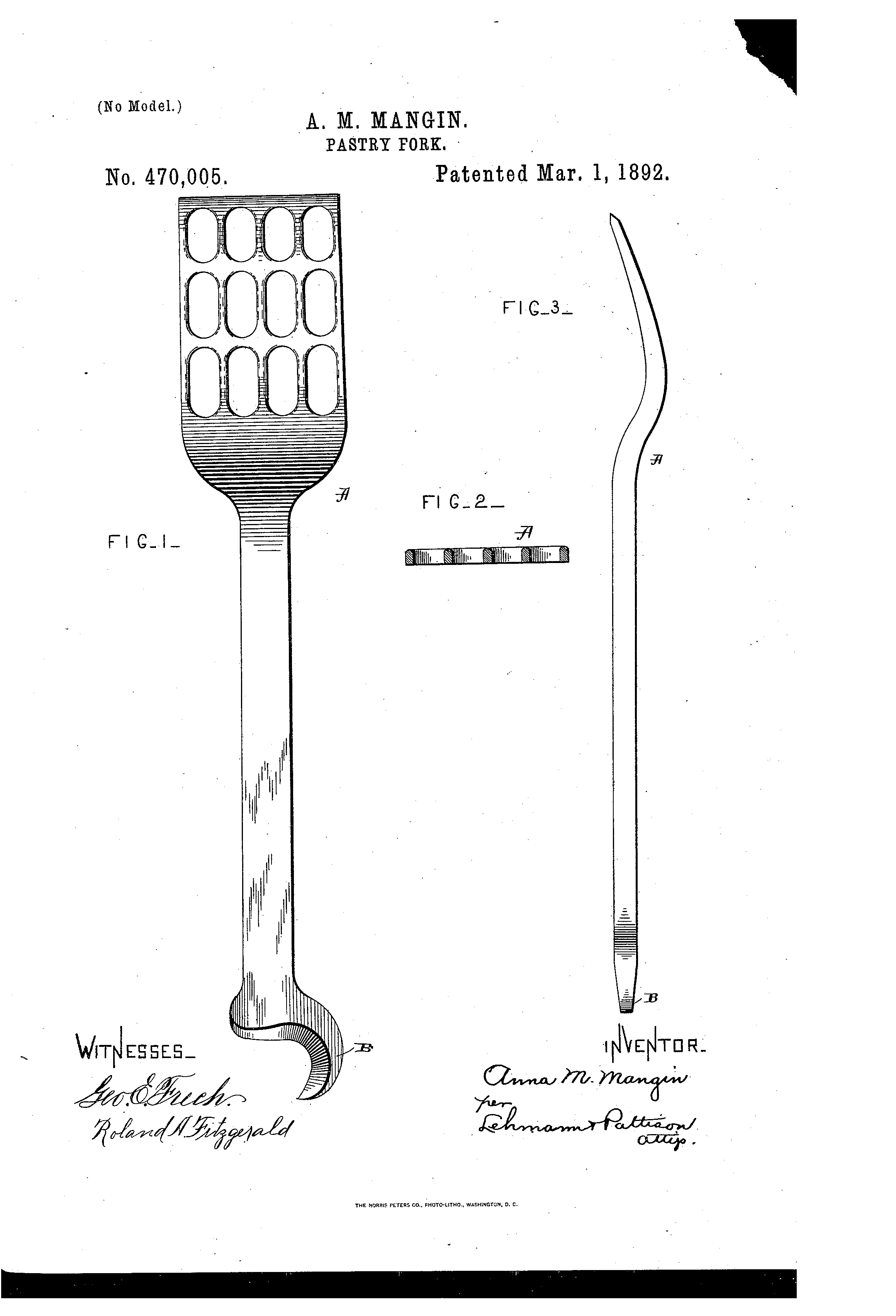
Pastry Fork patent drawing by Anna Mangin 1892

Anna M. Mangin made a major contribution to everyday domesticated household needs in the 19th century. Her invention was the pastry fork.

According to her husband Andrew Mangin, Anna first came up with the concept of a simplified manner of making pastry by an improvement to the pastry fork, and "then and there described it to him. The description was so clear and minute that Mr. Mangin often says, when speaking of the incident, 'I saw that fork just as plain as I see you now.' " Andrew Mangin went out to his tool shed and whittled a prototype of the fork out of yellow pine. Once Anna approved the model, Andrew had a more substantive model of the fork made, first from iron, and then from white metal. Anna Mangin received the patent for the pastry fork on March 1, 1892.

The pastry fork had many uses, including beating eggs, thickening foods, making drawn butter, mashing potatoes, making salad dressings, and most importantly, kneading pastry dough. "The curved piece at the upper end of the handle is what Mrs. Mangin calls the cutter or trimmer for pie crust." The pastry fork improved the lives of many people, and eventually led to more electric mixing inventions that are used to this day. Kneading pastry dough by hand is a grueling process that can cause arm cramping and other pains. Also, the dough often does not get fully incorporated when mixed by hand. If the dough does not fully incorporate during the kneading process, then it will not rise, resulting in a dense, and in most cases, underbaked consistency.

== Exhibition ==
Anna Mangin's pastry fork was displayed at the New York Afro-American Exhibit at the World's Columbian Exposition in 1893. The exhibit was located in the women's exhibit building on the second floor, where Mangin had a corner area to showcase the invention.

== Later years ==
Anna Mangin was active in community based activities. To take one example, in January 1907, she participated in a charity fair held on behalf of the Women's Loyal Union that supported the Industrial and Protective Union House for Working Girls in Brooklyn, New York. Mangin helped operate the Star Booth, chaired by librarian Florence T. Ray and staffed by a number of ladies including H. Cordelia Ray, Susan Elizabeth Frazier and Carrie Fortune, the wife of newspaper publisher Timothy Thomas Fortune.

After Andrew Mangin's death later in 1907, his widow and their son closed the coal yard but remained on the property until 1925 when Andrew Mangin Jr. purchased a chicken farm in Brookfield, Connecticut, and both mother and son moved there.

Anna Mangin died in a hospital in Danbury, Connecticut on Sunday, March 1, 1931 and was buried in the Mangin family plot in Evergreens Cemetery on Wednesday, the 4th.

- List of African-American inventors and scientists
- Timeline of United States inventions
