= Lemon fork =

Utensil for serving lemons

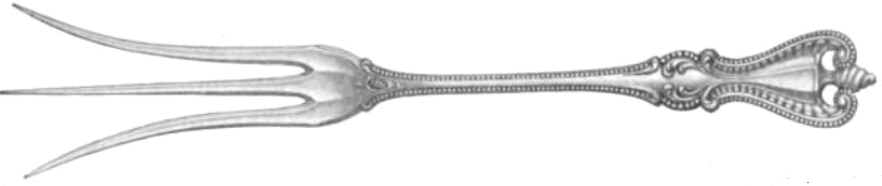
Lemon fork (Towle Silversmiths, 1908)

The lemon fork is a small (4+ inches long) serving utensil that is used to move lemon slices. Lemon forks have three long tines, with the outside tines splayed; ostensibly this arrangement helps to release more juice. Lemon forks became popular in the last quarter of the 19th century alongside other specialized utensils, such as asparagus tongs. One early 20th century cookbook called the lemon fork a "necessity" at the five o'clock tea party. While setting the table, the fork was placed over the slice of lemon. Unlike many specialized utensils of the 19th century, lemon forks are still being used in the 21st century, primarily in restaurants.

A lemon fork can double as a pickle fork and may be used to serve cucumber slices, olives, butter cubes and pats, smoked fish, and cheese cubes. One etiquette guide from 1966 stated that it is acceptable to use one's fingers to pick up lemon slices in the absence of a lemon fork.

== Sources ==
- Von Drachenfels, Susanne (2000). The Art of the Table: A Complete Guide to Table Setting, Table Manners, and Tableware. Simon & Schuster. ISBN 978-0-684-84732-0.
- Rhodes, S.R.; Hopkins, G.P. (1913). "Tea Table Tips". The Economy Administration Cook Book. W. B. Conkey Company.
- Rosiere, Gabrielle (1920). "Tea and Friends: Their Etiquette". Good Housekeeping (v. 70). International Magazine Company: 78–79.
- Beery, Mary (1966). Manners Made Easy. McGraw-Hill. ISBN 978-0-07-004306-0.
- Snodgrass, M.E. (2004). Encyclopedia of Kitchen History. Taylor & Francis. ISBN 978-1-135-45572-9.
- Condé Nast Publications Staff (1969). Vogue's Book of Etiquette and Good Manners. Condé Nast Publications. ISBN 978-0-671-20138-8.
