= Pastry fork =

Eating utensil

A right-handed pastry fork

A pastry fork, dessert fork, pie fork or cake fork is a fork designed for eating pastries and other desserts from a plate. The fork has three or four tines. The three-tine fork has a larger, flattened and beveled tine on the side while the four-tine fork had tines connected together with the bars ("barred") and beveled. The barred designs are mostly dated pre-1920.

Pastry forks range in size from 100 millimetres (4 in) (in English pastry fork sets) to 190 millimetres (7 1/2 in) as serving pieces in silverware (sterling and silver plate) place settings. In many fine place settings, the pastry fork and pie fork may be two separate forks as well.

It is typically designed so that it can be used with the right hand, while the left hand holds the plate. It therefore has the left side widened to be used like a knife to cut the food when pressed down on the plate. Left-handed pastry forks have the right side widened instead.

Pastry forks were part of the American "fanaticism for forks" in the late 19th century:

- etiquette books suggested avoiding the knife on pastry and cutting it with the edge of a fork instead since at least 1864;
- cheaper mass-produced forks had weaker tines, creating demand for new utensils capable of breaking through layers of food;
- Reed and Barton patented a "Cutting-Tined Fork" in 1869;
- thickened-tine forks were common since early 1880s.

Anna M. Mangin was awarded a patent on March 1, 1892, for a "pastry fork" intended to mix the pastry dough. The U.S. patent 470005A, despite its name, described a kitchen tool for mashing, and not the table pastry fork.

== Salad fork ==
The barred design of the dessert fork was also used for other products: for example, the Strasbourg pattern by Gorham Manufacturing Company the same shape was also used for fish and salad forks.

Individual salad fork can be a shorter (about 6 inches) version of a regular dinner fork, yet many versions of this fork, available since the 1880s and originally known as the lettuce fork, have one of the outer tines (sometimes both) made wider, similar to the pastry fork, in order to be strong enough to cut lettuce. Sometimes, there is also a bar connection between the neighboring tines.

Often, a "salad fork" in the silverware service of some restaurants (especially chains) may be simply a second fork; conversely, some restaurants may omit it, offering only one fork in their service.

The commonality between the salad and pastry forks was known to generate awkwardness,

... [from] the moment you can afford to buy a case of flat silver, Heaven help you if you mistake a pastry fork for a salad fork ...

— A 1925 etiquette book.

and create marketing opportunities: the manufacturers could (and did) designate the same utensil as either a salad or a pastry fork (or even a small fish fork).

The salad fork can be used for salads and pâté in both formal and informal dining settings.

== See also ==
- Cheese knife
- Knork
- Spork

== Sources ==
- Von Drachenfels, Susanne (2000). The Art of the Table: A Complete Guide to Table Setting, Table Manners, and Tableware. Simon & Schuster. ISBN 978-0-684-84732-0.
- Richardson, A.S. (1925). Standard Etiquette. Harper & brothers.
- Schollander, Wendell; Schollander, Wes (2002). Forgotten Elegance: The Art, Artifacts, and Peculiar History of Victorian and Edwardian Entertaining in America. Bloomsbury Academic. ISBN 978-0-313-31685-2.
- Young, Carolin C. (2013). "Silverware". In Smith, Andrew F. (ed.). The Oxford Encyclopedia of Food and Drink in America. New York, NY: Oxford University Press, USA. ISBN 978-0-19-973922-6.
