= Crab fork =

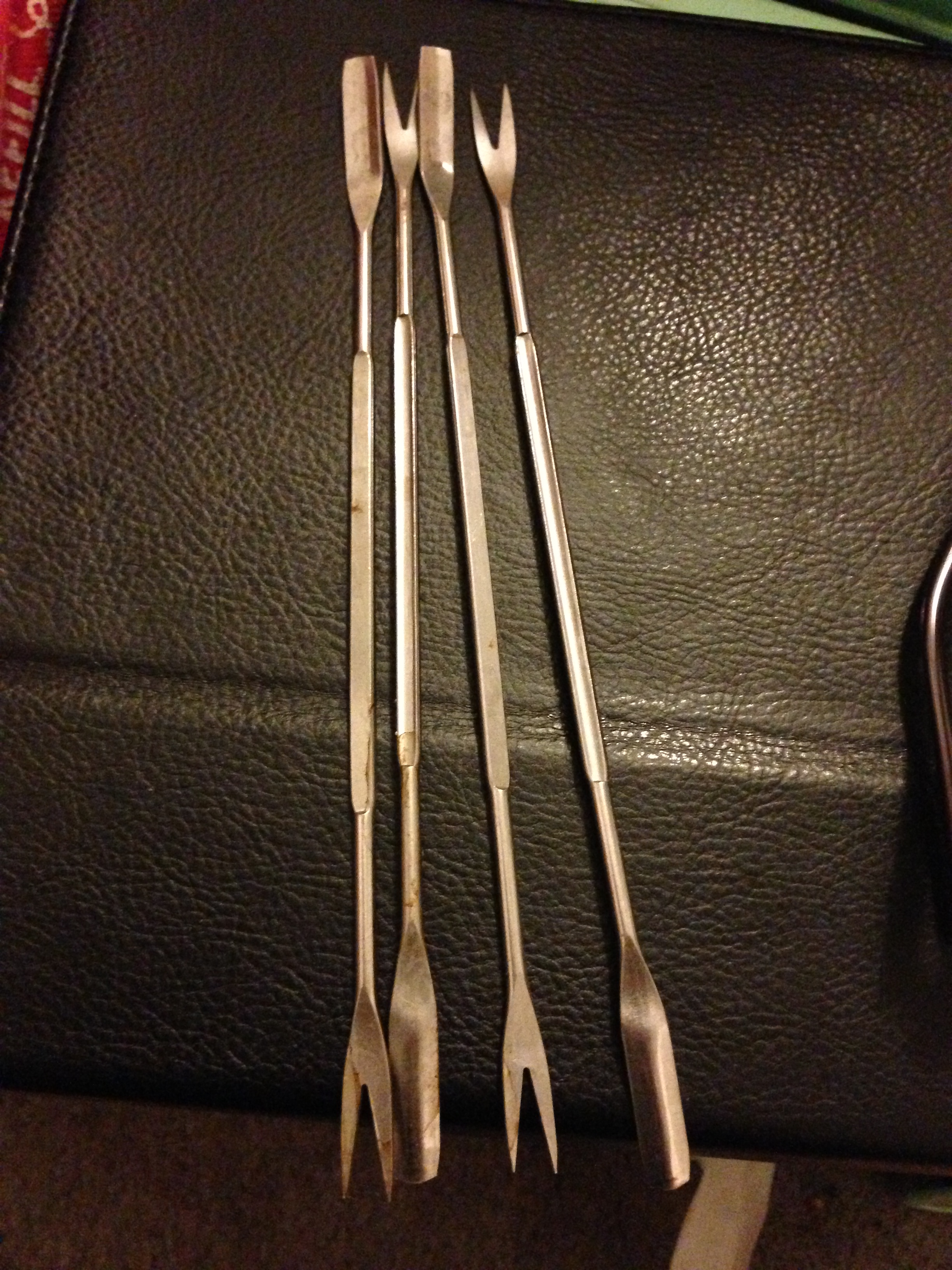
Crab forks

A crab fork (similar to, and sometimes synonymous with, a shrimp fork) is a small type of seafood fork designed for extracting flesh from a crab or lobster. These forks are typically long and narrow and are used for separating the meat of a crab or lobster from the shell. Crab forks may be special-purpose food utensils decorated or constructed specifically for crabs and lobsters, or may simply be very small forks sold or used for the purpose.
