= Kitchen utensil =

Tool used for food preparation

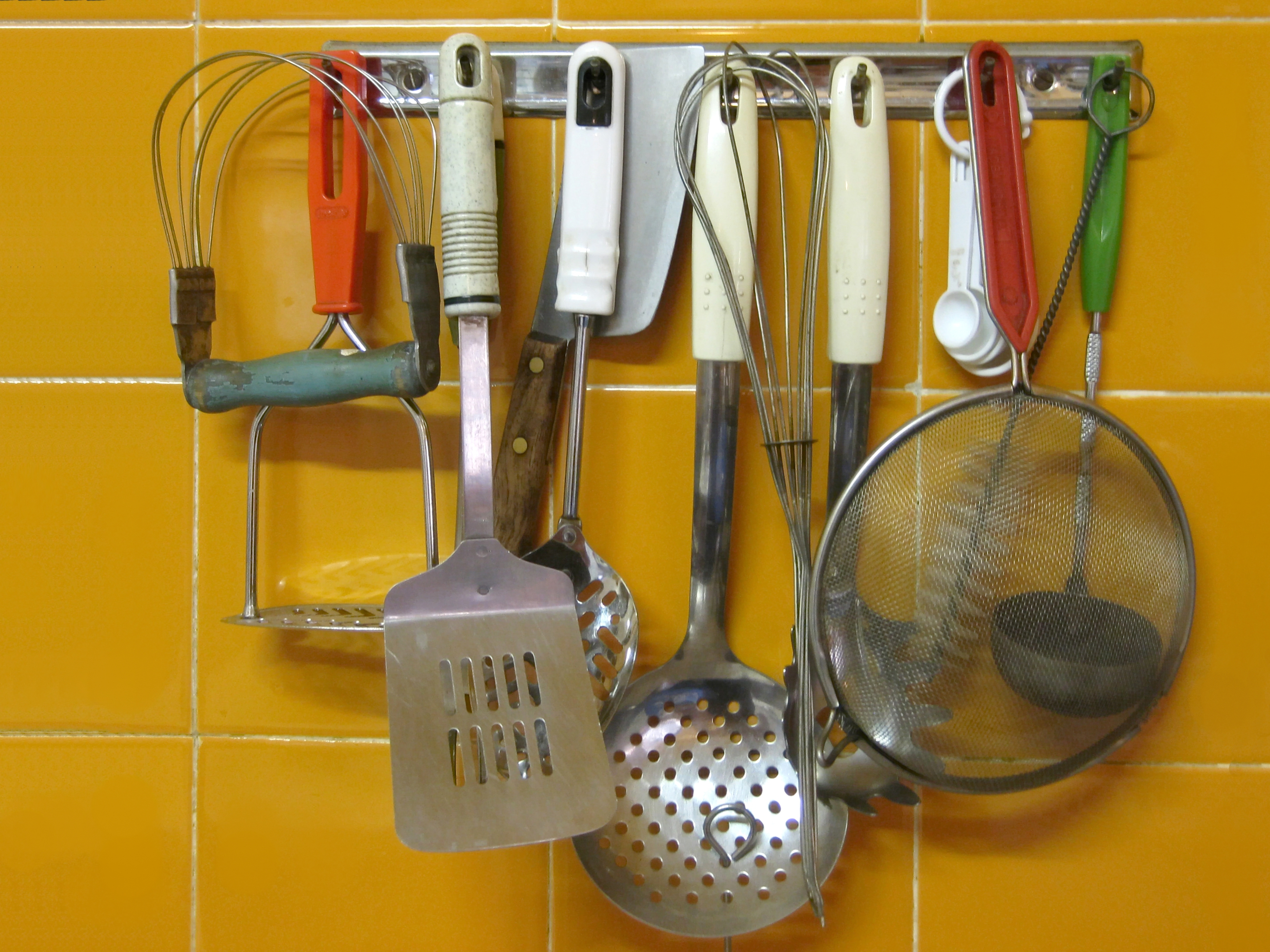
Various kitchen utensils on a kitchen hook strip. From left: – Pastry blender and potato masher – Spatula and (hidden) serving fork – Skimmer and chef's knife (small cleaver) – Whisk and slotted spoon – Spaghetti ladle – Sieve and measuring spoon set – Bottle brush and (spoon)

A kitchen utensil is a small hand-held tool used for food preparation. Common kitchen tasks include cutting food items to size, heating food on an open fire or on a stove, baking, grinding, mixing, blending, and measuring; different utensils are made for each task. A general purpose utensil such as a chef's knife may be used for a variety of foods; other kitchen utensils are highly specialized and may be used only in connection with preparation of a particular type of food, such as an egg separator or an apple corer. Some specialized utensils are used when an operation is to be repeated many times, or when the cook has limited dexterity or mobility. The number of utensils in a household kitchen varies with time and the style of cooking.

A cooking utensil is a utensil for cooking. Utensils may be categorized by use with terms derived from the word "ware": kitchenware, wares for the kitchen; ovenware and bakeware, kitchen utensils that are for use inside ovens and for baking; cookware, merchandise used for cooking; and so forth.

A partially overlapping category of tools is that of eating utensils, which are tools used for eating (cf. the more general category of tableware). Some utensils are both kitchen utensils and eating utensils. Cutlery (i.e. knives and other cutting implements) can be used for both food preparation in a kitchen and as eating utensils when dining. Other cutlery such as forks and spoons are both kitchen and eating utensils.

Other names used for various types of kitchen utensils, although not strictly denoting a utensil that is specific to the kitchen, are according to the materials they are made of, again using the "-ware" suffix, rather than their functions: earthenware, utensils made of clay; silverware, utensils (both kitchen and dining) made of silver; glassware, utensils (both kitchen and dining) made of glass; and so forth. These latter categorizations include utensils—made of glass, silver, clay, and so forth—that are not necessarily kitchen utensils.

== Materials ==
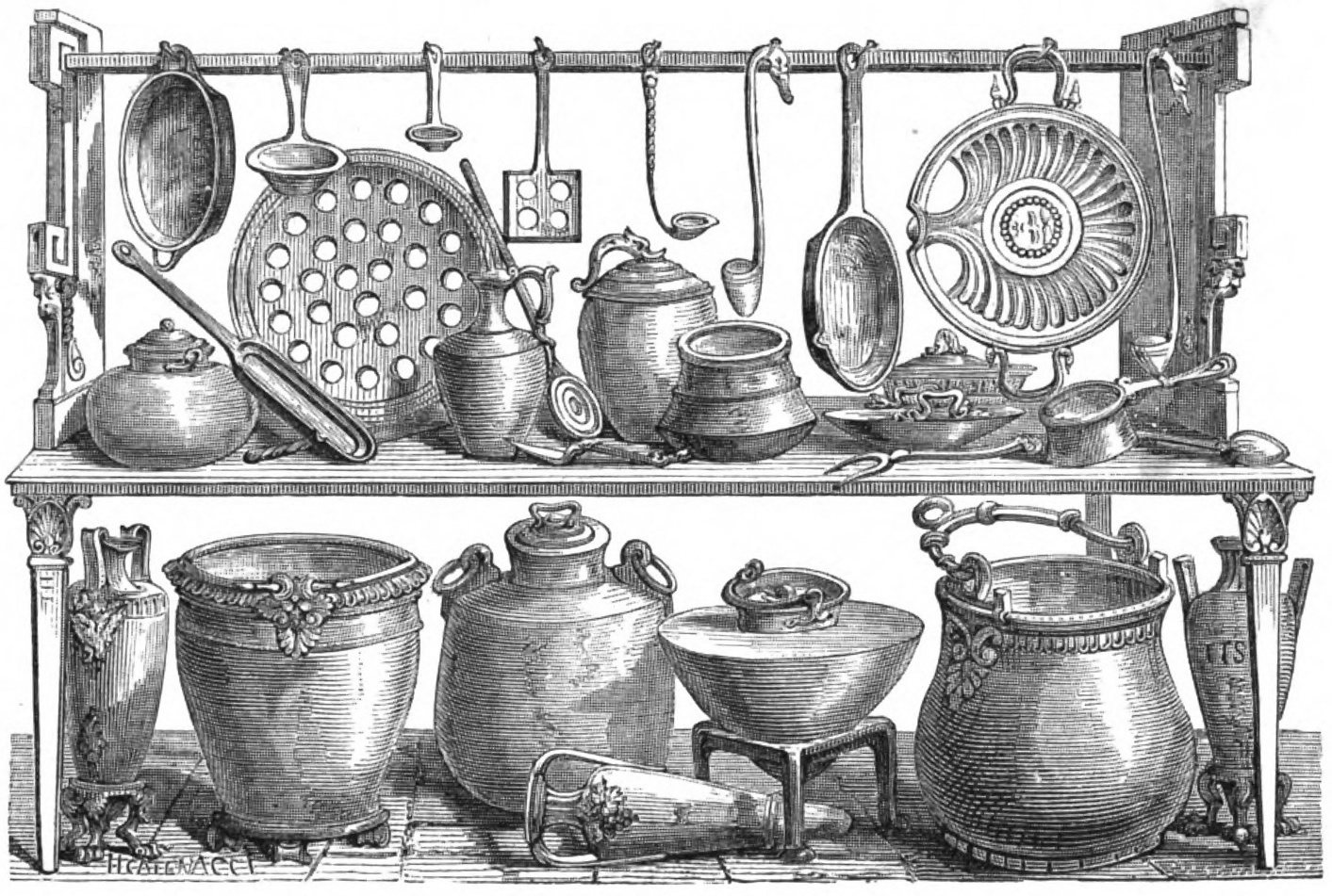
Kitchen utensils in bronze discovered in Pompeii. Illustration by Hercule Catenacci in 1864

Benjamin Thompson noted at the start of the 19th century that kitchen utensils were commonly made of copper, with various efforts made to prevent the copper from reacting with food (particularly its acidic contents) at the temperatures used for cooking, including tinning, enamelling, and varnishing. He observed that iron had been used as a substitute, and that some utensils were made of earthenware. By the turn of the 20th century, Maria Parloa noted that kitchen utensils were made of (tinned or enamelled) iron and steel, copper, nickel, silver, tin, clay, earthenware, and aluminium. The latter, aluminium, became a popular material for kitchen utensils in the 20th century.

=== Copper ===
Copper has good thermal conductivity and copper utensils are both durable and attractive in appearance. However, they are also comparatively heavier than utensils made of other materials, require scrupulous cleaning to remove poisonous tarnish compounds, and are not suitable for acidic foods. Copper pots are lined with tin to prevent discoloration or altering the taste of food. The tin lining must be periodically restored, and protected from overheating.

=== Iron ===
Iron is more prone to rusting than (tinned) copper. Cast iron kitchen utensils are less prone to rust by avoiding abrasive scouring and extended soaking in water in order to build up its layer of seasoning. For some iron kitchen utensils, water is a particular problem, since it is very difficult to dry them fully. In particular, iron egg-beaters or ice cream freezers are tricky to dry, and the consequent rust if left wet will roughen them and possibly clog them completely. When storing iron utensils for long periods, van Rensselaer recommended coating them in non-salted (since salt is also an ionic compound) fat or paraffin.

Iron utensils have little problem with high cooking temperatures, are simple to clean as they become smooth with long use, are durable and comparatively strong (i.e. not as prone to breaking as, say, earthenware), and hold heat well. However, as noted, they rust comparatively easily.

=== Stainless steel ===
Stainless steel finds many applications in the manufacture of kitchen utensils. Stainless steel is considerably less likely to rust in contact with water or food products, and so reduces the effort required to maintain utensils in clean useful condition. Cutting tools made with stainless steel maintain a usable edge while not presenting the risk of rust found with iron or other types of steel.

=== Earthenware and enamelware ===
Earthenware utensils suffer from brittleness when subjected to rapid large changes in temperature, as commonly occur in cooking, and the glazing of earthenware often contains lead, which is poisonous. Thompson noted that as a consequence of this the use of such glazed earthenware was prohibited by law in some countries from use in cooking, or even from use for storing acidic foods. Van Rensselaer proposed in 1919 that one test for lead content in earthenware was to let a beaten egg stand in the utensil for a few minutes and watch to see whether it became discoloured, which is a sign that lead might be present.

In addition to their problems with thermal shock, enamelware utensils require careful handling, as careful as for glassware, because they are prone to chipping. But enamel utensils are not affected by acidic foods, are durable, and are easily cleaned. However, they cannot be used with strong alkalis.

Earthenware, porcelain, and pottery utensils can be used for both cooking and serving food, and so thereby save on washing-up of two separate sets of utensils. They are durable, and (van Rensselaer notes) "excellent for slow, even cooking in even heat, such as slow baking". However, they are comparatively unsuitable for cooking using a direct heat, such as a cooking over a flame.

=== Aluminium ===
James Frank Breazeale in 1918 opined that aluminium "is without doubt the best material for kitchen utensils", noting that it is "as far superior to enamelled ware as enamelled ware is to the old-time iron or tin". He qualified his recommendation for replacing worn-out tin or enamelled utensils with aluminium ones by noting that "old-fashioned black iron frying pans and muffin rings, polished on the inside or worn smooth by long usage, are, however, superior to aluminium ones".

Aluminium's advantages over other materials for kitchen utensils is its good thermal conductivity (which is approximately an order of magnitude greater than that of steel), the fact that it is largely non-reactive with foodstuffs at low and high temperatures, its low toxicity, and the fact that its corrosion products are white and so (unlike the dark corrosion products of, say, iron) do not discolour food that they happen to be mixed into during cooking. However, its disadvantages are that it is easily discoloured, can be dissolved by acidic foods (to a comparatively small extent), and reacts to alkaline soaps if they are used for cleaning a utensil.

In the European Union, the construction of kitchen utensils made of aluminium is determined by two European standards: EN 601 (Aluminium and aluminium alloys — Castings — Chemical composition of castings for use in contact with foodstuffs) and EN 602 (Aluminium and aluminium alloys — Wrought products — Chemical composition of semi-finished products used for the fabrication of articles for use in contact with foodstuffs).

=== Plastics ===
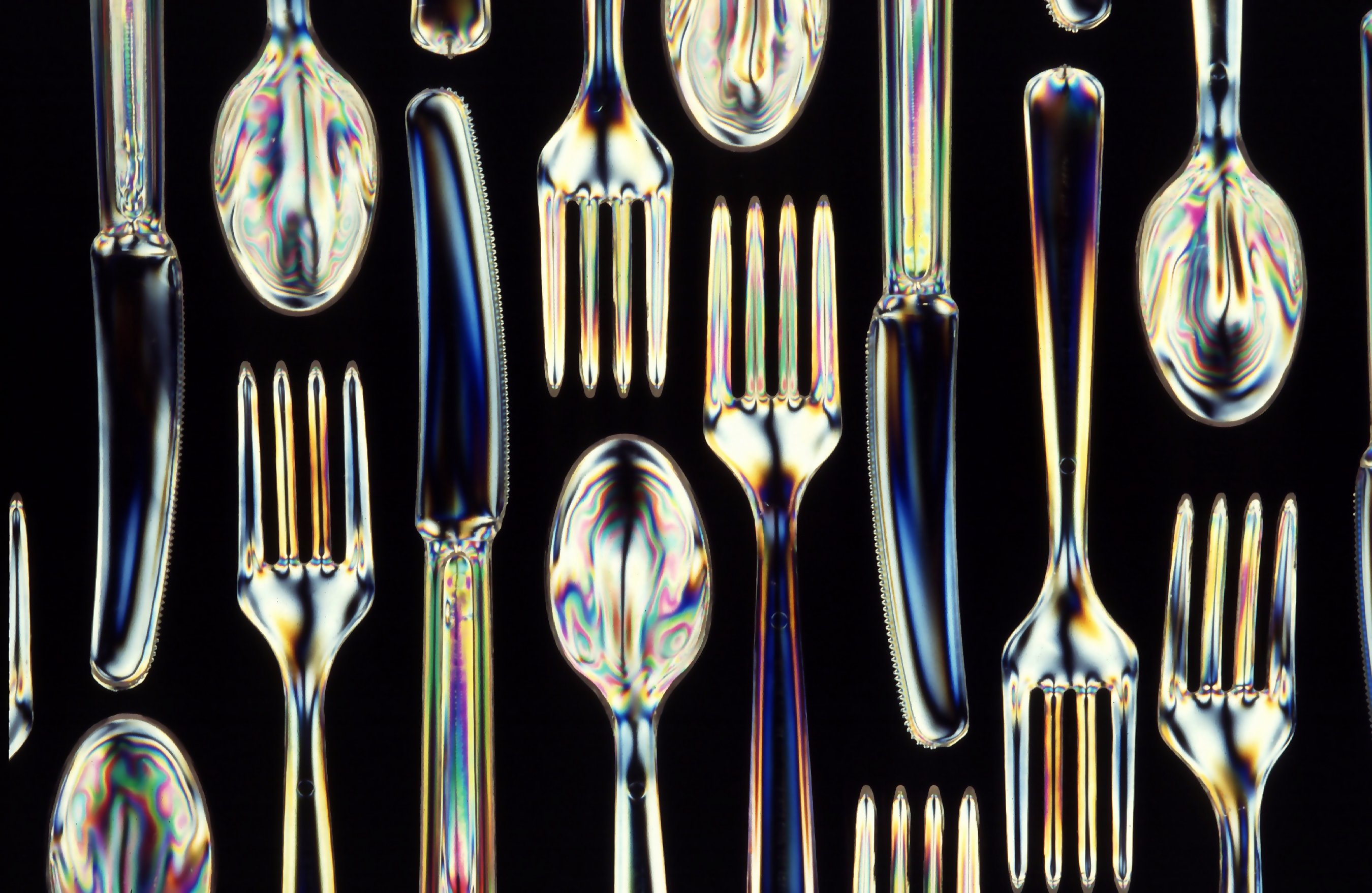
Biodegradable plastic utensils made from bioplastic

Plastics can be readily formed by molding into a variety of shapes useful for kitchen utensils. Transparent plastic measuring cups allow ingredient levels to be easily visible, and are lighter and less fragile than glass measuring cups. Plastic handles added to utensils improve comfort and grip. While many plastics deform or decompose if heated, a few silicone products can be used in boiling water or in an oven for food preparation. Non-stick plastic coatings can be applied to frying pans; newer coatings avoid the issues with decomposition of plastics under strong heating.

=== Glass ===
Heat-resistant glass utensils can be used for baking or other cooking. Glass does not conduct heat as well as metal, and has the drawback of breaking easily if dropped. Transparent glass measuring cups allow ready measurement of liquid and dry ingredients.

== Diversity and utility ==
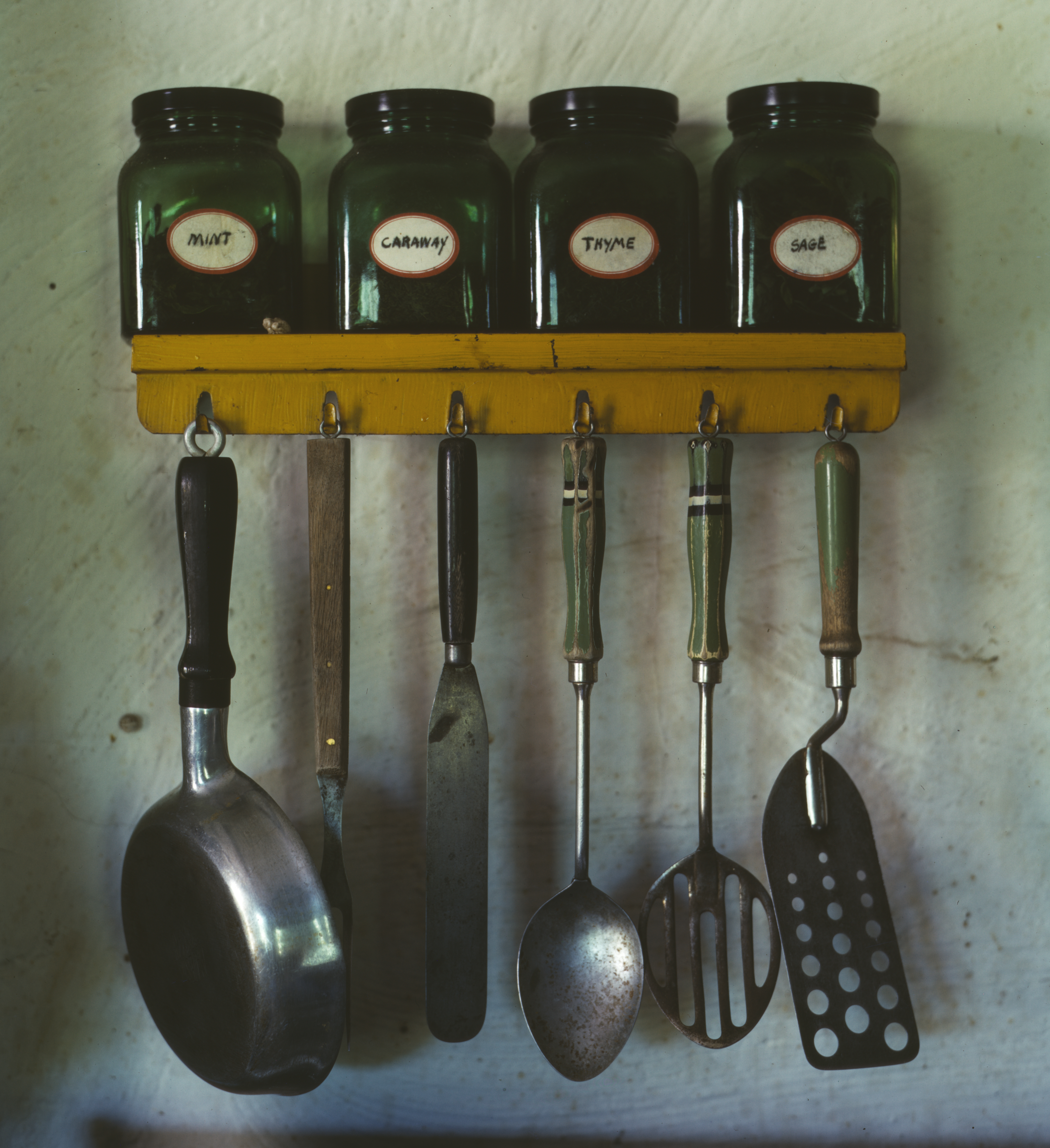
Various kitchen utensils. At top: a spice rack with jars of mint, caraway, thyme, and sage. Lower: hanging from hooks; a small pan, a meat fork, an icing spatula, a whole spoon, a slotted spoon, and a perforated spatula. Photograph by Arthur Siegel, taken in 1942.

=== Before the 19th century ===
"Of the culinary utensils of the ancients", wrote Mrs Beeton, "our knowledge is very limited; but as the art of living, in every civilized country, is pretty much the same, the instruments for cooking must, in a great degree, bear a striking resemblance to one another".

Archaeologists and historians have studied the kitchen utensils used in centuries past. For example: In the Middle Eastern villages and towns of the middle first millennium AD, historical and archaeological sources record that Jewish households generally had stone measuring cups, a meyḥam (a wide-necked vessel for heating water), a kederah (an unlidded pot-bellied cooking pot), a ilpas (a lidded stewpot/casserole pot type of vessel used for stewing and steaming), yorah and kumkum (pots for heating water), two types of teganon (frying pan) for deep and shallow frying, an iskutla (a glass serving platter), a tamḥui (ceramic serving bowl), a keara (a bowl for bread), a kiton (a canteen of cold water used to dilute wine), and a lagin (a wine decanter).

Ownership and types of kitchen utensils varied from household to household. Records survive of inventories of kitchen utensils from London in the 14th century, in particular the records of possessions given in the coroner's rolls. Very few such people owned any kitchen utensils at all. In fact only seven convicted felons are recorded as having any. One such, a murderer from 1339, is recorded as possessing only the one kitchen utensil: a brass pot (one of the commonest such kitchen utensils listed in the records) valued at three shillings. Similarly, in Minnesota in the second half of the 19th century, John North is recorded as having himself made "a real nice rolling pin, and a pudding stick" for his wife; one soldier is recorded as having a Civil War bayonet refashioned, by a blacksmith, into a bread knife; whereas an immigrant Swedish family is recorded as having brought with them "solid silver knives, forks, and spoons [...] Quantities of copper and brass utensils burnished until they were like mirrors hung in rows".

=== 19th century growth ===
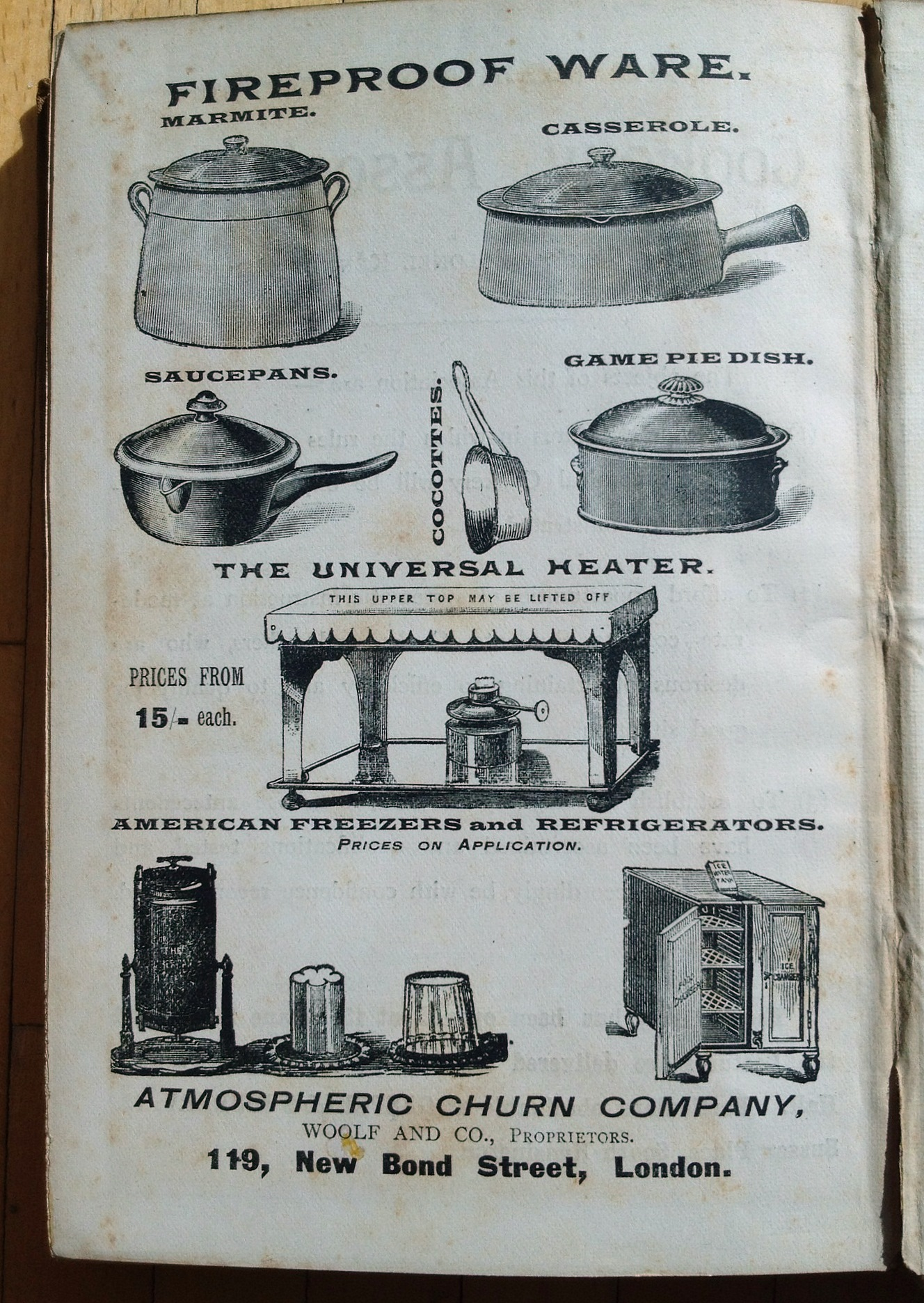
The up-to-date kitchen fireproof ware in 1894

The 19th century, particularly in the United States, saw an explosion in the number of kitchen utensils available on the market, with many labour-saving devices being invented and patented throughout the century. Maria Parloa's Cook Book and Marketing Guide listed a minimum of 139 kitchen utensils without which a contemporary kitchen would not be considered properly furnished. Parloa wrote that "the homemaker will find [that] there is continually something new to be bought".

A growth in the range of kitchen utensils available can be traced through the growth in the range of utensils recommended to the aspiring householder in cookbooks as the century progressed. Earlier in the century, in 1828, Frances Byerley Parkes (Parkes 1828) had recommended a smaller array of utensils. By 1858, Elizabeth H. Putnam, in Mrs Putnam's Receipt Book and Young Housekeeper's Assistant, wrote with the assumption that her readers would have the "usual quantity of utensils", to which she added a list of necessary items:

Copper saucepans, well lined, with covers, from three to six different sizes; a flat-bottomed soup-pot; an upright gridiron; sheet-iron breadpans instead of tin; a griddle; a tin kitchen; Hector's double boiler; a tin coffee-pot for boiling coffee, or a filter — either being equally good; a tin canister to keep roasted and ground coffee in; a canister for tea; a covered tin box for bread; one likewise for cake, or a drawer in your store-closet, lined with zinc or tin; a bread-knife; a board to cut bread upon; a covered jar for pieces of bread, and one for fine crumbs; a knife-tray; a spoon-tray; — the yellow ware is much the stringest, or tin pans of different sizes are economical; — a stout tin pan for mixing bread; a large earthen bowl for beating cake; a stone jug for yeast; a stone jar for soup stock; a meat-saw; a cleaver; iron and wooden spoons; a wire sieve for sifting flour and meal; a small hair sieve; a bread-board; a meat-board; a lignum vitae mortar, and rolling-pin, &c.

— Putnam 1858, p. 318

Mrs Beeton, in her Book of Household Management, wrote:

The following list, supplied by Messrs Richard & John Slack, 336, Strand, will show the articles required for the kitchen of a family in the middle class of life, although it does not contain all the things that may be deemed necessary for some families, and may contain more than are required for others. As Messrs Slack themselves, however, publish a useful illustrated catalogue, which may be had at their establishment gratis, and which it will be found advantageous to consult by those about to furnish, it supersedes the necessity of our enlarging that which we give:

1 Tea-kettle	6s. 6d.	1 Colander	1s. 6d.	1 Flour-box	1s. 0d.
1 Toasting fork	1s. 0d.	3 Block-tin saucepans		3 Flat-irons	3s. 6d.
1 Bread-grater	1s. 0d.		5s. 9d.	2 Frying-pans	4s. 0d.
1 Pair of Brass		5 Iron Saucepans	12s. 0d.	1 Gridiron	2s. 0d.
Candlesticks	3s. 6d.	1 Ditto and Steamer		1 Mustard-pot	1s. 0d.
1 Teapot and Tray	6s. 6d.		6s. 6d.	1 Salt-cellar	8d.
1 Bottle-jack	9s. 9d.	1 Large Boiling-pot		1 Pepper box	6d.
6 Spoons	1s. 6d.		10s. 0d.	1 Pair of Bellows	2s. 0d.
2 Candlesticks	2s. 6d.	4 Iron Stewpans	8s. 9d.	3 Jelly-moulds	8s. 0d.
1 Candle-box	1s. 4d.	1 Dripping-pan and		1 Plate-basket	5s. 6d.
6 Knives & Forks	5s. 3d.	Stand	6s. 6d.	1 Cheese-toaster	1s. 10d.
2 Sets of Skewers	1s. 0s.	1 Dustpan	1s. 0d.	1 Coal-shovel	2s. 6d.
1 Meat-chopper	1s. 9d.	1 Fish and Egg-slice		1 Wood Meat-screen	
1 Cinder-sifter	1s. 3d.		1s. 9d.		30s. 0d.
1 Coffee-pot	2s. 3d.	2 Fish-kettles	10s. 0d.		
				The Set	£8 11s. 1d.

— Isabella Mary Beeton, The Book of Household Management

Parloa, in her 1880 cookbook, took two pages to list all of the essential kitchen utensils for a well-furnished kitchen, a list running to 93 distinct sorts of item. The 1882 edition ran to 20 pages illustrating and describing the various utensils for a well-furnished kitchen. Sarah Tyson Rorer's 1886 Philadelphia Cook Book (Rorer 1886) listed more than 200 kitchen utensils that a well-furnished kitchen should have.

=== "Labour-saving" utensils generating more labour ===
However, many of these utensils were expensive and not affordable by the majority of householders. Some people considered them unnecessary, too. James Frank Breazeale decried the explosion in patented "labour-saving" devices for the modern kitchen—promoted in exhibitions and advertised in "Household Guides" at the start of the 20th century—, saying that "the best way for the housewife to peel a potato, for example, is in the old-fashioned way, with a knife, and not with a patented potato peeler". Breazeale advocated simplicity over dishwashing machines "that would have done credit to a moderate sized hotel", and noted that the most useful kitchen utensils were "the simple little inexpensive conveniences that work themselves into every day use", giving examples, of utensils that were simple and cheap but indispensable once obtained and used, of a stiff brush for cleaning saucepans, a sink strainer to prevent drains from clogging, and an ordinary wooden spoon.

The "labour-saving" devices did not necessarily save labour, either. While the advent of mass-produced standardized measuring instruments permitted even householders with little to no cooking skills to follow recipes and end up with the desired result and the advent of many utensils enabled "modern" cooking, on a stove or range rather than at floor level with a hearth, they also operated to raise expectations of what families would eat. So while food was easier to prepare and to cook, ordinary householders at the same time were expected to prepare and to cook more complex and harder-to-prepare meals on a regular basis. The labour-saving effect of the tools was cancelled out by the increased labour required for what came to be expected as the culinary norm in the average household.

== See also ==
- Kitchenware, list of such wares
- Cookware and bakeware
- Gastronorm, a European size standard for kitchenware
- List of eating utensils
- List of food preparation utensils
- List of Japanese cooking utensils
