= Deep frying =

Method of cooking food under hot fat

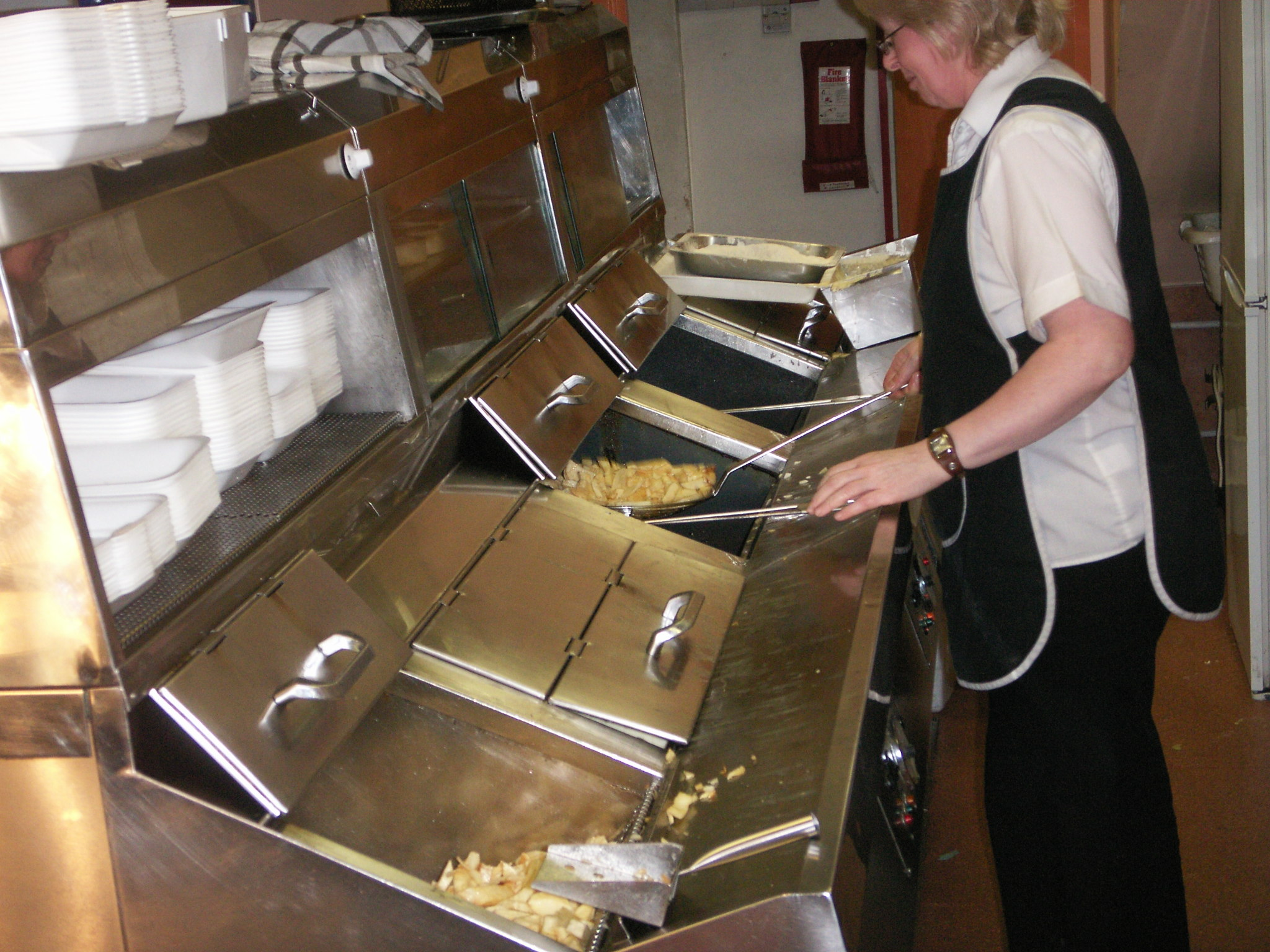
A chef deep frying fish and chips

Deep frying (sometimes referred to as deep fat frying) is a cooking method in which food is submerged in hot fat, traditionally lard but today most commonly oil, as opposed to the shallow frying used in conventional frying done in a frying pan. Normally, a deep fryer or chip pan is used for this; industrially, a pressure fryer or vacuum fryer may be used. Deep frying may also be performed using oil that is heated in a pot. Deep frying is classified as a hot-fat cooking method. Typically, deep frying foods cook quickly since oil has a high rate of heat conduction and all sides of the food are cooked simultaneously.

The term "deep frying" and many modern deep-fried foods were not invented until the 19th century, but the practice has been around for millennia. Early records and cookbooks suggest that the practice began in certain European countries before other countries adopted the practice.

Deep frying is popular worldwide, with deep-fried foods accounting for a large portion of global caloric consumption.

== History ==
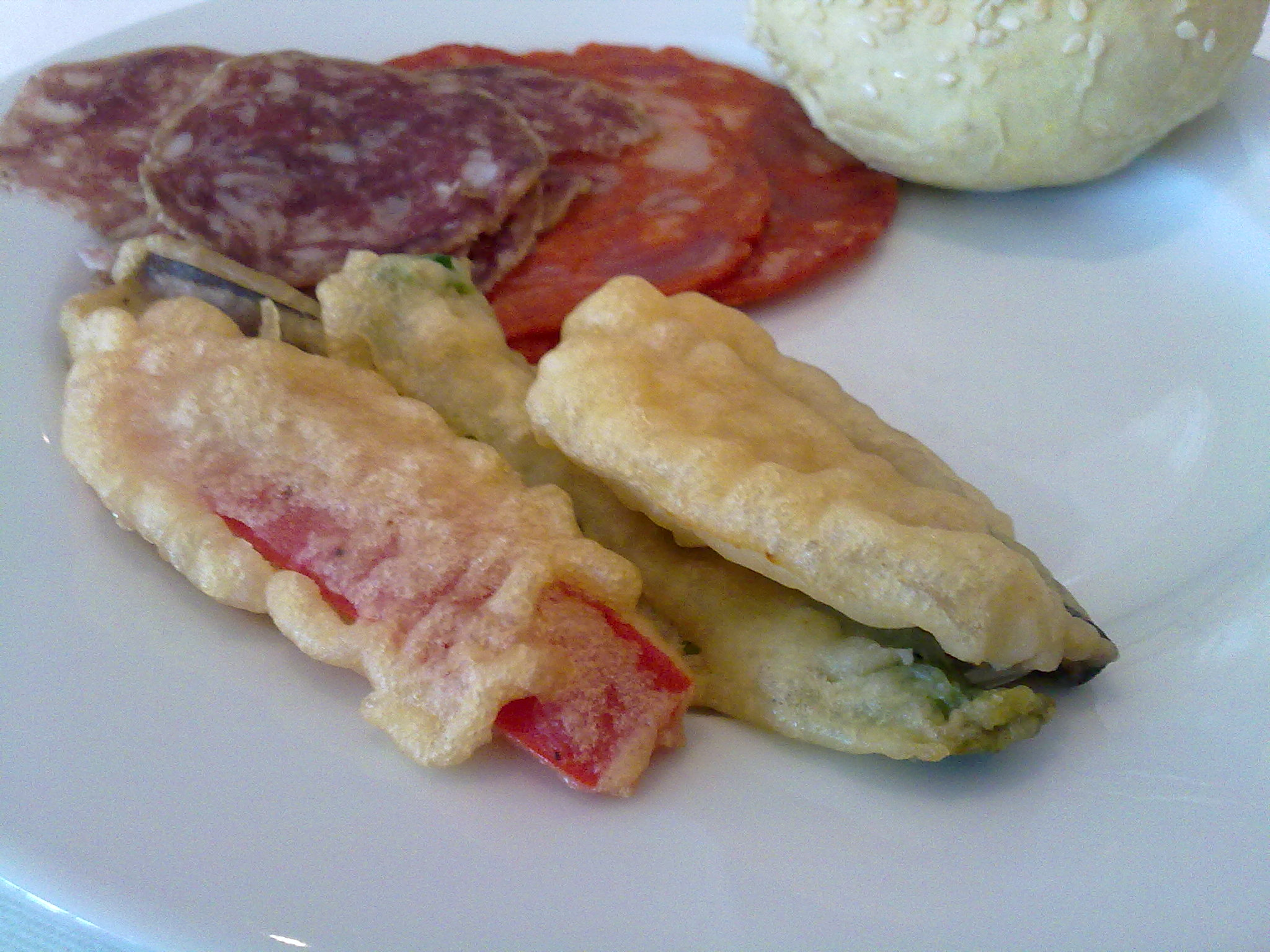
Peixinhos da horta, the Portuguese ancestor of Japanese tempura

The English term deep-fried is attested from the early 20th century.

Deep-fried dough was eaten as early as the late 2nd millennium BC in Canaan. Frying food in olive oil is attested in Classical Greece from about the 5th century BC. The 5th century AD Roman cookbook Apicius (De Re Coquinaria) offers a recipe for deep fried chicken in a cream sauce "Pullus leucozomus" fried in olive oil. Sanskrit texts such as the 12th century Manasollasa (Bhartur Upabhogakāraṇa) mention snacks like malpua and vataka being submerged and fried in ghee. Deep-fried foods such as funnel cakes arrived in northern Europe by the 13th century, and deep-fried fish recipes have been found in cookbooks in Spain and Portugal at around the same time.

French fries, invented in the early 17th century in Chile, became popular in the early 19th century western Europe. In 1860, Joseph Malin combined deep fried fish with chips (french fries) to open the first fish and chip shop in London.

Modern deep frying in the United States began in the 19th century with the growing popularity of cast iron, particularly around the American South which led to the development of many modern deep-fried dishes. Doughnuts were invented in the mid-18th century, with foods such as onion rings, deep-fried turkey, and corn dogs all being invented in the early 20th century. In recent years, the growth of fast food has expanded the reach of deep-fried foods, especially french fries.

== Technique ==
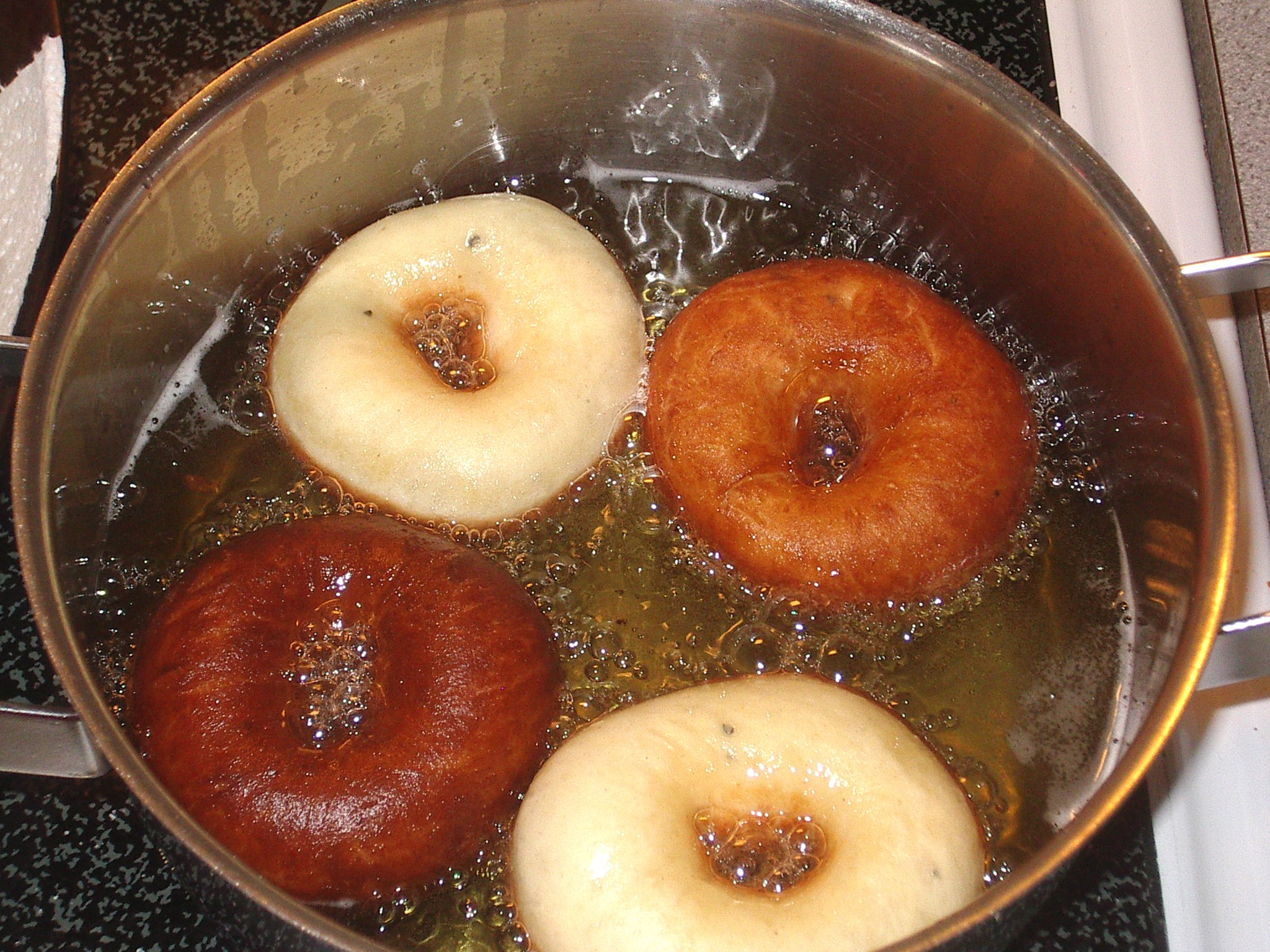
Smultring being deep-fried

Deep frying food is defined as a process where food is submerged in hot oil at temperatures typically between 350 °F (177 °C) and 375 °F (191 °C), but deep frying oil can reach temperatures of over 400 °F (205 °C). One common method for preparing food for deep frying involves adding multiple layers of batter around the food, such as cornmeal, flour, or tempura; breadcrumbs may also be used.

While most foods need batter coatings for protection, it is not as necessary for cooked noodles and potatoes because their high starch content enables them to hold more moisture and not shrink. Foods such as French fries can be battered if extra crispiness is desired. Meats are sometimes partially cooked before deep frying to ensure that they are done inside while keeping their juiciness.

When performed properly, deep frying does not make food excessively greasy, because the moisture in the food repels the oil. The hot oil heats the water within the food, steaming it; oil cannot go against the direction of this powerful flow because (due to its high temperature) the water vapor pushes the bubbles toward the surface. As long as the oil is hot enough and the food is not immersed in the oil for too long, oil penetration will be confined to the outer surface. Foods deep-fried at proper temperatures typically absorb less than 2 tbsp (30 mL) per 2.5 cups (~600 mL) of oil used. This oil absorption rate is around the same as occurs with shallow frying, such as in a pan.

However, if the food is cooked in the oil for too long, much of the water will be lost and the oil will begin to penetrate the food. The correct frying temperature depends on the thickness and type of food, but in most cases it lies between 350–375 °F (177–191 °C). An informal test for a temperature close to this range involves adding a tiny amount of flour into the oil and watching to see if it sizzles without immediately burning. A second test involves adding one piece of food to deep fry and watching it sink somewhat and rise back up. Sinking without resurfacing indicates that the oil is too cold; not sinking at all indicates that the oil is too hot.

It is recommended that deep fryers be cleaned often to prevent contamination. The process of cooking with oil can also contaminate nearby surfaces as oil may splatter on adjacent areas. Oil vapors can also condense on more distant surfaces such as walls and ceilings. Supplies such as dish detergent and baking soda can effectively clean affected surfaces.

== Tools ==
Deep frying is done with a deep fryer, a pan such as a wok or chip pan, a Dutch oven, or a cast-iron pot. Additional tools include fry baskets, which are used to contain foods in a deep fryer and to strain foods when removed from the oil, and cooking thermometers, used to gauge oil temperature. Tongs, slotted spoons, wooden spoons, and sieves may be used to remove or separate foods from the hot oil.

Japanese deep frying tools include long metal chopsticks; the agemono-nabe deep frying pot, which is heavy for retaining heat and deep for holding oil; the ami-shakushi net ladle used for scooping out batter debris; and the abura-kiri oil drying rack pan.

Deep frying tools

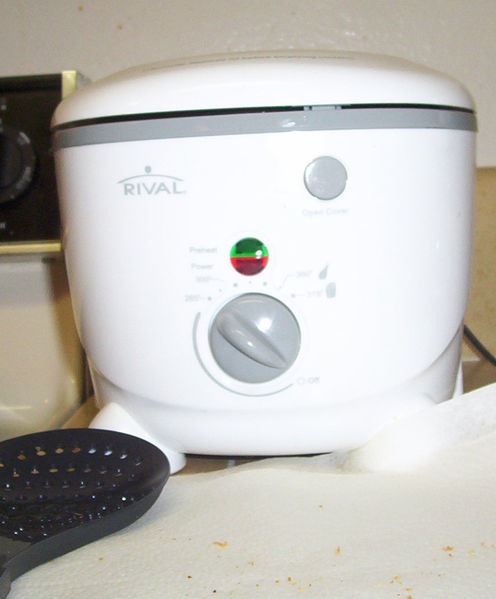
A deep fryer with slotted spoon, for removing foods from the hot oil

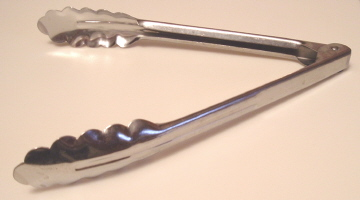
Tongs

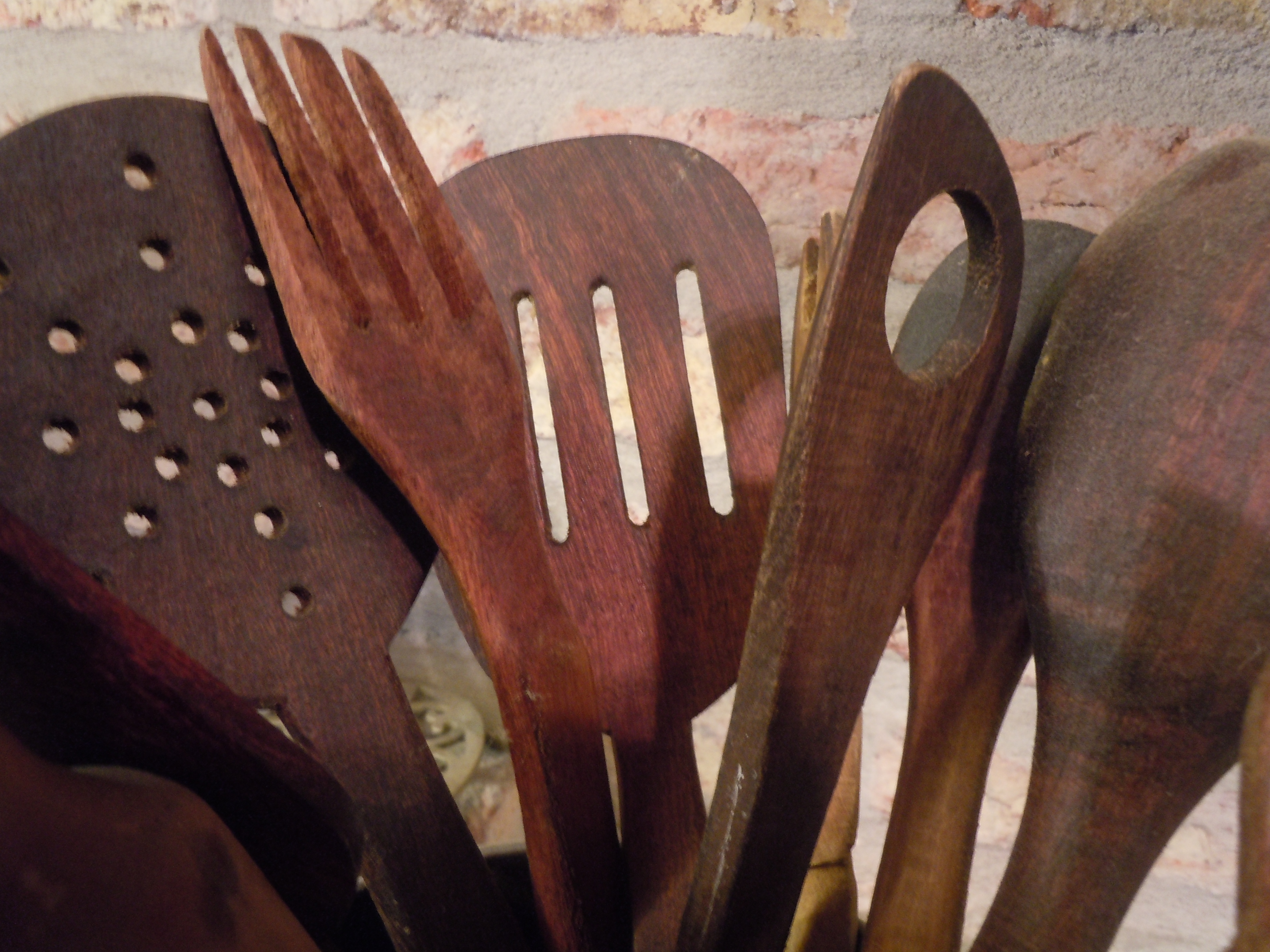
Slotted and perforated wooden spoons

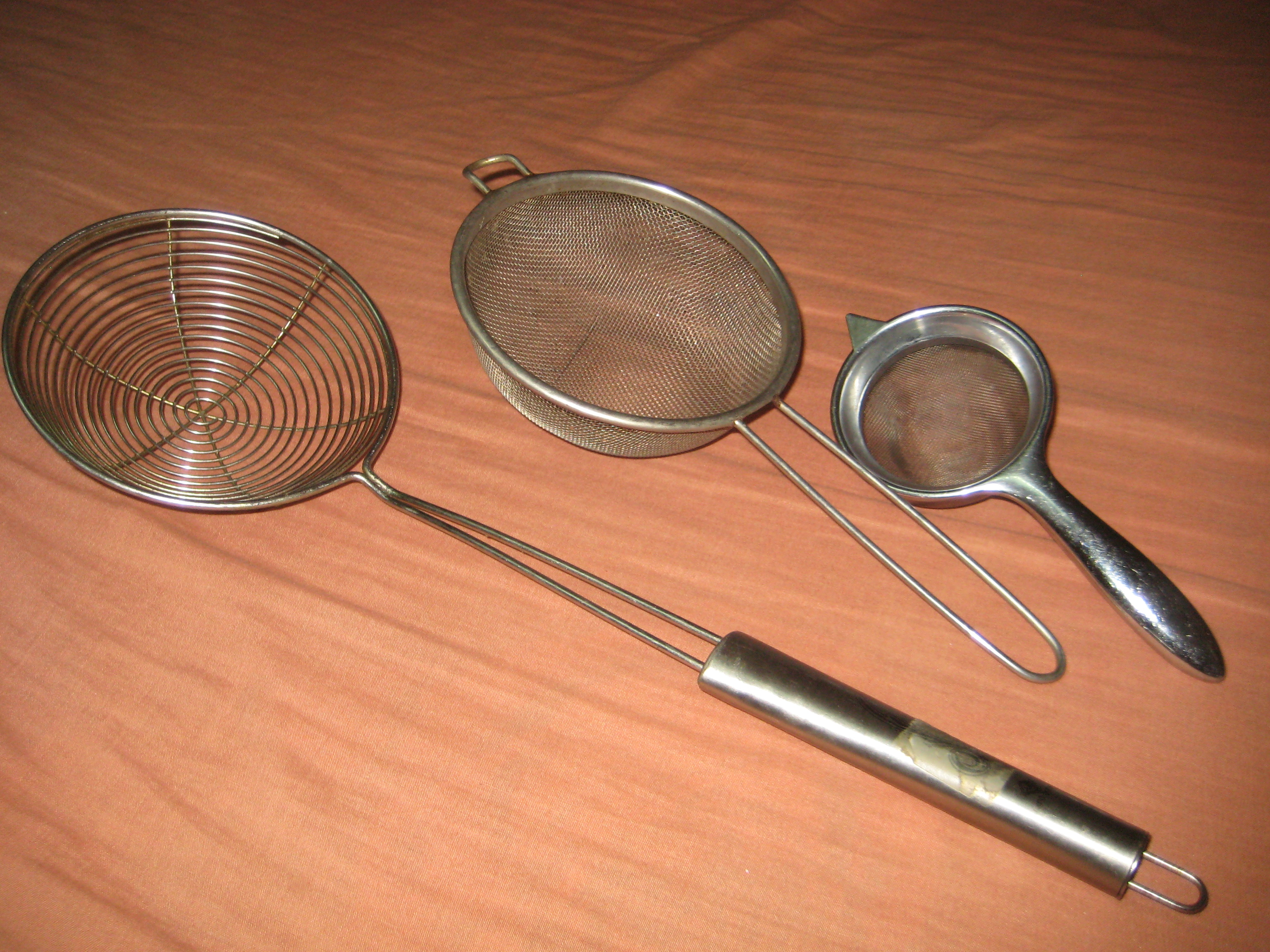
Various strainers, including a spider, left

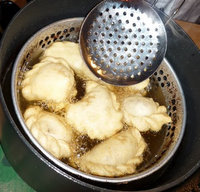
A strainer used in the preparation of empanadas

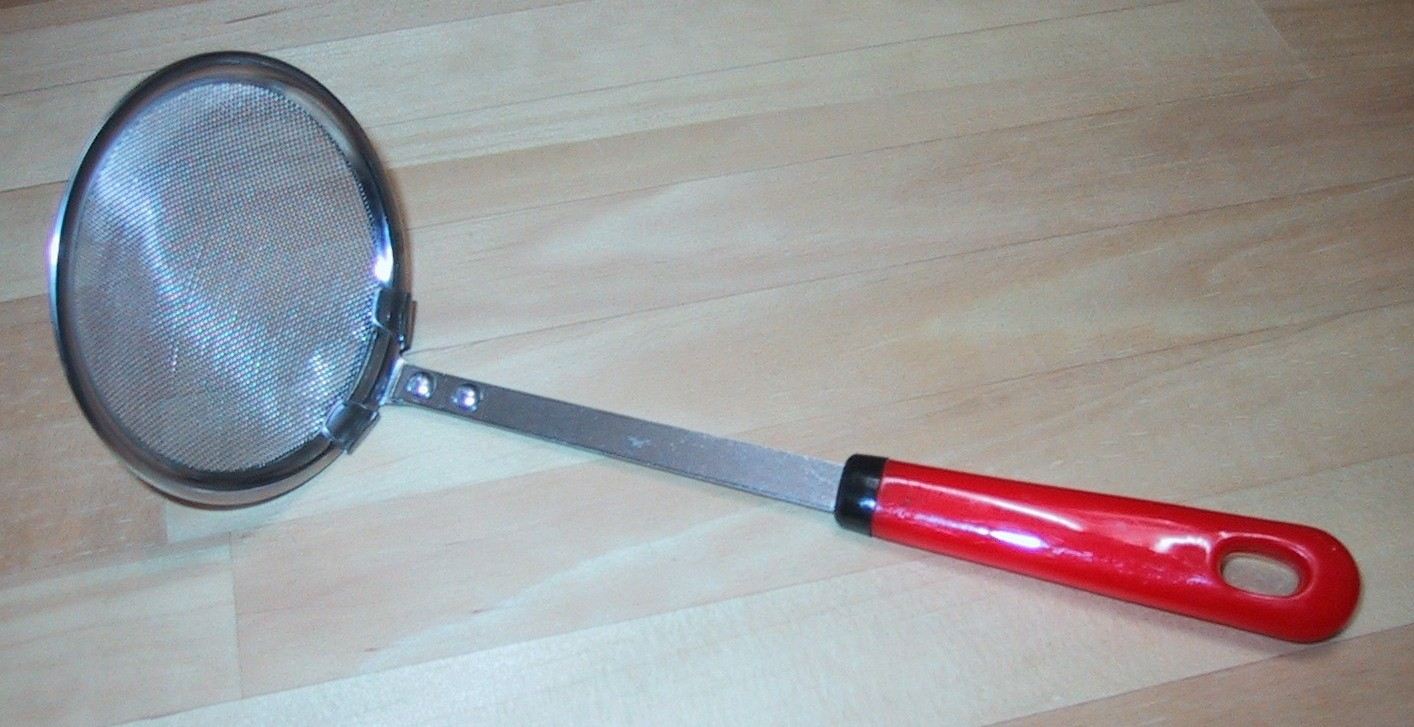
An ami jakushi is a Japanese ladle or scoop that may be used to remove small drops of batter during the frying of tempura.

== Dishes, foods, and culture ==
Deep-fried foods are common in many countries, and have also been described as "a staple of almost all street cuisines on all continents". There are hundreds of dishes that are associated with deep frying as most foods can be deep-fried. Examples of food that can be deep-fried include meat, poultry, fish and vegetables. Fish and chips, for instance, combines deep-fried fish and deep-fried potatoes. French fries, doughnuts, onion rings, and hushpuppies are common deep-fried foods. Other common deep-fried foods include Chinese you bing deep-fried pancakes, Southeast Asian jin deui, and Japanese tempura. Less common deep-fried foods include maple leaves, peanut butter and jelly sandwiches, pizza, Mars and Snickers bars.

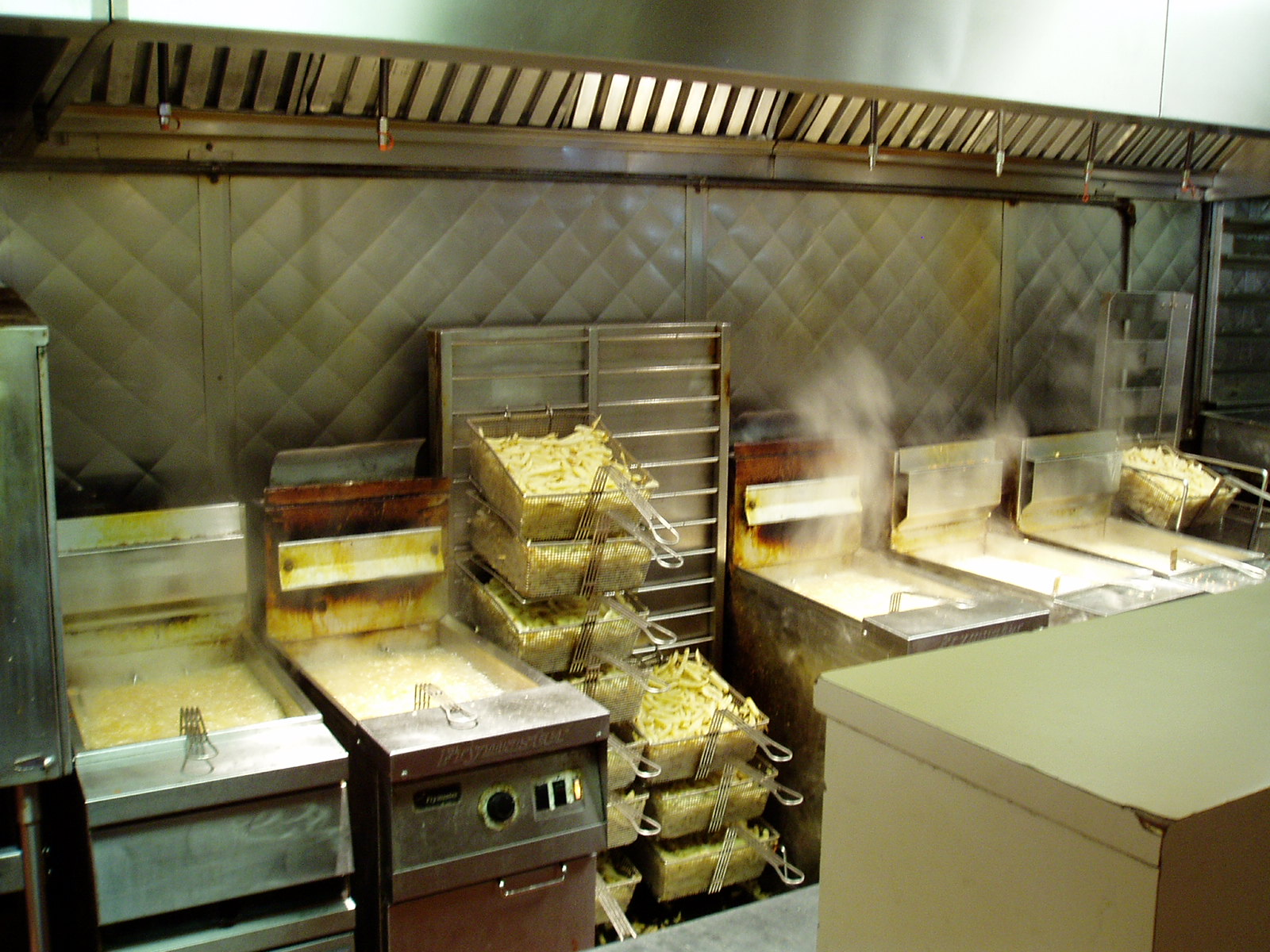
French fries being cooked in a row of deep fryers

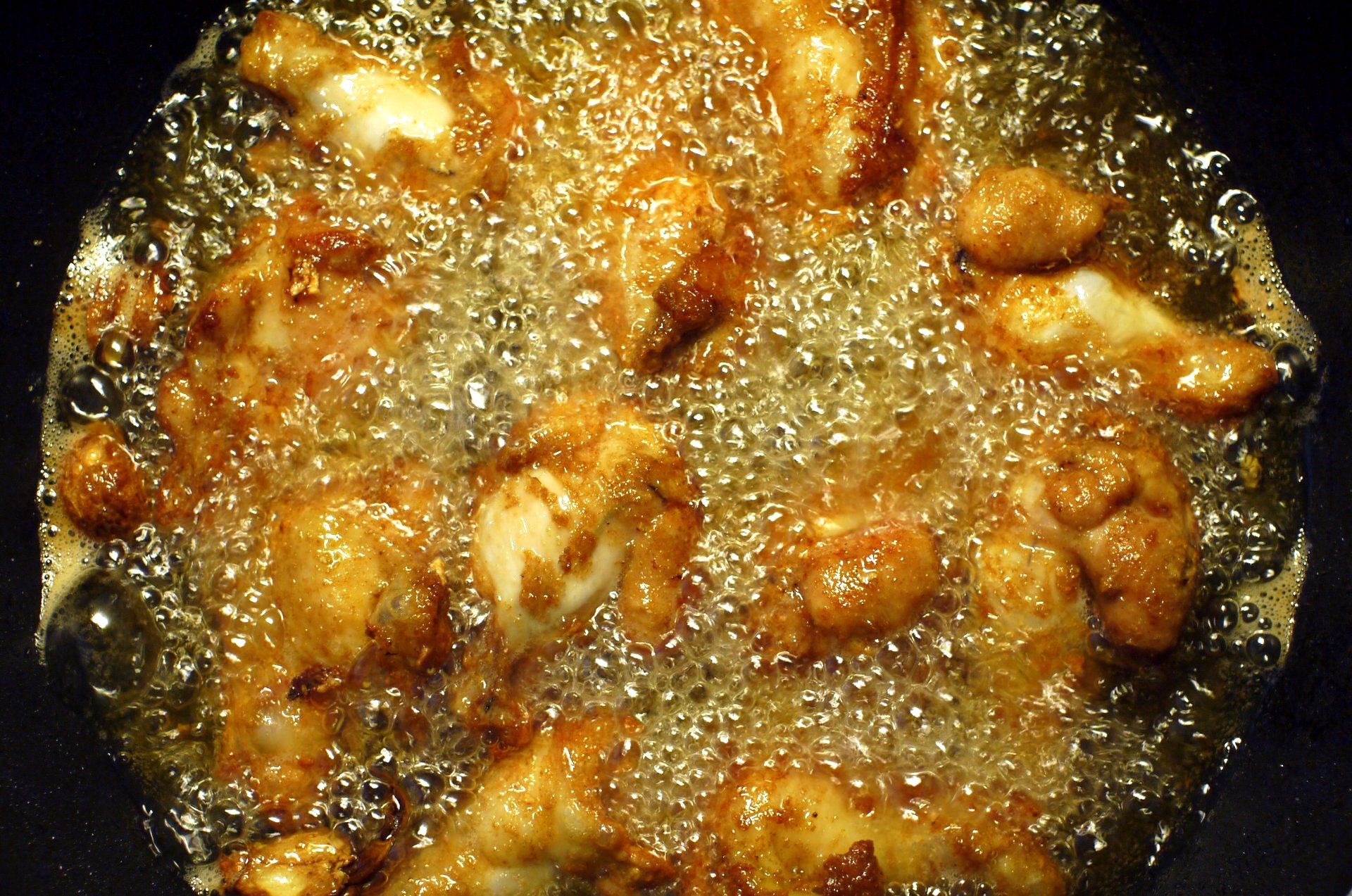
Deep-frying chicken in a pan

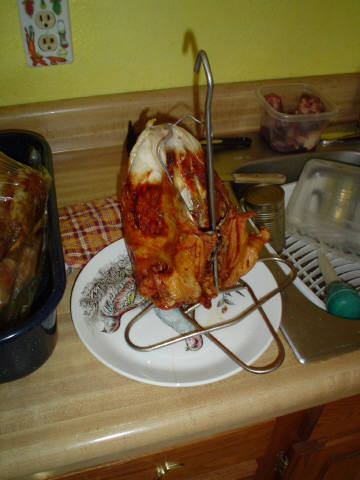
A deep-fried turkey

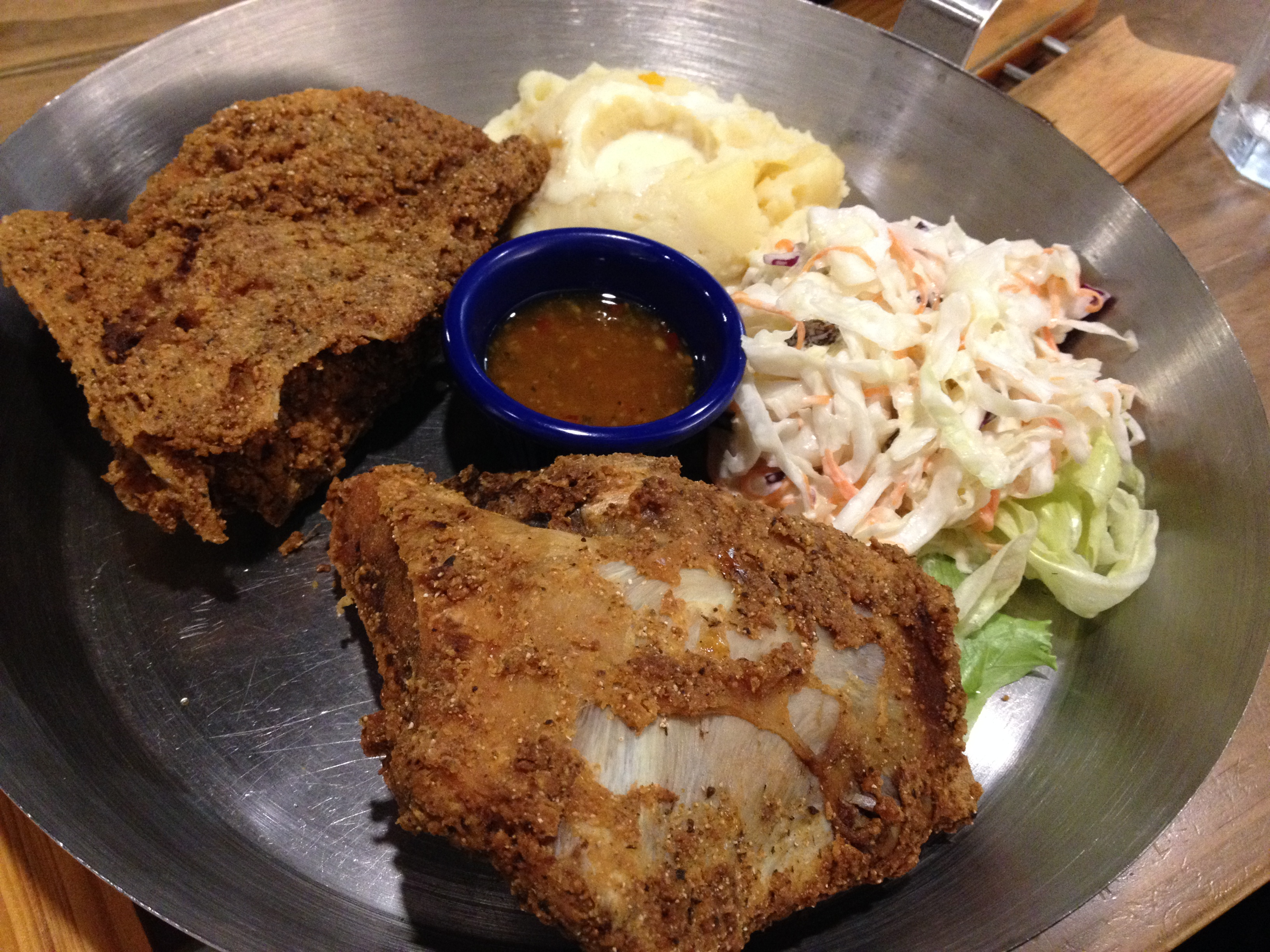
Deep-fried swordfish collar

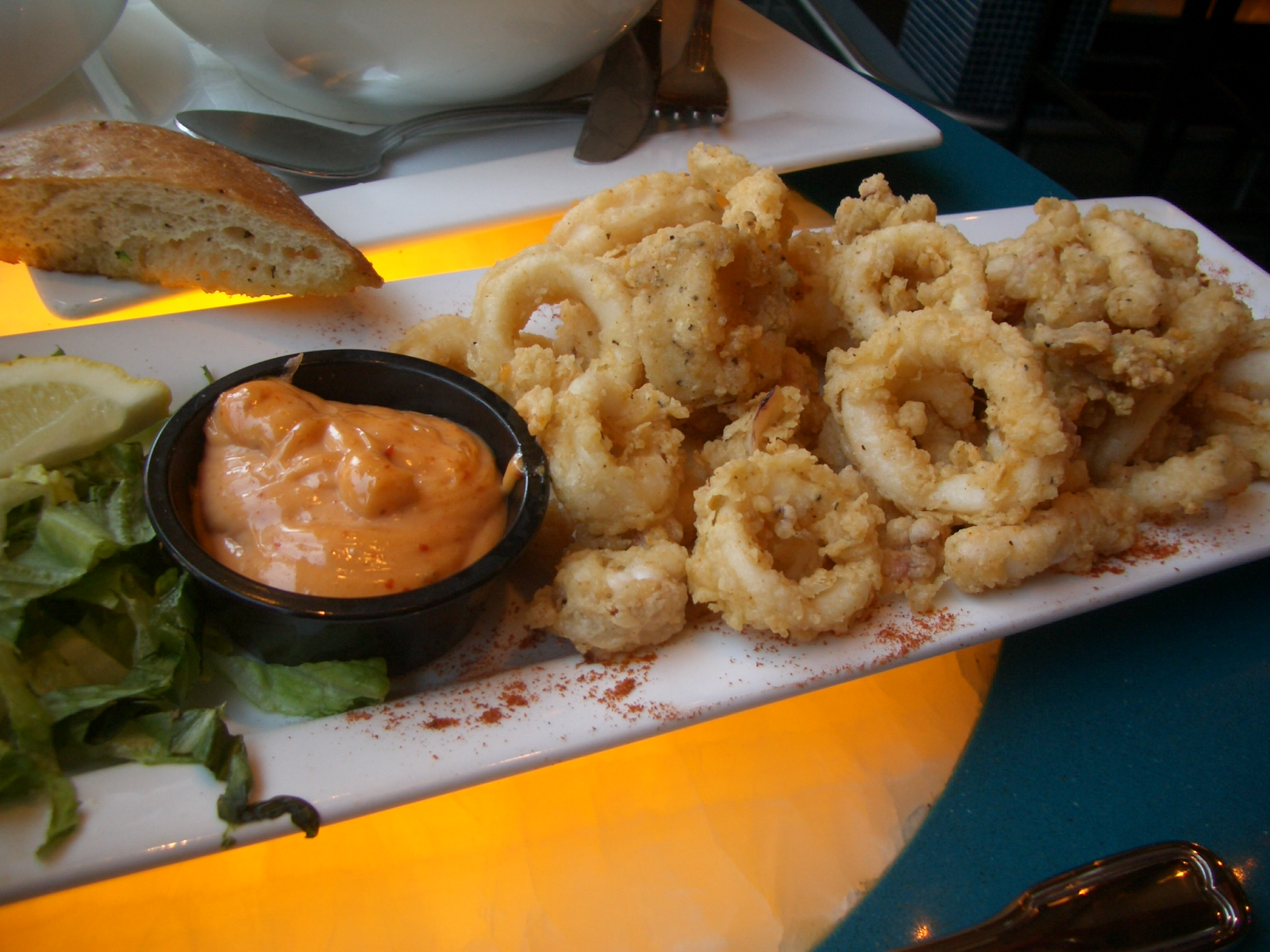
Breaded, deep-fried calamari

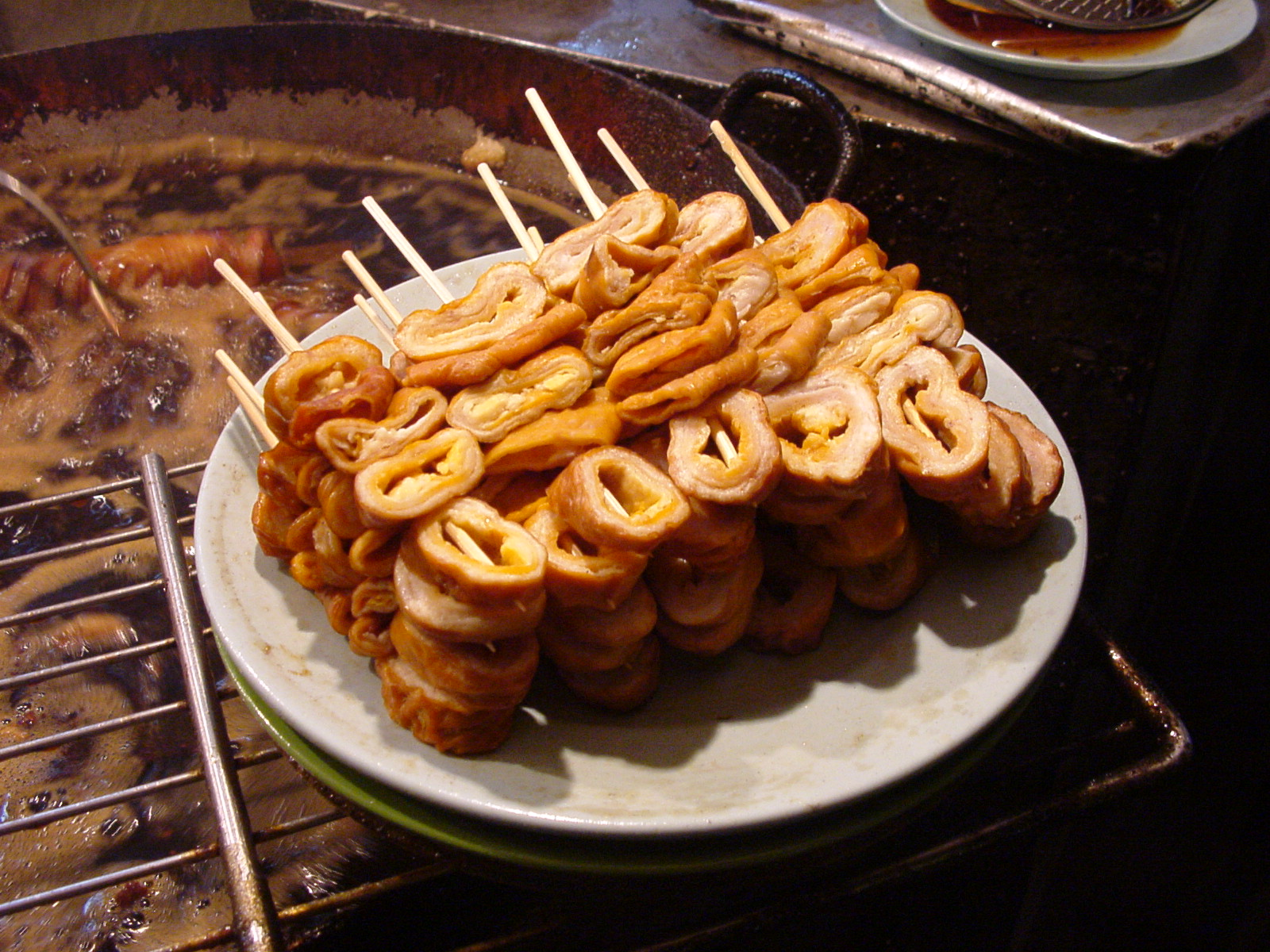
Deep fried chitterlings

=== Africa ===
In Northern Africa, deep-fried dishes are a part of the cuisine. A common food in this region is the deep-fried fritter, also referred to as "sponges". In East Africa deep fried food is common, cooked in cast iron or earthenware pots. Frying in batter is common. A Ugandan specialty is a kind of doughnut called Mandazi. In areas of Southern Africa, street foods include deep-fried potato and cassava chips. Deep-fried foods in the country of South Africa include fish and chips, vetkoek and koeksisters, among others.

=== Asia ===
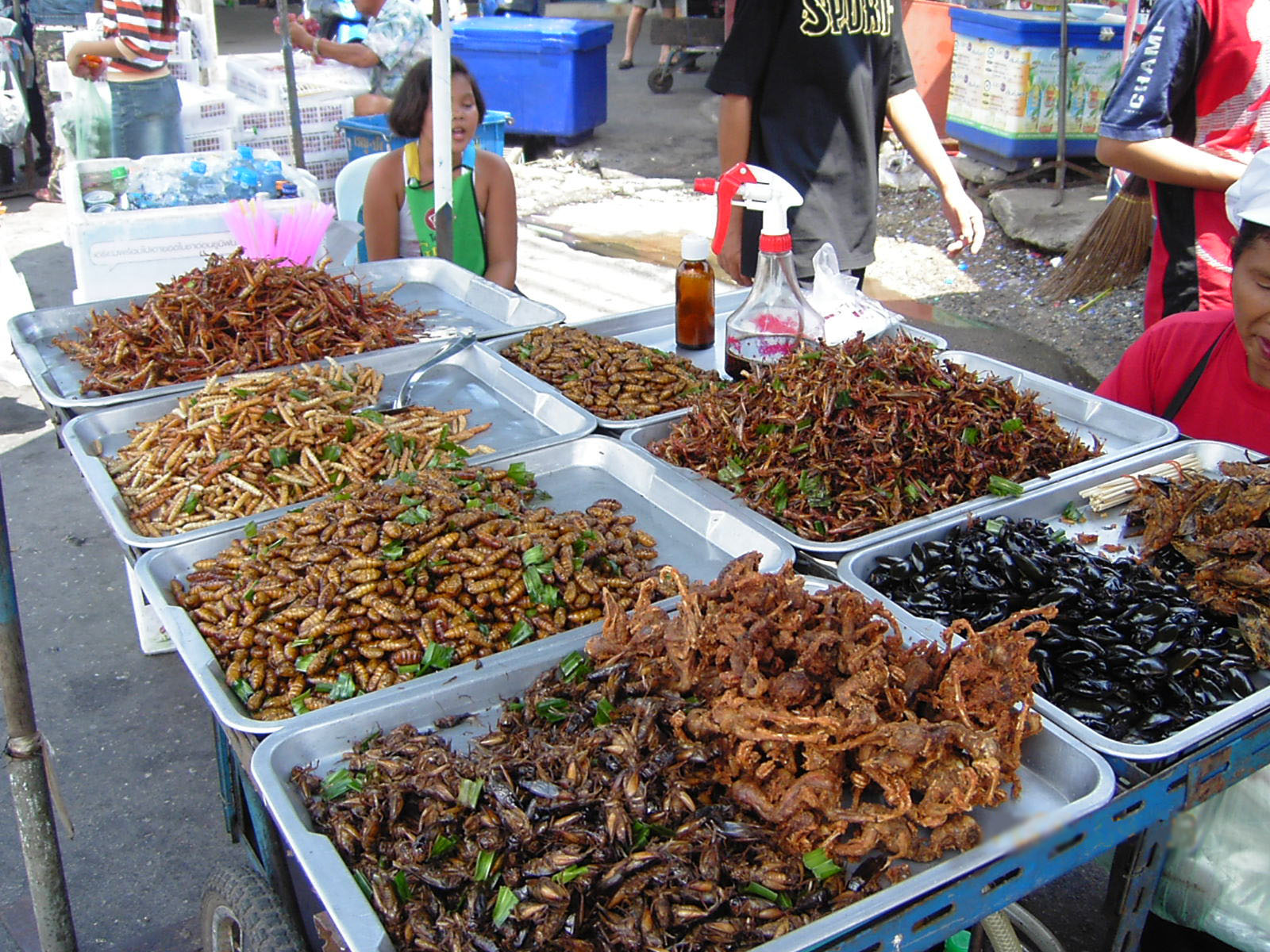
Deep-fried insects for human consumption sold at food stall in Bangkok, Thailand

Japanese tempura is a popular deep-fried food that generally consists of battered and fried seafood and vegetables. Japanese deep-fried dishes, or Agemono, include other styles besides tempura, such as Karaage, Korokke, Kushikatsu, and Tonkatsu.

In areas of Southeast Asia such as Thailand, insects are commonly deep-fried for human consumption. Western-style fast food items such as donuts, deep-fried chicken, and deep-fried potatoes are also becoming popular in Asia.

In Indonesia deep fried food is quite common, serving as either a main dish or a snack. The ingredients are usually deep fried in palm oil, the most widely used cooking oil in the country. Some popular deep fried foods include ayam goreng (chicken), pecel lele (catfish), pempek (fishcake) and tempeh. Fritters in Indonesia is generally identified as gorengan, the most popular one including pisang goreng (banana fritter), bakwan jagung (corn) and tahu goreng (tofu).

Deep-fried fish, tofu, and chả giò are commonly eaten in Vietnamese cuisine. Deep frying is also used to make several kinds of bánh, including bánh rán (fried rice ball), bánh cam (sesame ball), bánh tiêu (hollow doughnut), bánh rế (sweet potato pancake), bánh chuối chiên (banana fritter), Hồ Tây–style bánh tôm (shrimp fritter), and bánh gối (pillow cake).

Deep-fried sticks of dough, known as youtiao in Chinese, are eaten in many East and Southeast Asian cuisines.

In Hong Kong, deep-fried intestine of pigs is a popular food.

In South Asia, popular deep fried snacks are samosa, jalebi, and pakora.

=== Europe ===
Many countries such as the United Kingdom use pure or hydrogenated rapeseed oil for deep-frying. Fish and chips is a very popular deep-fried dish in the U.K. since it originated in London in the 19th century and became popular among the working class. Its popularity continues with 229 million portions of fish and chips being sold annually in England alone.

There is an annual trade fair devoted to deep-fried foods called the International Symposium on Deep-Fat Frying which features discussions on deep fat frying as well as exhibitions by companies involved with the process.

Belgian tradition requires French fries to be deep-fried in filtered fat of cattle, locally called blanc de boeuf or ossewit.

The Mediterranean diets traditionally use olive oil for deep-frying, which is absorbed by the food in the process. Research indicates that virgin olive oil is unique among other cooking oils because it is very rich in monounsaturated fatty acids and contains beneficial micronutrients.

The deep-fried Mars bar originated in Scotland, with The Carron Fish Bar in Stonehaven claiming to have invented it in the early 1990s.

=== North America ===
Fast food is one of the most common ways to consume deep-fried food in North America. Especially in the United States, soybean oil is a popular medium.

In the United States, the Chicago Tribune notes that "you can deep fry almost anything". The South in particular has been noted as a modern center of innovation in the arena of deep-fried food, such that it now constitutes a core part of the region's cuisine. There are many Southern restaurants where the menu consists solely of deep-fried foods; the owner of one such establishment has been quoted as saying "if something is edible, you can bet that someone south of the Mason–Dixon line has tried to cook it in oil".

Especially in the South but increasingly also elsewhere in the United States, novelty deep-fried foods are a popular component of fairground cuisine. Contests exist to reward creativity in innovating such recipes; for example at the Texas State Fair, where hundreds of newfangled offerings over the years have included deep-fried beer, Coca-Cola, and butter (the latter two invented by Abel Gonzales). Since 2013, a reality competition show called Deep-Fried Masters, produced by Discovery Networks, has hosted such competitions at state fairs across the country.

Moreover, deep frying has even served as a medium of artistic expression using non-edible objects. Henry Hargreaves in particular is noted for his deep-fried replicas of electronic items such as iPads, Game Boys, and laptops.

Deep-fried desserts popular in North America include doughnuts, churros, and beignets, the latter having French origins but now a particular specialty of the U.S. city of New Orleans.

=== Oceania ===
Fish and chip shops in Australia may purvey several types of deep-fried foods, along with other food types.

=== South America ===
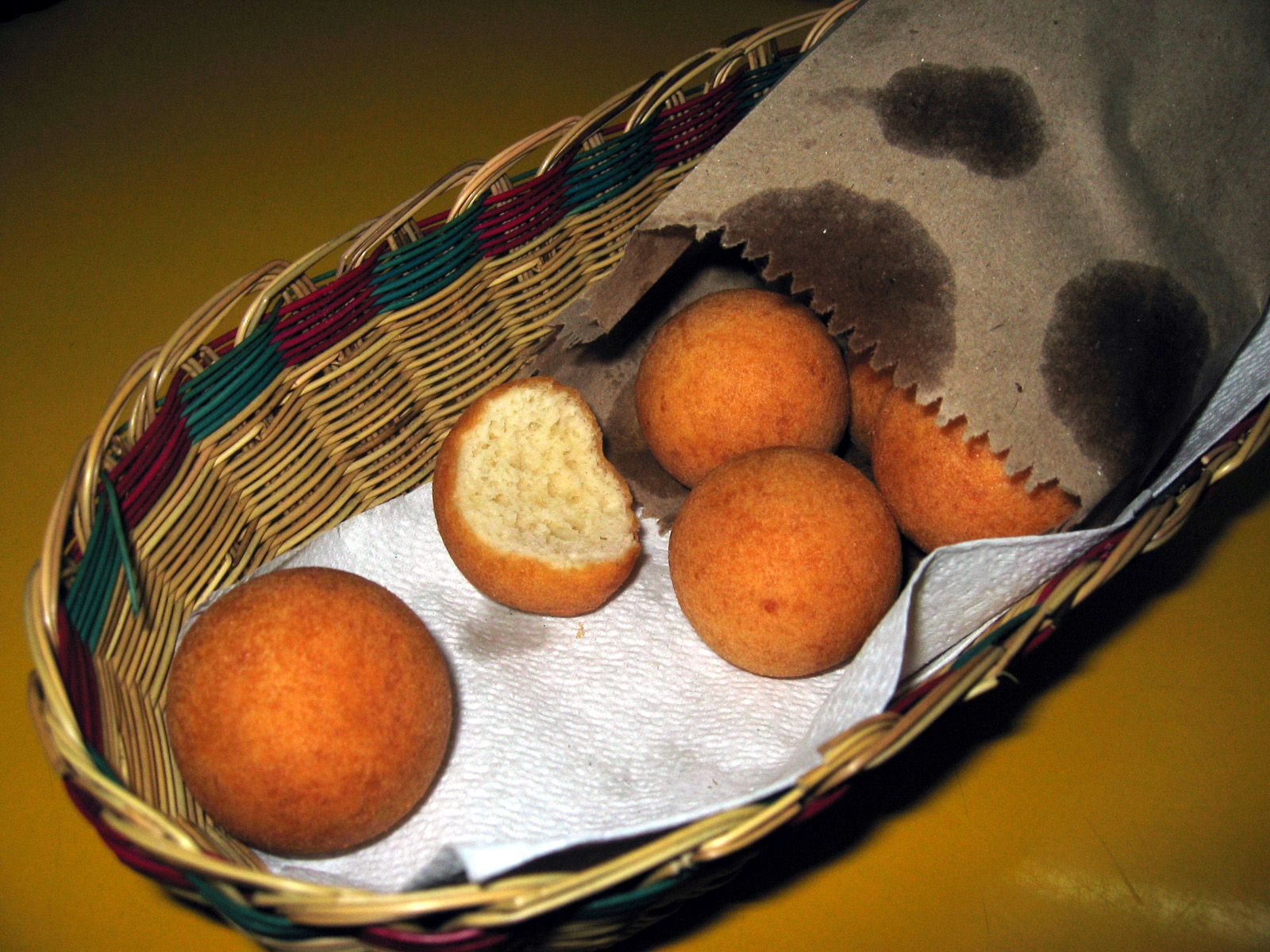
Buñuelos

The buñuelo, a fried dough ball popular in Central America and Greece, is a popular deep-fried snack and street food in South America. Picarone, a Peruvian dessert originated in the colonial period, are deep-fried doughs made with pumpkin and sweet potatoes, popular in Peru and Chile, especially during harvest festivals., a family of deep fried cakes is well known across, sopaipillas a Chilean bread are deep fried in oil or butter also made with pumpkin, Chancay a Peruvian bread made of flour, salt and yeast, known as chipá cuerito in Paraguay and Torta frita in Argentina and Uruguay, made of flour, salt and yeast, sometimes addition with milk and animal fat and fried in cow fat, the churro, a fried dough popular in Spain is a popular fried snack and street food in Argentina and Uruguay, milanesa a deep fried breaded veal beef from Argentina, Paraguay and Uruguay.

== Oil deterioration and chemical changes ==
Deep fat frying involves heating oil to temperatures in excess of 180 °C in the presence of moisture and air. These conditions can induce a series of complex chemical reactions which may impact the quality of both the food and the oil it is cooked in. Examples of different chemical reactions include the production of free radicals, oxidation, hydrolysis, isomerization and polymerization. The exact reactions are dependent upon factors such as the oil type, frying conditions, and food being cooked. When frying, water can attack the ester linkage of triacylglycerols, resulting in mono- and diglycerols, glycerol, and free fatty acids (a type of hydrolysis reaction). The aforementioned hydrolysis reaction is enhanced by the produced fatty acids and other low molecular weight acid compounds.

Overheating or over-using the frying oil leads to formation of rancid-tasting products of oxidation, polymerization, and other deleterious, unintended or even toxic compounds such as acrylamide (from starchy foods). Recent research suggests fat deterioration may be worse when fat or oil is fried with food than when fat or oil is tested on its own in a laboratory. Deep-frying under vacuum helps to significantly reduce acrylamide formation, but this process is not widely used in the food industry due to the high investment cost involved.

Some useful tests and indicators of excessive oil deterioration are the following:

- Sensory – darkening, smoke, foaming, thickening, rancid taste and unpleasant smell when heating. This is the most unreliable way to decide when to change oil because those are very individual factors and can depend on different causes.
- Testing strips – decide when to change oil depending on FFA (free fatty acids) only
- Oil-tester – measurement tool to exactly define the point of change oil by TPM/TPC (Total polar material/compounds)
- Laboratory – acidity, anisidine value, viscosity, total polar compounds, polymeric triglycerides.

Instruments that indicate total polar compounds, currently the best single gauge of how deep-fried an object is, are available with sufficient accuracy for restaurant and industry use.

== Hazards ==
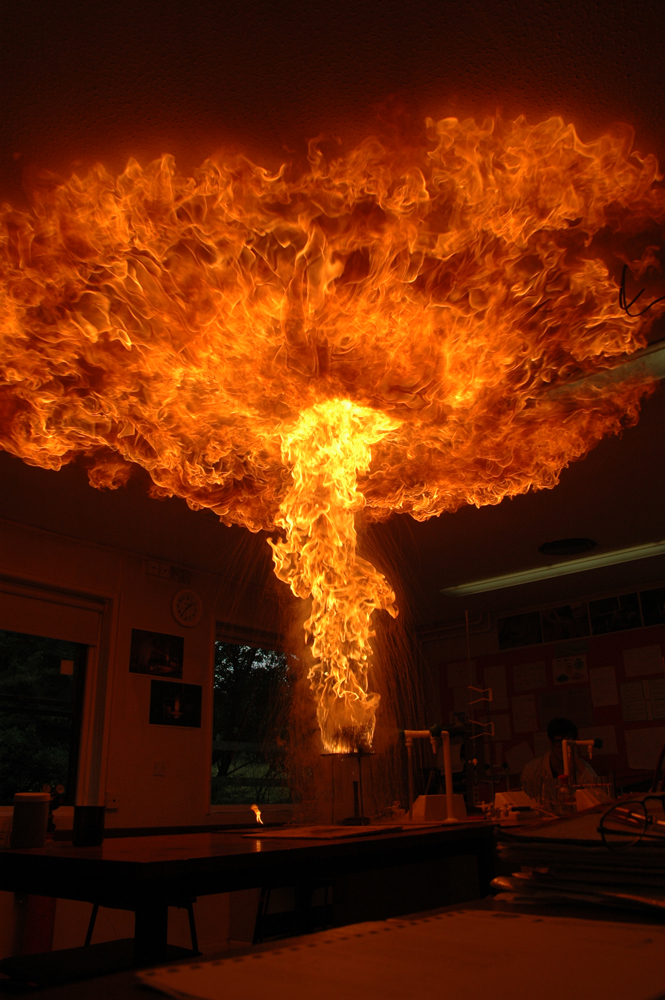
When deep frying, fires can be very severe, with chip pan fires being the leading cause of house fires in the United Kingdom.

Cooking oil is not flammable at room temperature but can become flammable when used at high temperatures. Fires ensue if it gets ignited under these conditions. Further, attempts to extinguish an oil fire with water can cause an extremely dangerous condition (a slopover) as they cause the water to flash into steam due to the high heat of the oil, in turn sending the burning oil in all directions and thus aggravating the fire. This is the leading cause of house fires in the United Kingdom. Instead, oil fires must be extinguished with a class F fire extinguisher or by starving the fire of oxygen, such as can be accomplished by putting a lid back on the pan or using a fire blanket. Other means of extinguishing an oil fire include application of dry powder (e.g., baking soda, salt) or firefighting foam. Most commercial deep fryers are equipped with automatic fire suppression systems using foam.

Spilled hot cooking oil can also cause severe third degree burns; in the worst-case scenario, severe burns can be fatal. The higher temperatures and tendency of oil to stick to the skin make spilled hot cooking oil far more dangerous than spilled hot water. Children can accidentally place their hands on top of the stove, play with the materials while being cooked, or accidentally pull the pot down, which can cause significant injury. If children are present, the utmost care should be used when deep frying so that their safety can be protected at all times.

== Environmental ==
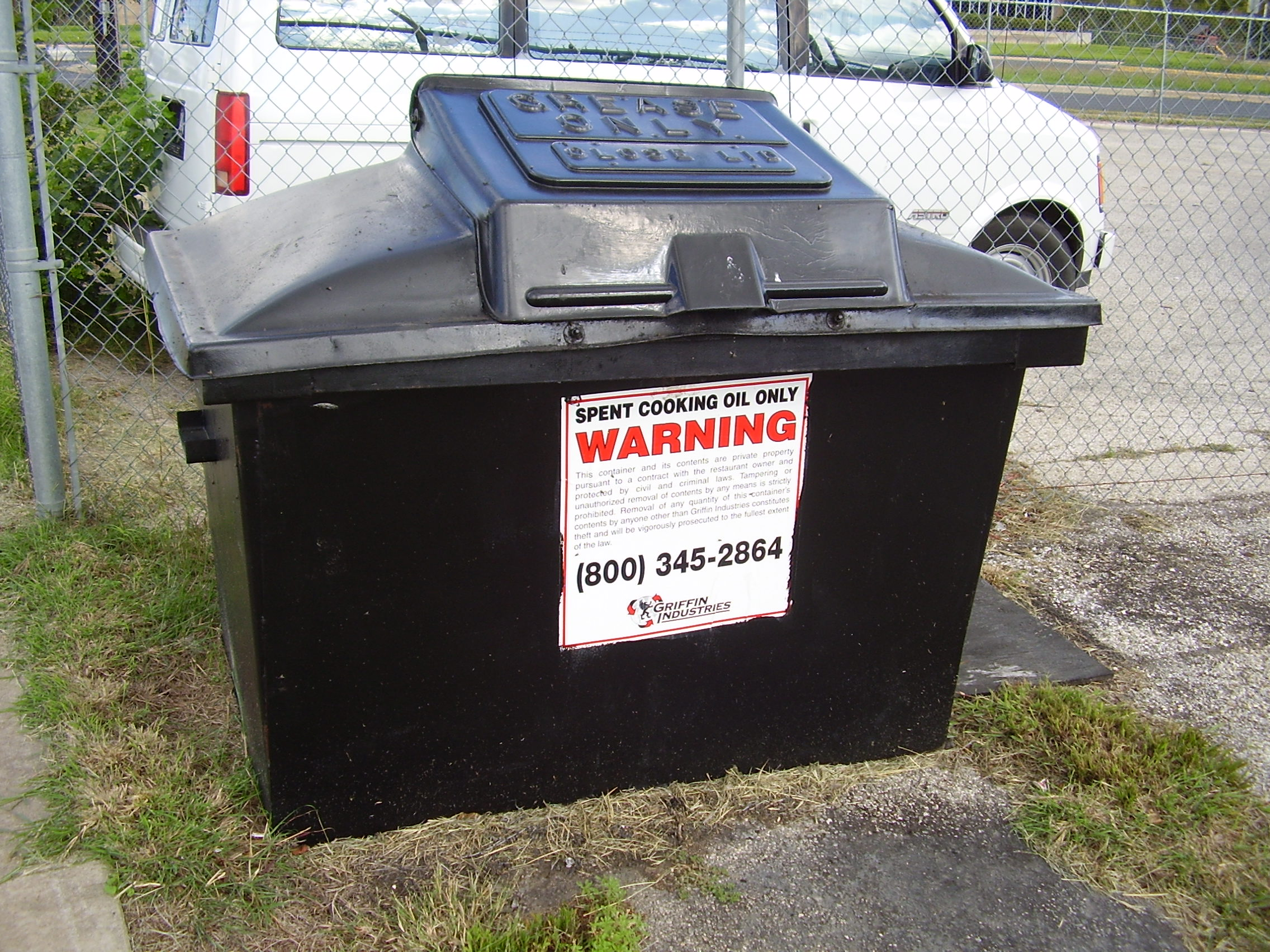
A bin for spent cooking oil in Austin, Texas, managed by a recycling company

Deep frying produces large amounts of waste oil, which must be disposed of properly. Waste oil can contribute to the creation of fatbergs, overflow sewage systems, bind to the walls of sewage pipes, and interfere with sewage treatment. Waste oil from deep frying is increasingly being recycled and refined into biodiesel.

The heating element in a deep fryer consumes enormous energy, electricity or otherwise. According to one source, an average home appliance deep fryer draws 2,000 watts. Potatoes that are stored in artificially humidified warehouses contain more water, which makes the time required to deep fry them into chips longer. This increases the carbon dioxide footprint of commercially producing chips because more energy is required for frying over a longer time.

== Health ==
The process of deep frying food is generally detrimental to its nutritional value. The oils that foods absorb in their batter typically contain large amounts of saturated fats and trans fats. Consumption of large amounts of saturated and trans fats has been linked to a higher risk for some cancers.

Eating deep-fried foods has also been linked to higher cholesterol levels, obesity, heart attacks, and diabetes. Deep-fried foods cooked at certain temperatures can also contain acrylamide. This discovery in 2002 led to international health concerns. Subsequent research has however found that it is not likely that the acrylamides in burnt or well-cooked food cause cancer in humans; Cancer Research UK categorizes the idea that burnt food causes cancer as a "myth".

Additionally, fat degradation processes (lipid peroxidation) during deep frying results in the loss of nutritional value in deep-fried foods.

Cooking oil that has been used for too long may in addition cause blood pressure elevation and vascular hypertrophy.

Trans fats are used in shortenings for deep-frying in restaurants, as they can be used for longer than most conventional oils before becoming rancid. In the early 21st century, non-hydrogenated vegetable oils that have lifespans exceeding that of the frying shortenings became available. As fast-food chains routinely use different fats in different locations, trans fat levels in fast food can have large variations. The amount of trans fat that is formed during frying appears to increase with frying temperature, frying time, oil oxidation, and oil reuse.

Some studies have found that deep frying in olive and sunflower oils has been found to be less of a detriment to health and in some cases have positive effects on insulin levels. Oil can be reused a few times after original use after straining out solids. However, excessive use of the same oil can cause it to break down and release compounds into the food that may be carcinogenic, affect liver health, or influence the body's ability to absorb vitamins. Some European countries have set public health standards for the safety of frying oil.

== See also ==
- Lipid peroxidation
- List of deep fried foods
- Recovery time (culinary)
- Deep frying (internet phenomenon)
