= Kitchenware =

Items used for preparing, storing and serving food

For a record label, see Kitchenware Records

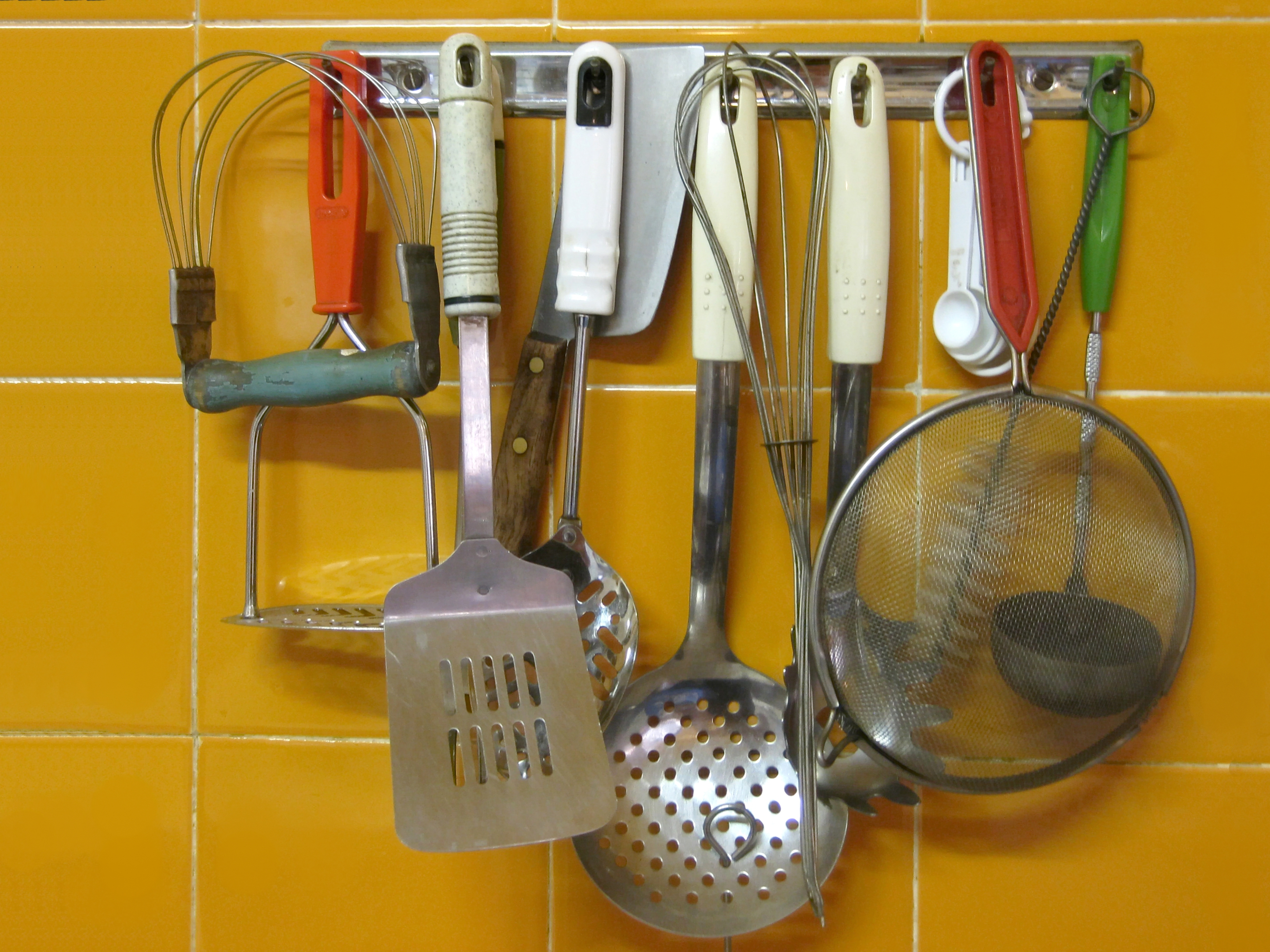
Various kitchen utensils on a kitchen hook strip. From left: – Pastry blender and potato masher – Spatula and (hidden) serving fork – Skimmer and chef's knife (small cleaver) – Whisk and slotted spoon – Spaghetti ladle – Sieve and measuring spoon set – Bottlebrush and ladle

Kitchenware refers to the tools, utensils, appliances, dishes, and cookware used in food preparation and the serving of food. Kitchenware can also be used to hold or store food before or after preparation.

== Types ==
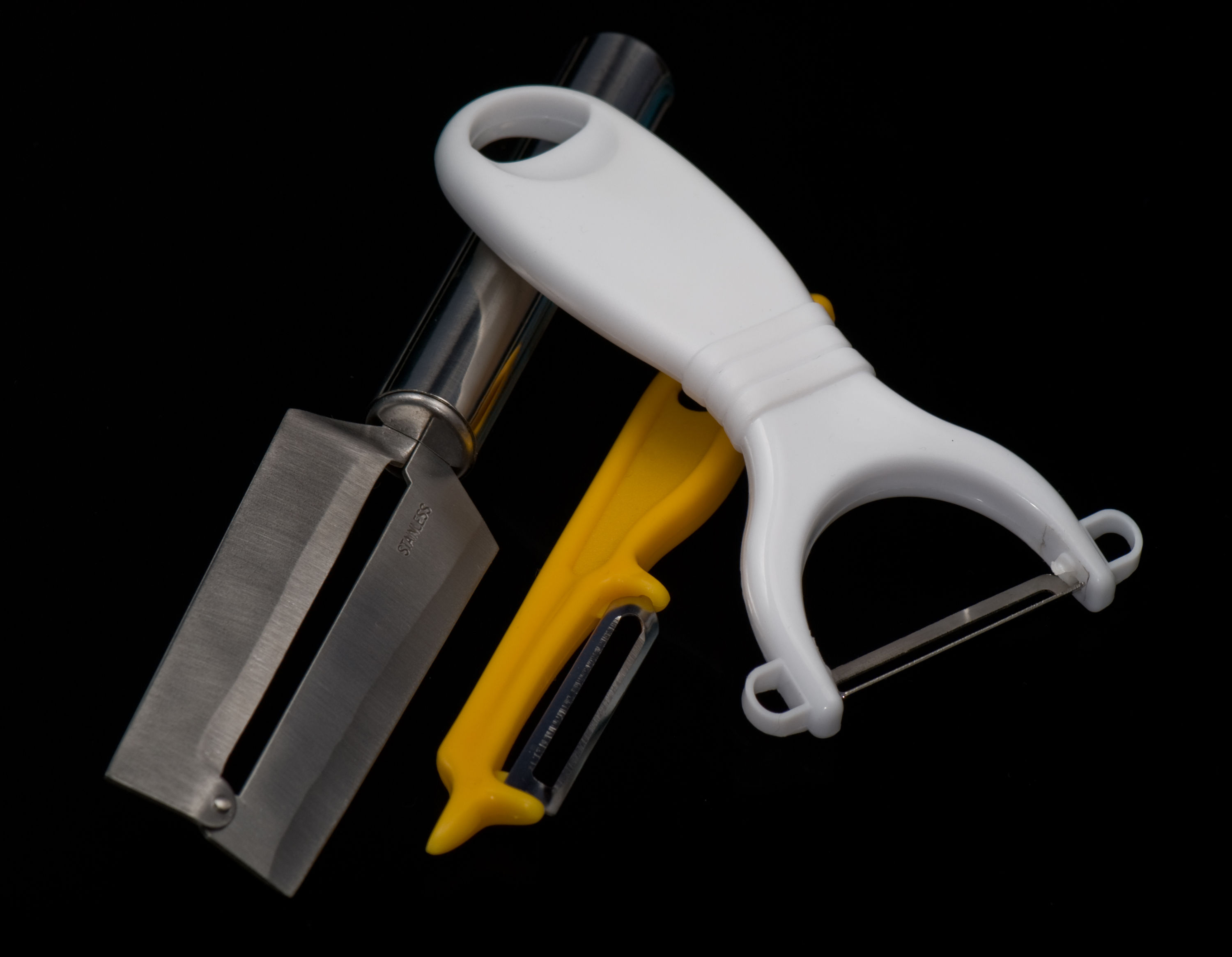
Peelers a fixed blade, Australian and Y peeler

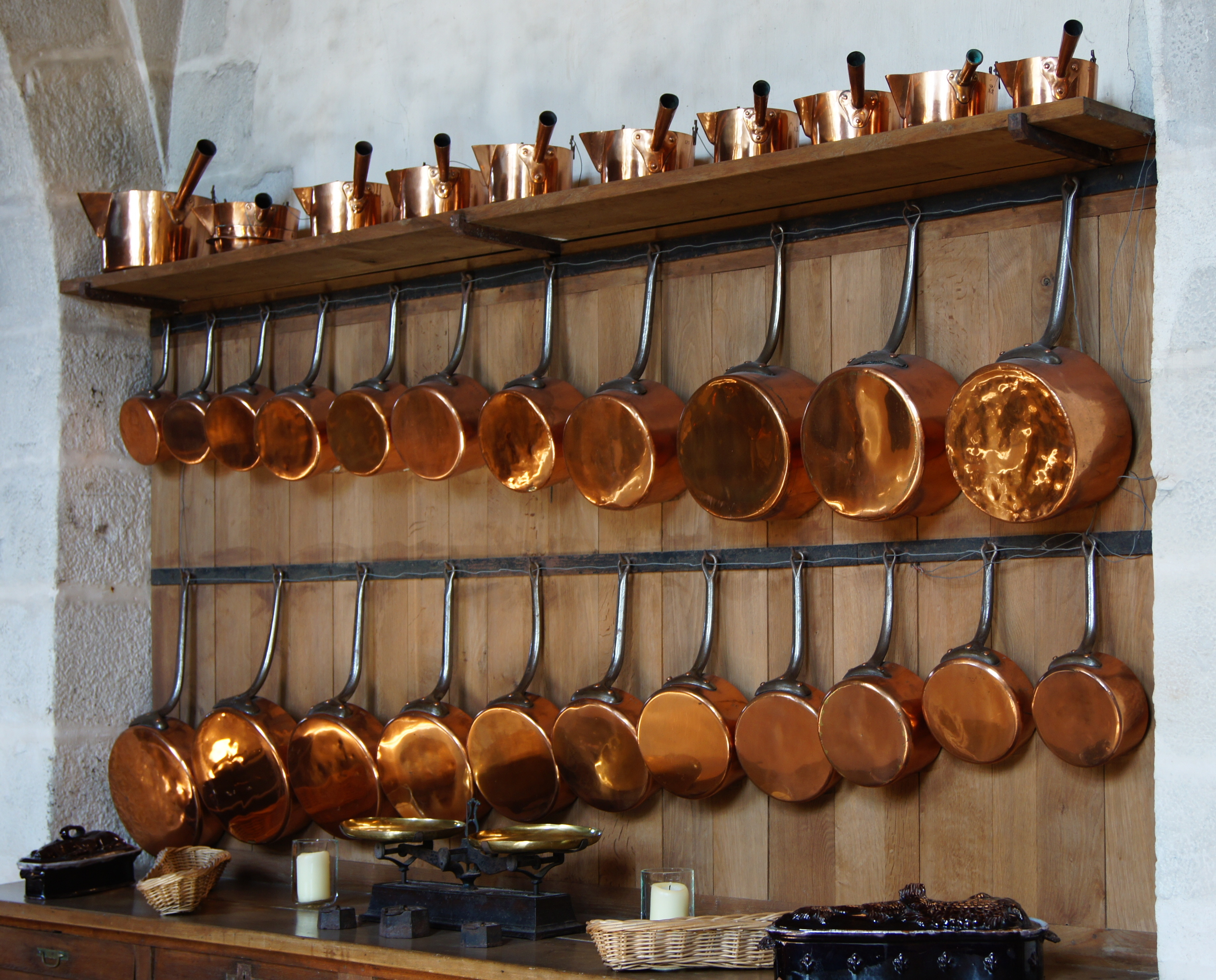
Copper saucepans, Vaux-le-Vicomte castle

Kitchenware encompasses a wide range of tools. Some of the most common items of kitchenware are:

- Baking dish
- Baking tray
- Cake pan
- Can opener
- Chopping board
- Coffee press
- Colander
- Cooling rack
- Corkscrew
- Cutlery
- Dinnerware
- Eggbeater
- Egg slicer
- Electric mixer
- Fork
- Frying pan
- Garlic press
- Grater
- Glassware
- Grill pan
- Kitchen scissors
- Kitchen knives
- Mandolin
- Measuring cups and spoons
- Measuring spoon
- Meat slicer
- Mixing bowls
- Muffin tin
- Pressure cooker
- Pasta server
- Peeler
- Pepper mill
- Pie dish
- Pizza stone
- Plates
- Potato masher
- Potato ricer
- Rolling pin
- Saucepan
- Serving fork
- Serving spoon
- Sheet pan
- Sieve
- Skillet
- Slotted spoon
- Soup spoon
- Spatula
- Spiral vegetable slicer
- Spoon
- Stock pot
- Steamers
- Strainer
- Timer
- Tomato slicer
- Tongs
- Tray
- Whisk
- Wok
- Wooden spoon
- Zester

== See also ==
- Batterie de cuisine
- Cookware and bakeware
- Gastronorm, a European size standard for kitchenware
- Eurobox, a European size standard for storage and transport
- List of cooking vessels
- List of eating utensils
- List of food preparation utensils
- List of glassware
- List of Japanese cooking utensils
- List of serving utensils
- List of types of spoons
- NSF International, formerly "National Sanitation Foundation"
- Timeline of culinary technologies
- Tableware
