= Spider (utensil) =

Cooking utensil in the form of a wire basket on a long handle

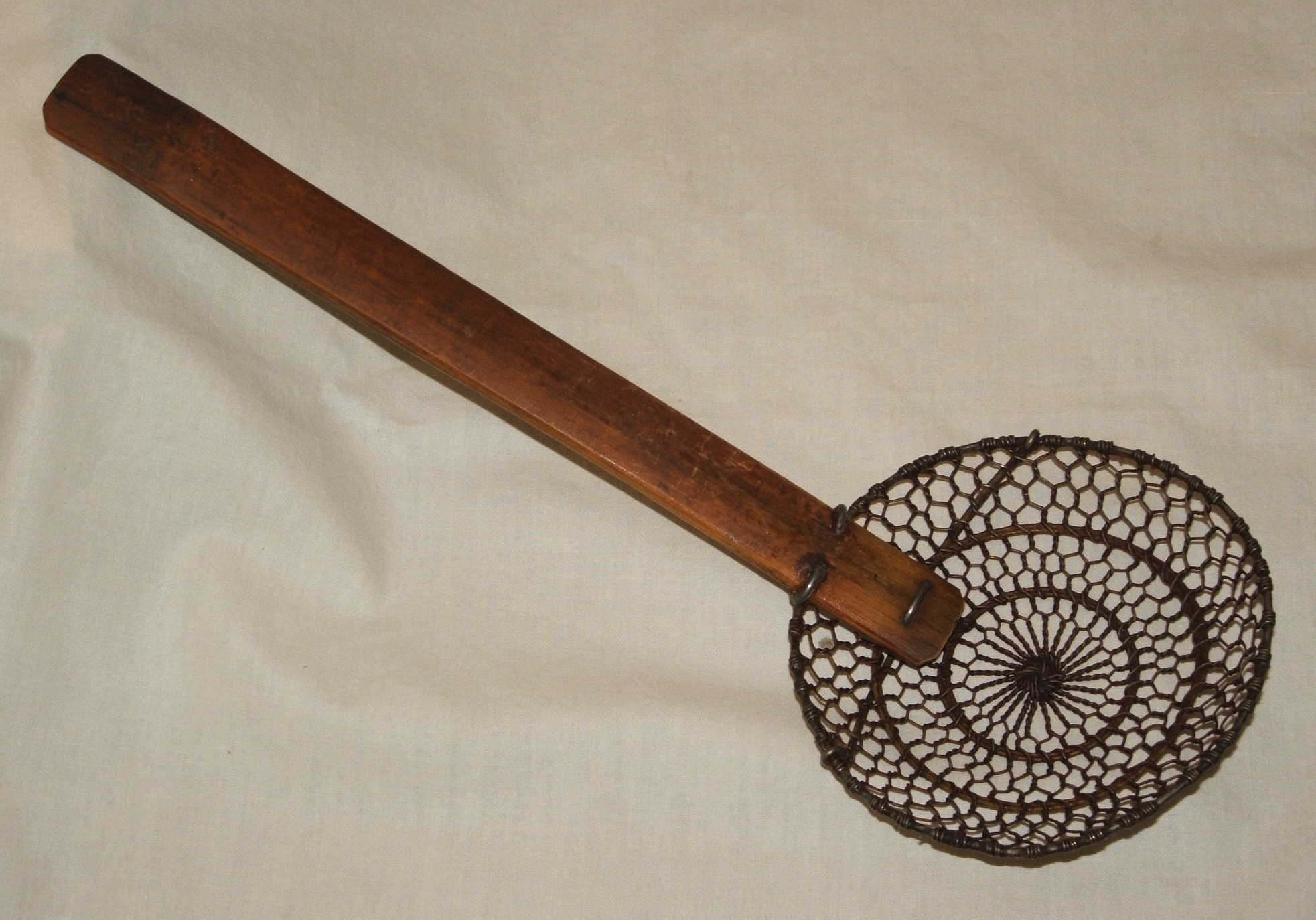
Spider

A spider (simplified Chinese: 笊篱; traditional Chinese: 笊籬; pinyin: zhàolí) is a type of skimmer prevalent in East Asian cuisine in the form of a wide shallow wire-mesh basket with a long handle, used for removing hot food from a liquid or skimming foam off when making broths. The name is derived from the wire pattern, which looks like a spider's web. It has been widely adopted in Western cuisine by cooks who favour the open mesh over slotted spoons for faster and safer drainage.

Unlike sieves or strainers, which have fine mesh screens for straining away liquids as food is retrieved, the spider can be used as a strainer for larger pieces of food. However, most often it is used as a skimming tool to add or remove foods from hot liquids, such as water or oil. Spiders may be somewhat flat and round or small round spoon-like utensils shaped into the form of an open basket. They may also be referred to as sieves, spoon sieves, spoon skimmers, or basket skimmers.

== Usage ==
A spider is good for lifting and draining foods from hot oil, soups, stocks and boiling water. It is a handy tool for skimming stocks, blanching vegetables and deep frying foods. This kitchen utensil is most often used to retrieve foods that are being cooked in pots or pans of hot water. The spider can be dipped into steaming hot water or oil and placed under many different types of food to pull pieces out for inspection or for removing for cooling prior to eating.

== See also ==
- Ami shakushi, equivalent Japanese utensil
