= Wok brush =

Kitchenware used to clean a wok

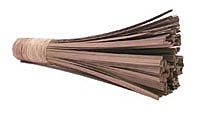
A Wok Brush

A wok brush is a type of kitchenware that is used to clean a wok. It is made of a bundle of split bamboo stalks tied at the top. It is used with the wok still hot and with hot water or water added to a heated wok to clean without degreaser so the wok does not rust.

To maintain the layer built up on the surface of the wok over time, the bamboo filaments must be strong enough to eliminate any remains stuck to the wok itself, and at the same time, soft enough that no damage is made to the surface of the wok.
