= Ami jakushi =

Japanese cooking utensil

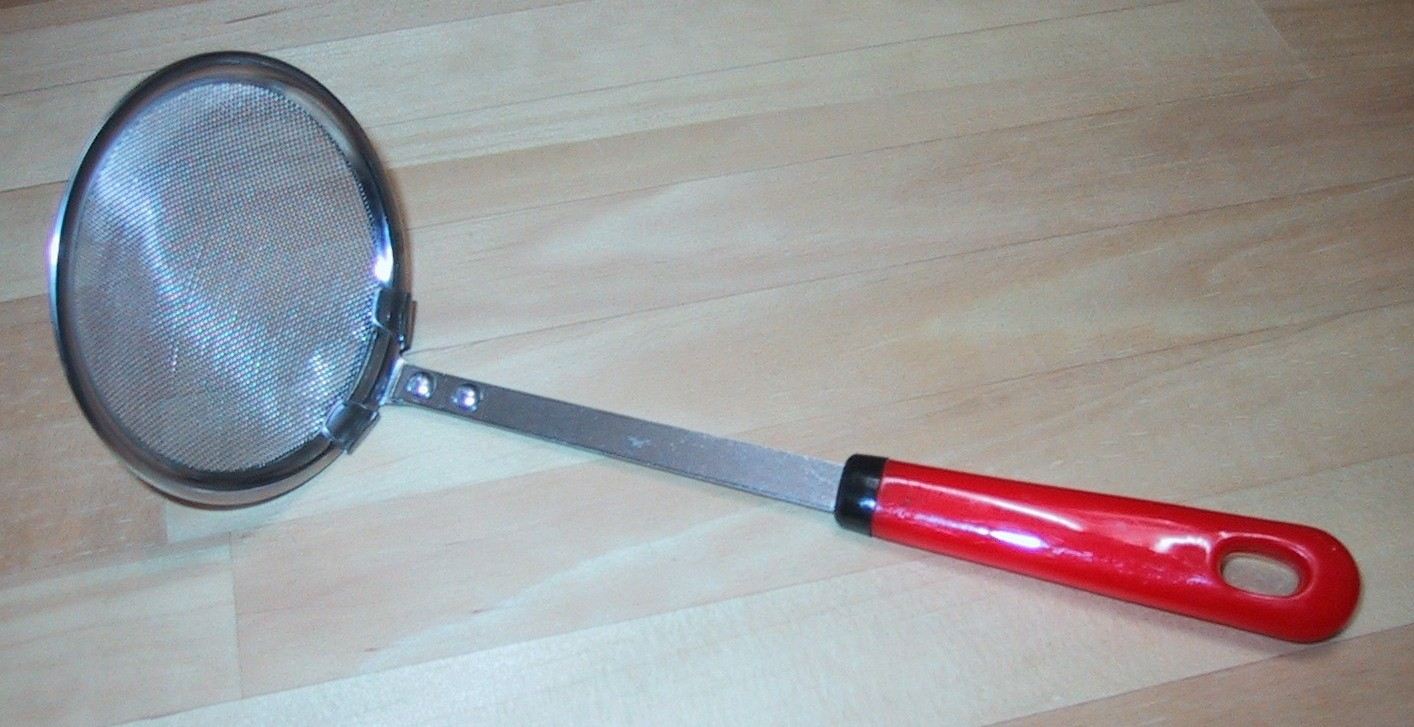
Ami shakushi

Ami jakushi (網杓子) is a skimmer used in the Japanese kitchen. The skimmer is made from a fine wire mesh and is used to remove small pieces of unwanted food or foam from a liquid. For example, in deep frying, the ami jakushi is used to remove small drops of batter during the frying of tempura. Another example would be the removal of foam from a miso soup to achieve a more pleasing aesthetic.

== See also ==
- Spider – Chinese utensil
- List of Japanese cooking utensils
