= Vacuum fryer =

Special device to deep fry food in a vacuum

A vacuum fryer is a deep-frying device housed inside a vacuum chamber. With vacuum frying it is easier to maintain natural colors and flavours of the finished product. Due to the lower temperatures applied (approximately 130 °C (266 °F)), the formation of suspected carcinogen acrylamide is significantly lower than in standard atmospheric fryers, where the frying temperature is approximately 170 °C (338 °F). The fat absorption of the products is also reported to be lower than in atmospheric fryers. In Southeast Asia (mainly the Philippines, Thailand, China and Indonesia) batch type vacuum fryers are mainly used for the production of fruit chips. However, these machines are only appropriate for relatively small production companies.

== Working principle ==
Water boils at lower temperatures at lower pressure. As pressure decreases below that of the general atmosphere, the boiling point of water also drops below 100 °C (212 °F).

Vacuum fryers allow food items to be fried at lower temperatures by lowering the pressure inside the chamber. This allows the frying of heat-sensitive foods that would have otherwise been burned in the normal deep frying process.

== Continuous vacuum fryers ==
For larger production quantities, continuous vacuum fryers are available. In these installations, the vacuum frying pan is installed in a stainless steel vacuum tube. The infeed of the raw product is carried out through a rotary airlock. Depending on the application, the frying pan itself is designed to meet the different product specifications. A transport belt takes the finished product out of the fryer and towards the outfeed system. A lock chamber at the exit of the vacuum tube prevents air from entering the vacuum zone, and a belt system takes the product from one zone to another. The vacuum is created by vacuum pumps, and the whole system is controlled by a programmable logic controller.

In batch fryers, the frying oil has to be replaced quite often as it is sensitive to temperature changes. Continuous vacuum fryers lead to a longer lifetime of the frying oil and therefore lower the production costs. Vacuum fryers can also reduce oil content in fried foods. The amount of reduced oil content, usually 1–3%, depends on the type of vacuum fryer.

== See also ==
- List of cooking appliances
- List of deep fried foods
