= Skimmer (utensil) =

Kitchen utensil used for skimming

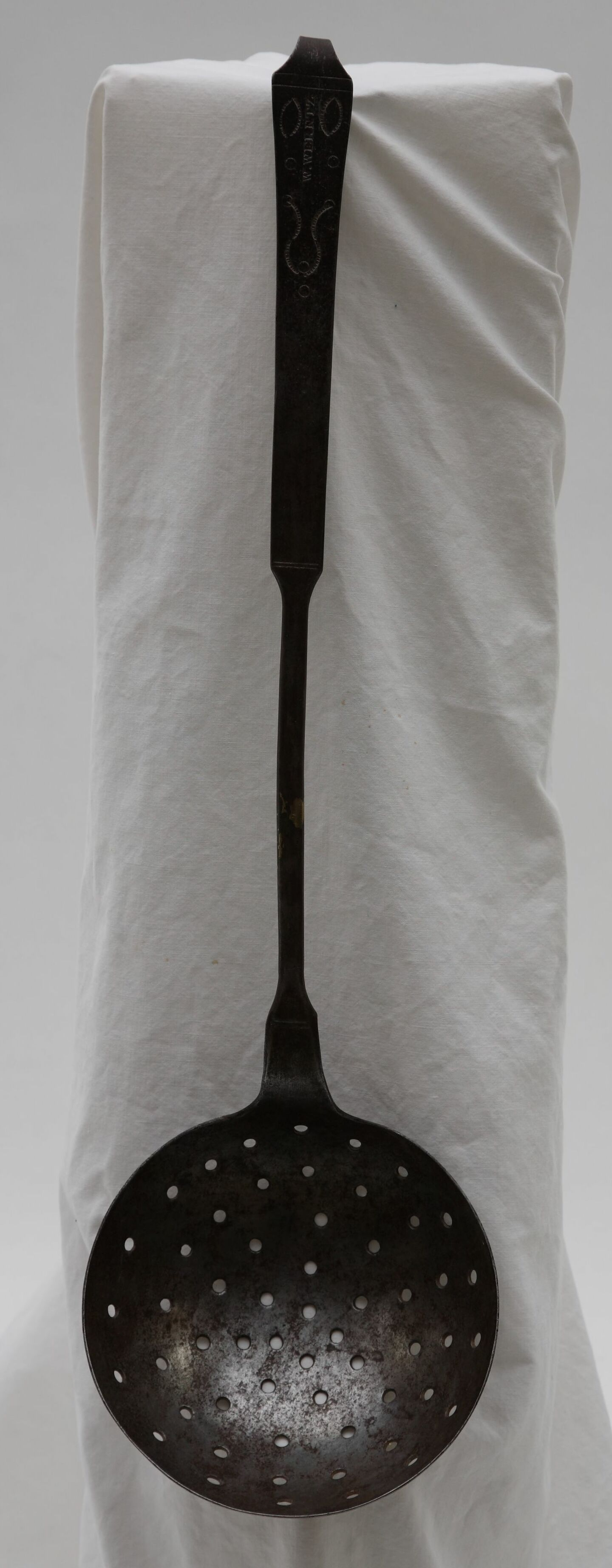
Skimmer, 1830

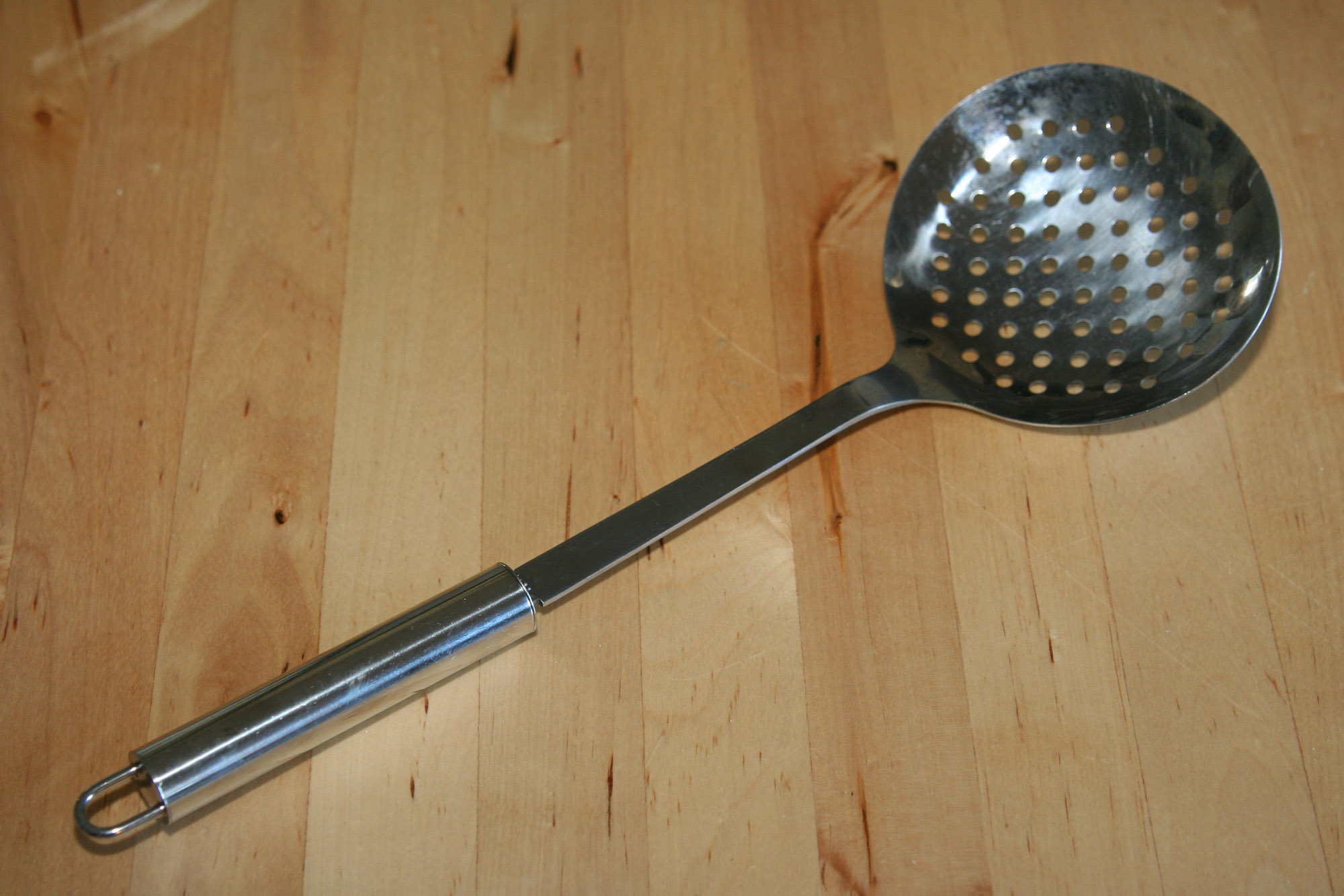
A metallic skimmer.

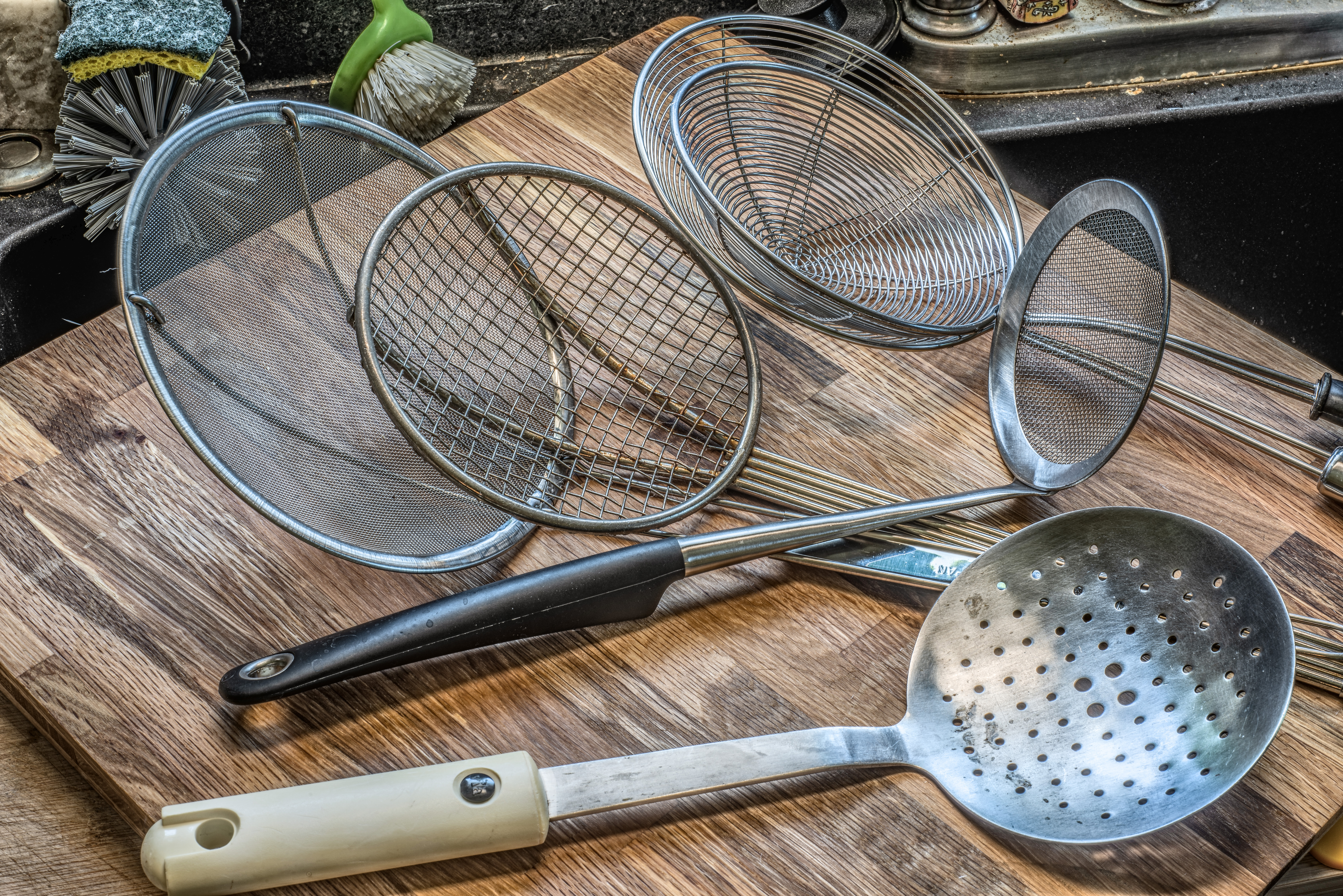
Metal hand-held (ladle-style) skimmers come in a large variety of forms, five of which are shown here.

A skimmer is a flat, sieve-like scoop or spoon used for skimming cooking liquids or lifting ripened cream from milk, such as a spider used in Chinese cuisine.

Skimmers are widely used in India, Bangladesh and Pakistan. In India, the skimmer is known as a "jhara" and is used in different cuisines, most actively in the making of fried foods such as sweets. Local street food stalls use it to make fried food items like bondas and medu vadas. In these countries, different types of skimmers can be obtained based on their use cases.

== See also ==
- Slotted spoon
- Ami jakushi
