= Pastry blender =

Cooking utensil

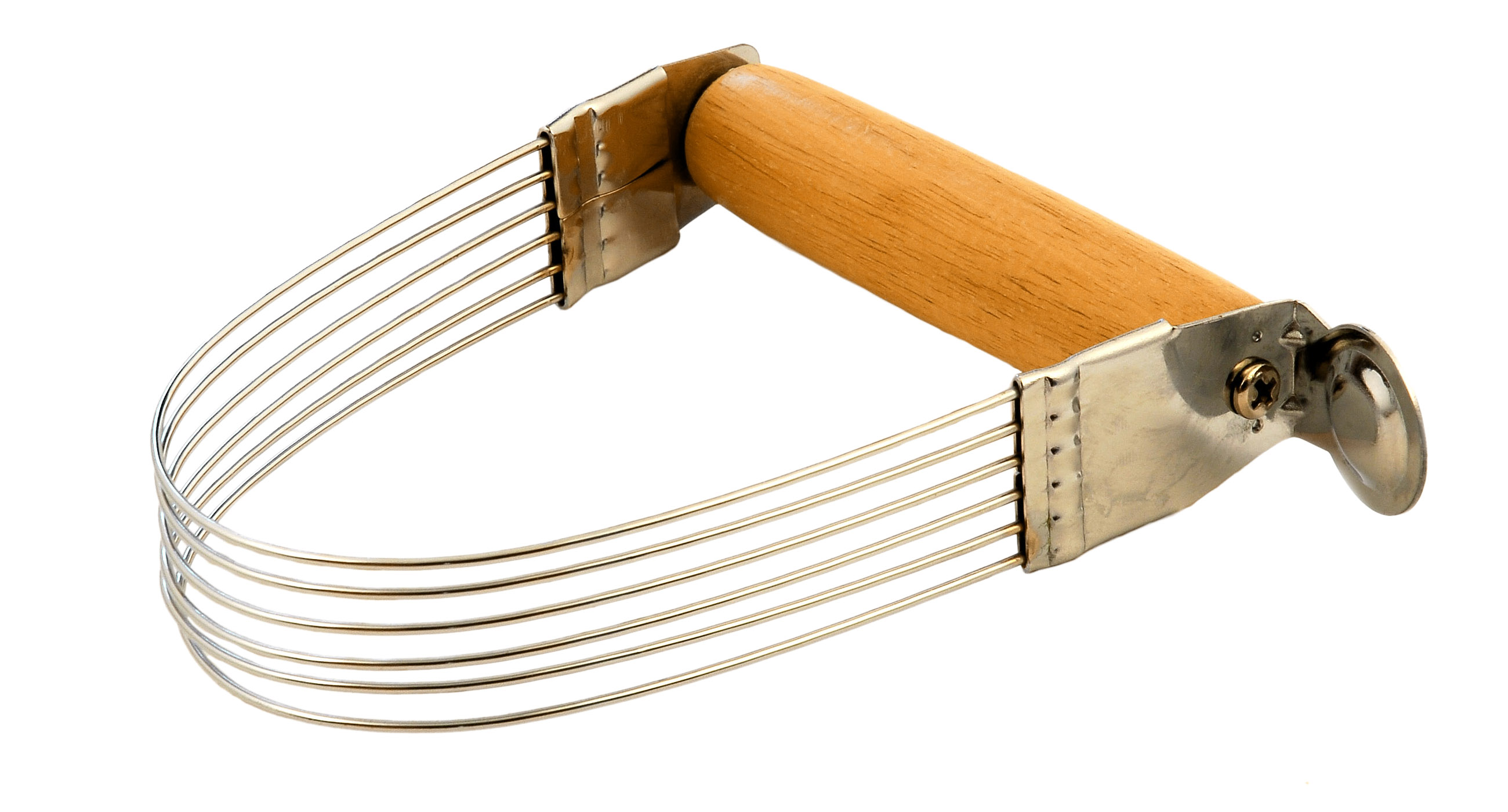
Pastry blender

A pastry blender, or pastry cutter, is a device used to mix a hard (solid) fat into flour in order to make pastries. The tool is usually made of narrow metal strips or wires attached to a handle, and is used by pressing down on the items to be mixed (known as "cutting in"). It is also used to break these fats (shortening, butter, lard) into smaller pieces. The blending of fat into flour at this stage impacts the amount of water that will be needed to bind the pastry into a dough.

== See also ==
- Dough scraper
- Dough blender
- Whisk
