= Slotted spoon =

Kind of spoon

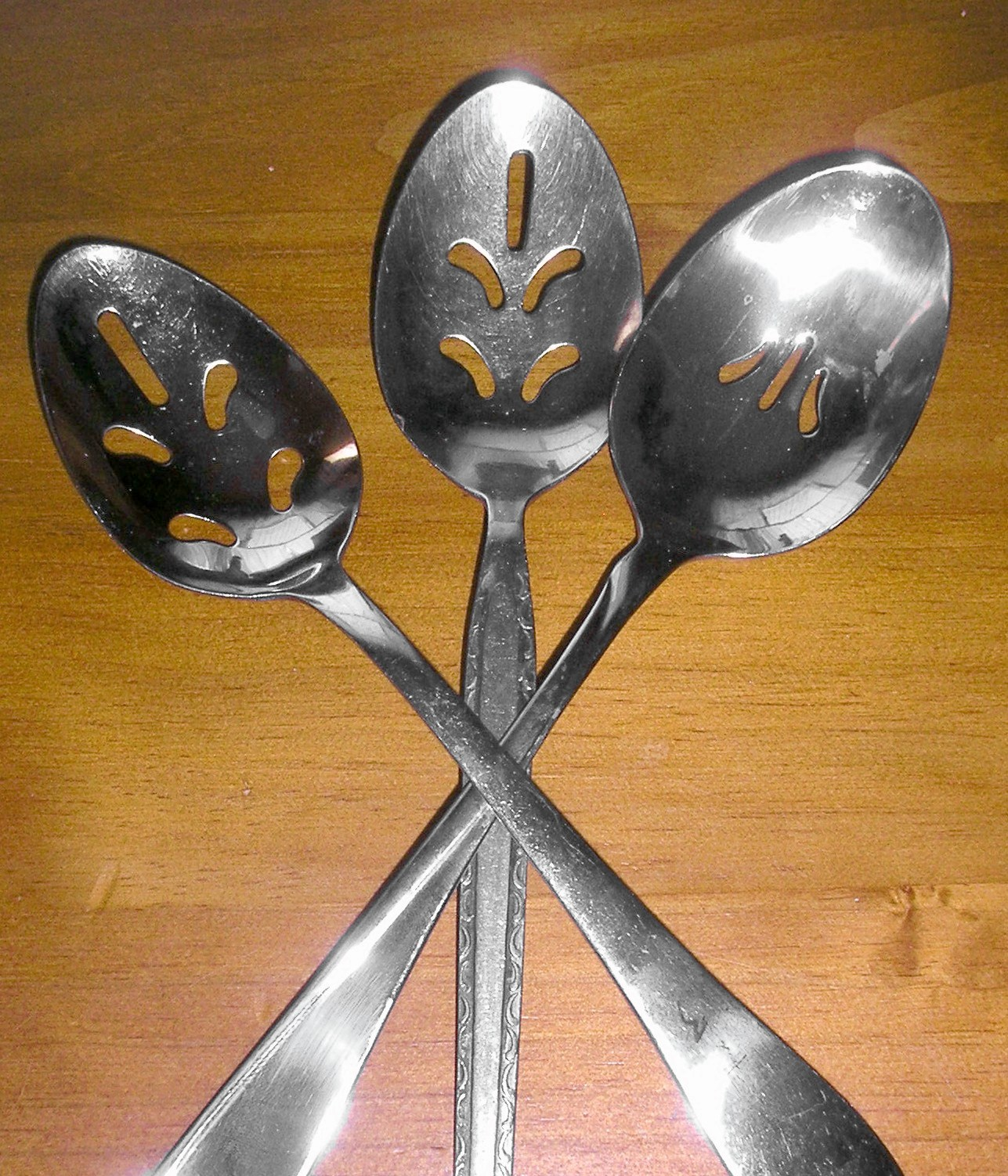
Three examples of typical stainless steel slotted spoons

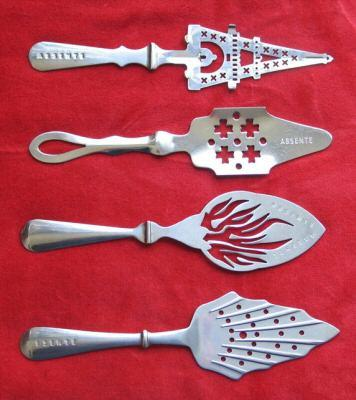
Special slotted spoons used to prepare absinthe

A slotted spoon is a spoon implement used in food preparation. The term can be used to describe any spoon with slots, holes or other openings in the bowl of the spoon which let liquid pass through while preserving the larger solids on top. It is similar in function to a sieve; however, a ladle-sized slotted spoon is most typically used to retrieve items from a cooking liquid while preserving the liquid in the pot, while table-sized slotted spoons are often used to serve foods prepared or packaged in juices, such as canned fruit and vegetables.

One peculiar example of a slotted spoon is used in the traditional absinthe preparation ritual. A special absinthe spoon with a disproportionately weighted, often ornately decorated, and the mostly flat bowl is balanced upon the rim of a glass, on which is placed a sugar cube and through which ice water is poured or dripped into the drink. The slots in the spoon ensure that only fully dissolved sugar reaches the beverage, and the slow trickle of water accentuates the appearance of the louche.

== See also ==
- Skimmer (utensil)
- Runcible spoon
