= Baking in ancient Rome =

Baking was a popular profession and source of food in ancient Rome. Many ancient Roman baking techniques were developed due to Greek bakers who traveled to Rome following the Third Macedonian War (171–168 BC). Ancient Roman bakers could make large quantities of money. This may have contributed to receiving a negative reputation. Bakers used tools such as the fornax, testum, thermospodium, and the clibanus to make bread. Most Roman breads were made using sourdough. The most common way to leaven bread was using flour mixed with grain.

== History ==
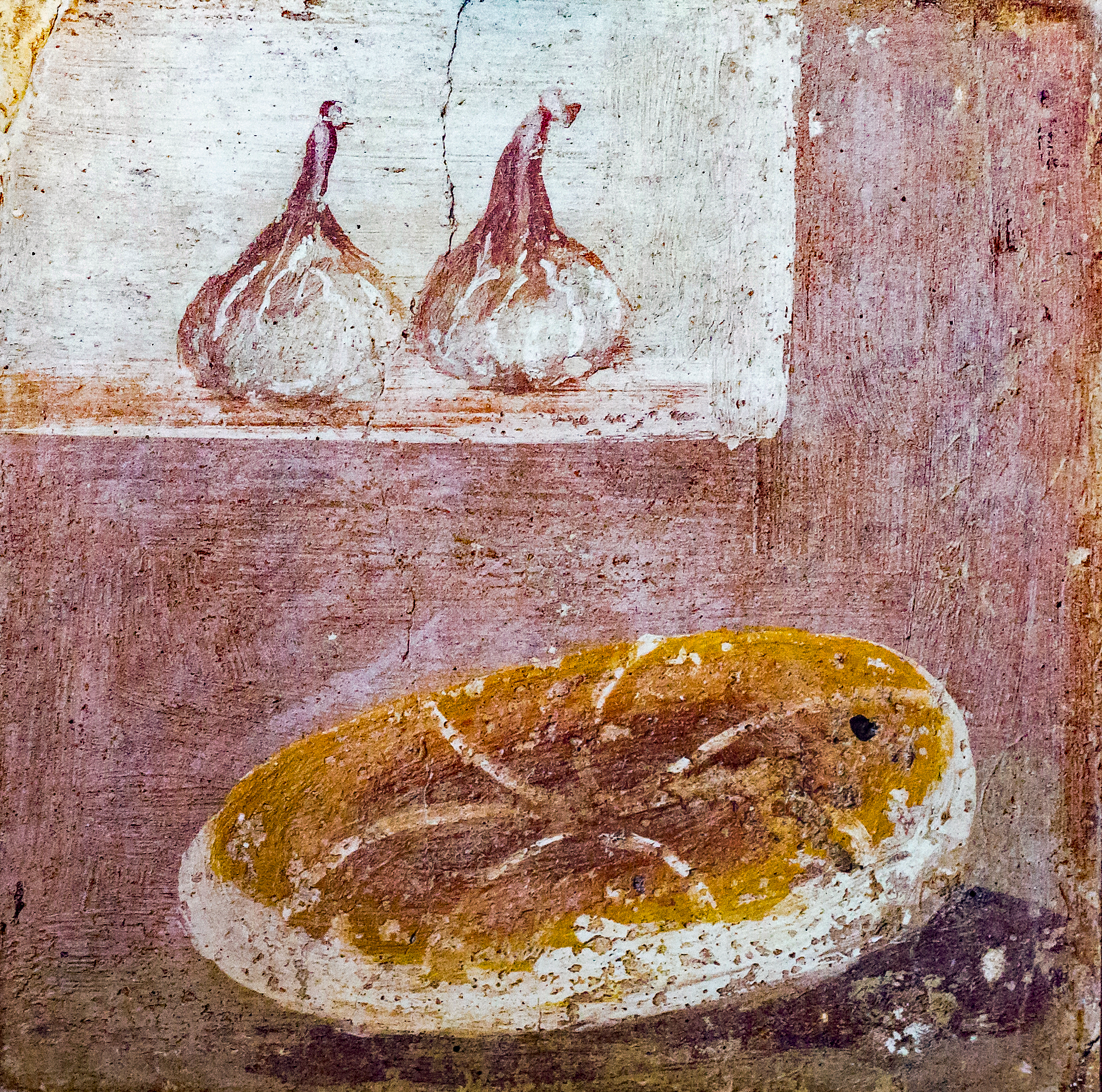
Still life with bread and figs, wall painting from Herculaneum

The Romans had eaten porridge and baked bread for around six hundred years after the founding of Rome. In 171 BC, during the Third Macedonian War, the arrival of Greek bakers established the first professional bakers, known as the pistores, in Rome. It was in ancient Rome where bread and pastries first began to be mass produced.

== Process ==
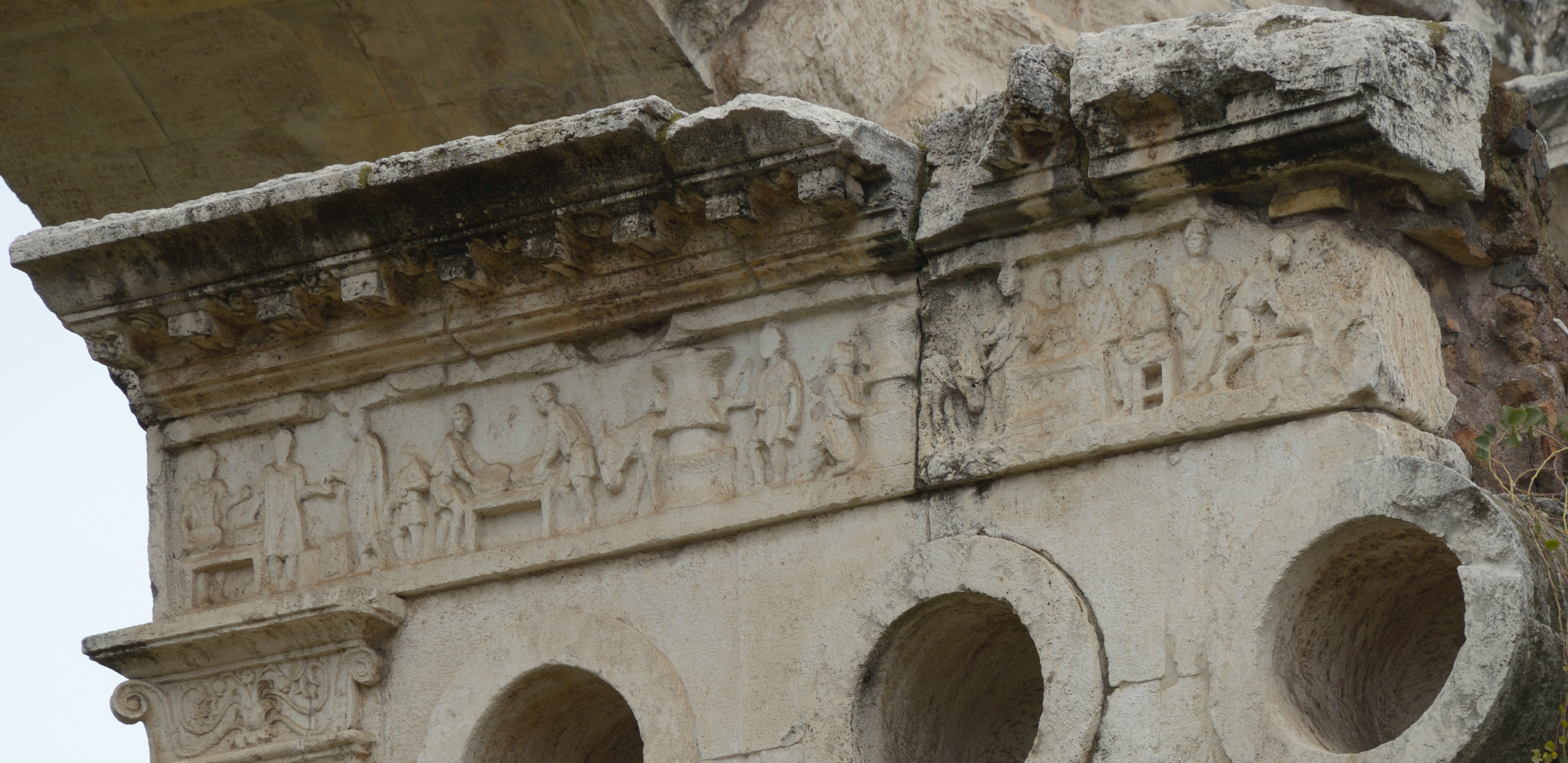
Frieze on the Tomb of Eurysaces the Baker, depicting bread being prepared.

Archaeological research conducted in Britain identified five different kinds of Roman baking, including baking in the ashes, baking surrounding hot ashes, the sub testu method, and baking in earthenware vessels. The most basic method of baking was cooking in ashes. The hot ashes and tiles were used to heat the bread. The sub testu method involved baking bread underneath a hot cover or hot coals. These baking covers are typically ceramics with pie-shaped lids and foot-long sides. Although none of the examples have handles or holes at the top, some have flanges on the sides. Bread could also be cooked in earthenware vessels. Pastry cooks were known as pastillarium and bakers of sweetmeats and cakes were termed dulciarius or crustularius. These were respected professions in ancient Rome. By the end of the Republic private bakers known as pistores used mills to mass produce bread. Trajan is said to have established a collegium pistorum to help ensure the continuous supply of bread. According to Pliny the Elder's Natural History women were the primary bakers in most families. It was a common practice to use slaves or criminals as workers in bakeries.

=== Ingredients ===
Ancient Roman bread was typically made from sourdough. White raised bread was preferred over unleavened bread; the latter was associated with the lower classes. Sourdough bread was made by mixing flour with water, and leaving the mix in the open air, to be colonised by wild, airborne yeasts. If this "starter" was successful, a small amount was retained uncooked, to be added to the next batch. The rest was baked. A good starter was handled with care. It could be re-used indefinitely, and, as much as the flour itself, determined the quality of the bread. Other, less popular leavening agents included soured barley cakes, beer foam, or fermented grape juice. Ash cake was the ancient Roman term for food produced in the ashes of a fire. This type of food may be the ancestor of Italian flatbread focaccia. Many baked goods included large quantities of honey and oil. Leaves were used to flavor the bread. The Romans adopted a Gaulic technique of adding froth to bread dough to make light leavened bread.

== Equipment ==
The furnus was developed by the end of the Republic and spread due to a greater need for baking. It likely evolved from the fornax, which was a type of corn-dryer. In Pompeii the furni usually use a domed shape or a beehive as a baking mound. This would be encased in a large brick structure used to insulate the mound. Beneath the openings in the baking chambers were located ledges which were likely used to store ashes. The testum was used by the ancient Romans as a portable oven. It was used by wealthier people in ancient Rome. The testum was an earthenware pot used to bake homemade bread. Ancient Roman bakers would heat it by creating a fire underneath the dome on a baking stone. Following this, the ashes were removed, hot coals were placed on the dome to maintain the heat, the dome was replaced, and bread was placed upon the hot stone. Sheet pans were also used to heat the testum although it would not heat the bread as quickly. Like the testum, the thermospodium was used as a portable oven and was owned by wealthy families. It was a type of small oven similar to a brazier. One thermospodium found at Pompeii was made from a square box resting on four decorative legs. The thermospodium was likely used for convenience rather than as part of an extensive food preparation ritual. This type of oven was used by the Roman military to supply food to its soldiers. Another piece of baking equipment was known as the clibanus. Although frequently mentioned in Roman literature, there is little evidence as to its function or role. It is unclear what differentiated it from the testum. It was a rounded pot with a wider bottom than top and heated with a fire located underneath it. Flanges were sometimes placed on the sides of the vessel and were used to grip onto. It may also have had a central opening or small circular vents in the sides which were used to regulate the heat. The clibanus may have been portable. It is also possible the term clibanus referred to a wide variety of vessels, possibly including the testum. Decorations were sometimes placed on clibani. The most common decoration was incised concentric circles, wave patterns, rouletted concentric circles of triangles or rectangles, gouges, and slashes.

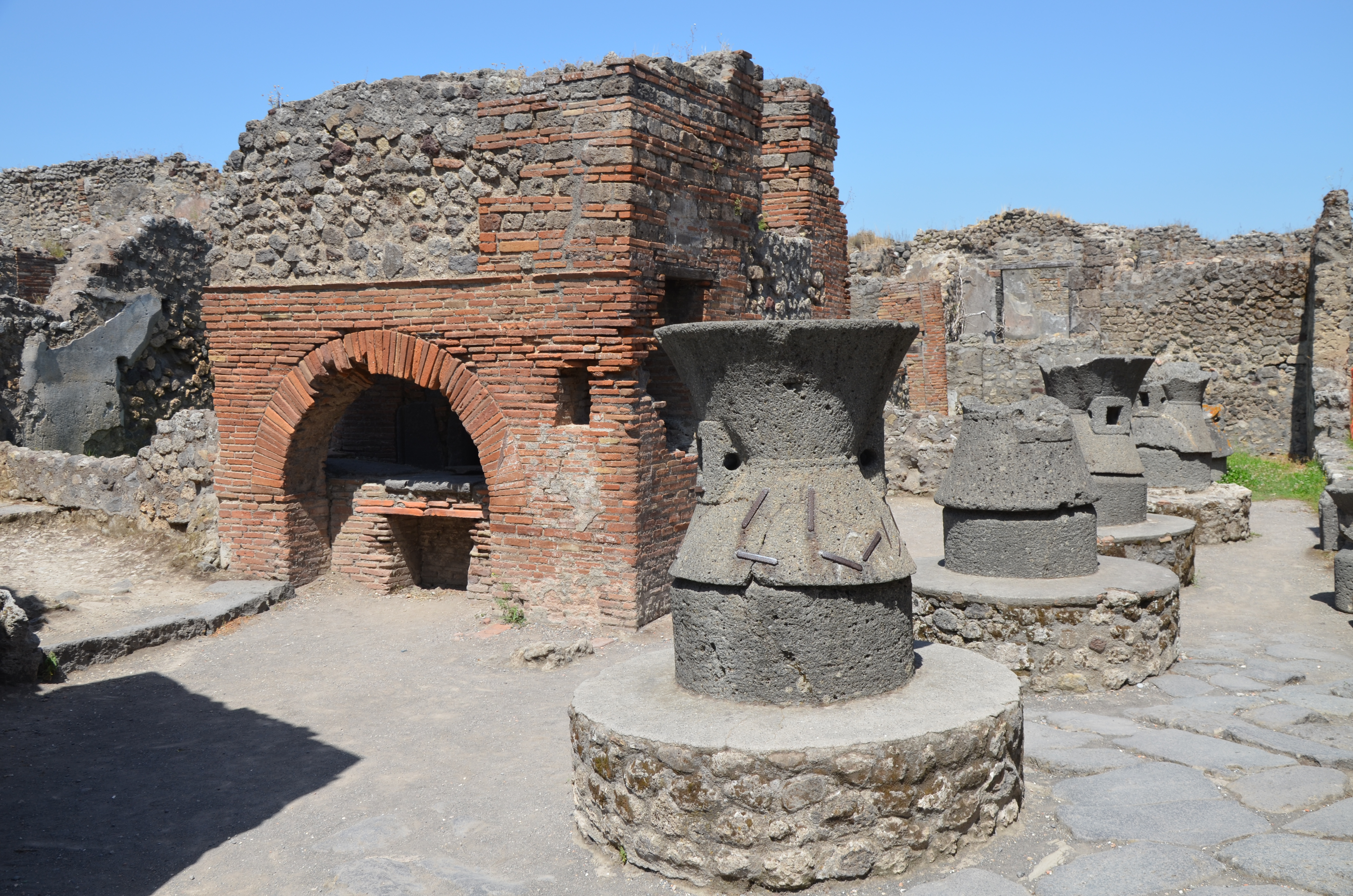
A mill and bakery complex at Pompeii

== Reputation ==
There is evidence that baking was widespread in ancient Rome. Archaeologists have found over thirty commercial bakeries in Pompeii. Bakers could be identified through imagery such as millstones or donkeys. Wealthy Romans would purchase domestic slaves and use them as bakers. This was seen as a sign of aristocratic status. Bakers were also associated with servility. Cicero considered baking to be a lowly occupation. In Plautus' Poenulus bakers were said to work with prostitutes. Augustus was mocked for being the descendant of an African baker. The negativity towards bakers was likely influenced by the large quantities of wealth bakers would assume.

== See also ==
- History of bread
