= Baking =

Food-producing method

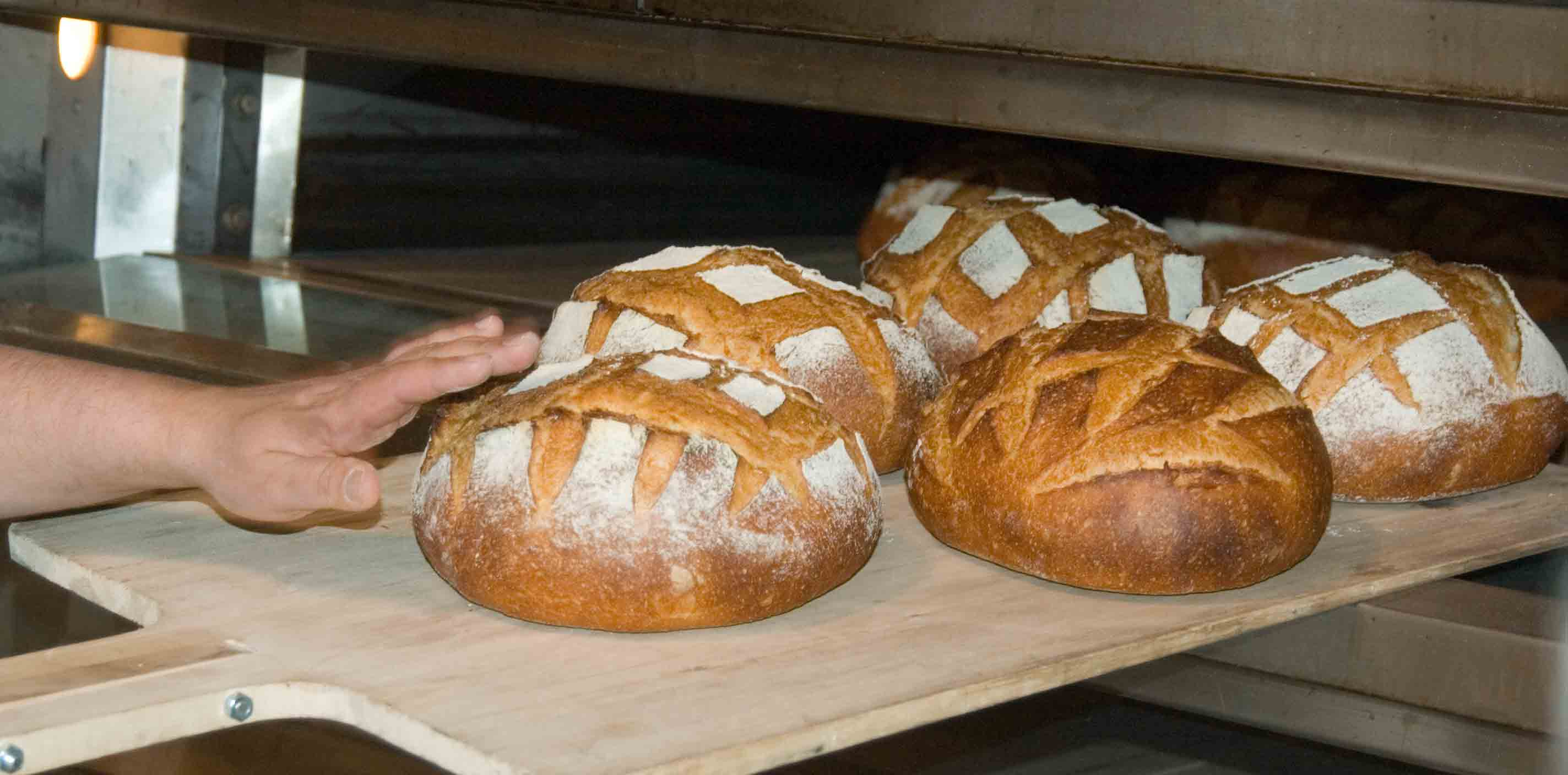
Freshly baked bread

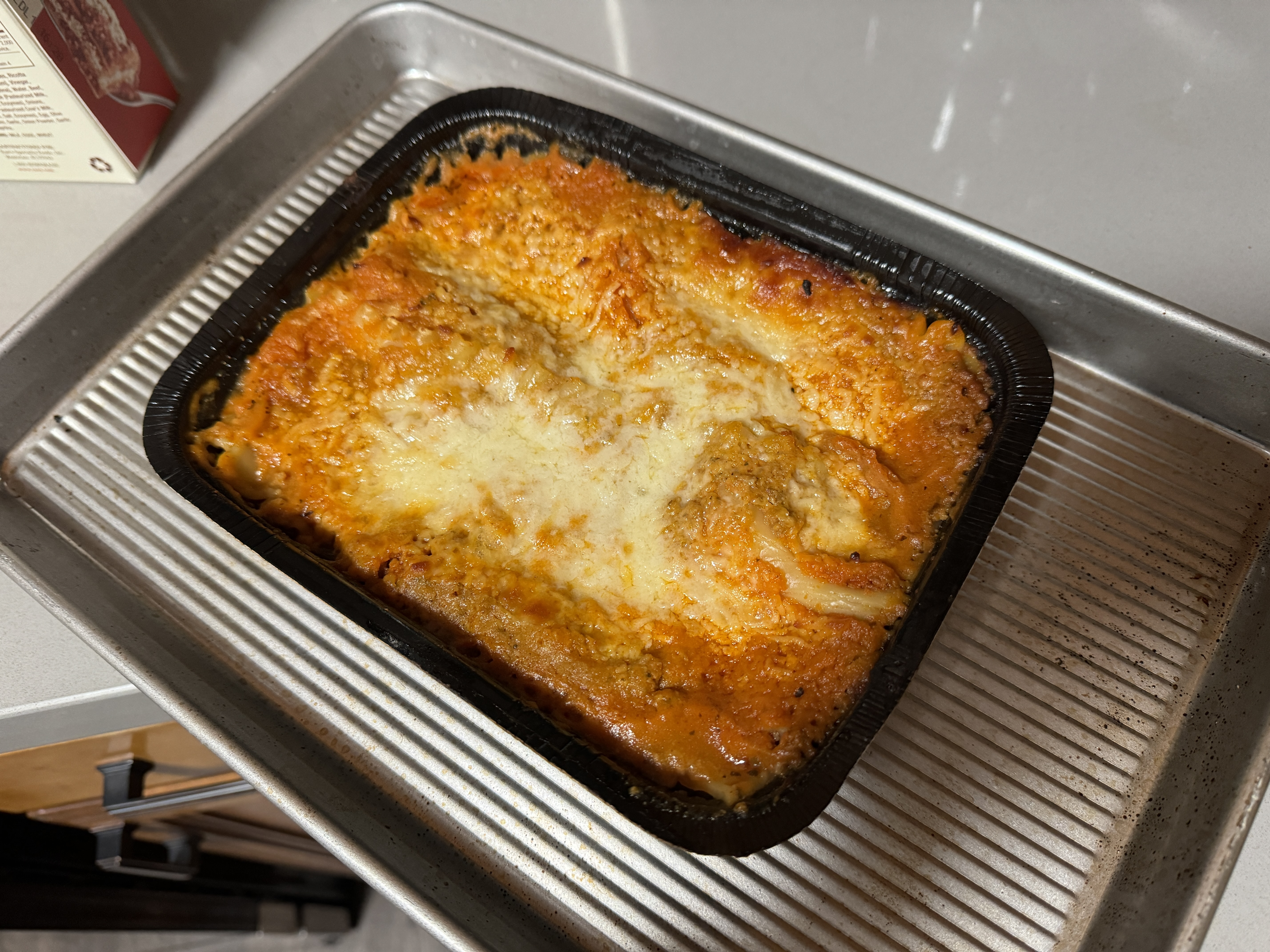
Lasagna that has been baked

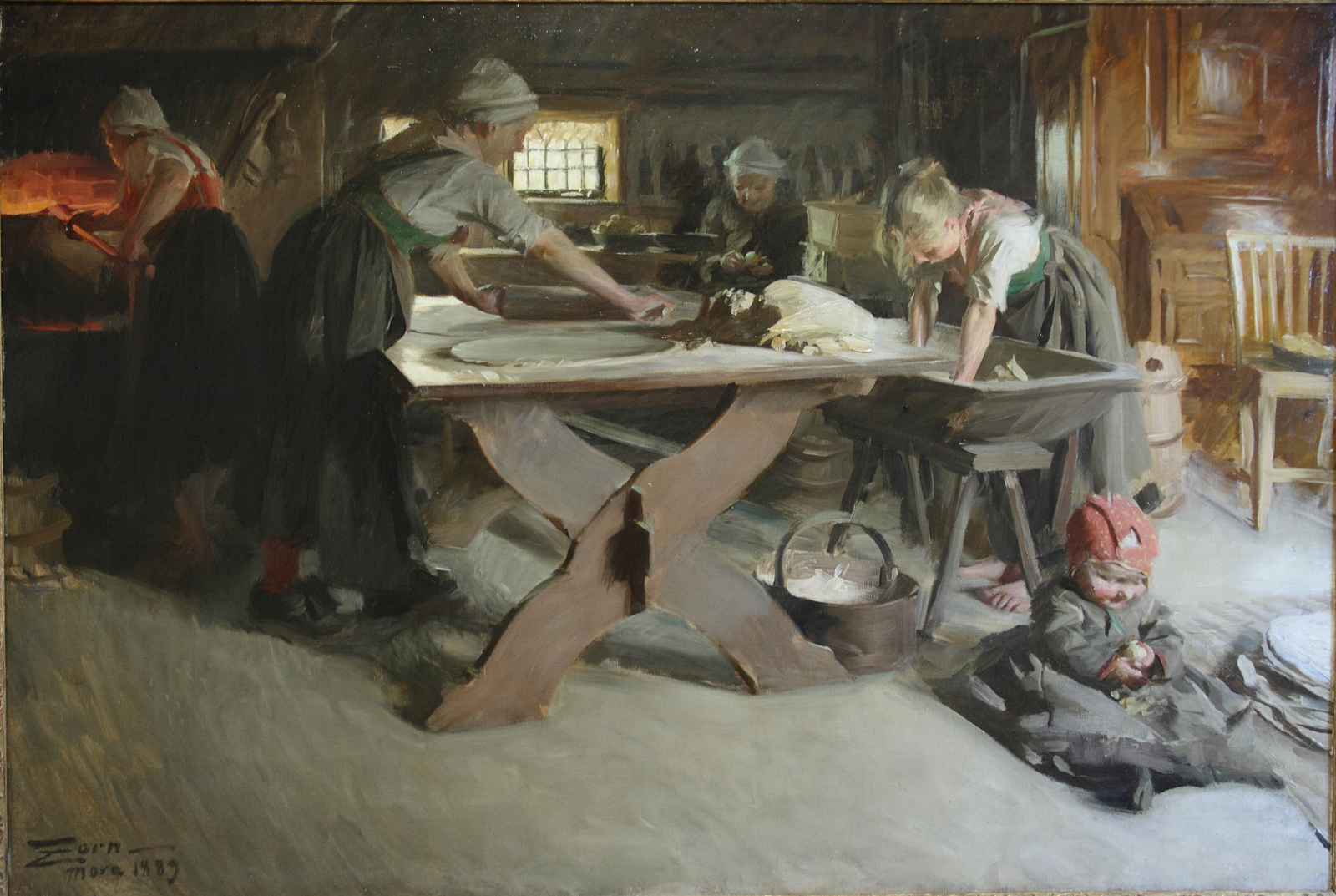
Anders Zorn – Bread baking (1889)

Baking is a method of preparing food using dry heat, usually in an oven, over hot ashes, or on hot stones. The most commonly baked foods in 2025 were bread and rolls. Heat is gradually transferred from the surface of unbaked goods to their center, typically at elevated temperatures surpassing 300 °F (148 °C). Dry heat cooking imparts a distinctive richness to foods through the processes of caramelization and surface browning. As heat travels through, it transforms batters and doughs into baked goods and more with a firm dry crust and a softer center. Baking can be combined with grilling to produce a hybrid barbecue variant by using both methods simultaneously, or one after the other. Baking is related to barbecuing because the concept of the masonry oven is similar to that of a smoke pit.

Baking has traditionally been performed at home for day-to-day meals and in bakeries and restaurants for local consumption. When production was industrialized, baking was automated by machines in large factories. The art of baking remains a fundamental skill and is important for nutrition, as baked goods, especially bread, are a common and important food, both from an economic and cultural point of view. A person who prepares baked goods as a profession is called a baker.

== Foods and techniques ==
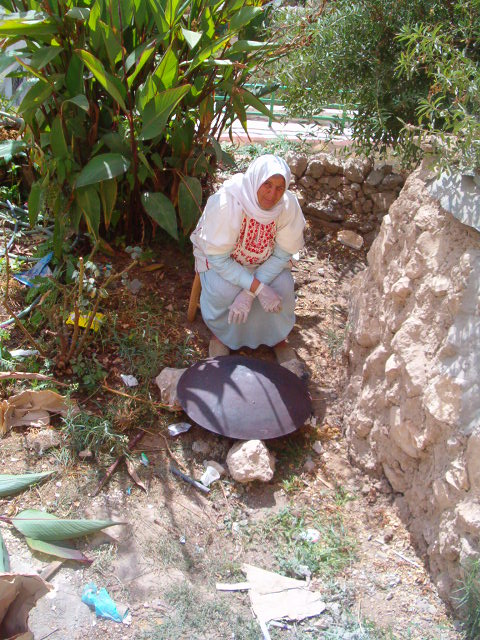
A Palestinian woman baking markook bread on tava or Saj oven in Artas, Bethlehem, Palestine

All types of food can be baked, but some require special care and protection from direct heat. Various techniques have been developed to provide this protection. Chefs and other cookbook authors often include chapters dedicated to baking techniques or tips in addition to recipes in their books.

In addition to bread, baking is used to prepare cakes, pastries, pies, tarts, quiches, cookies, scones, crackers, pretzels, and more. These popular items are known collectively as "baked goods," and are often sold at a bakery, which is a store that carries only baked goods, or at markets, grocery stores, farmers' markets or through other venues.

Meats, including cured meats like ham and salami, can be baked whole. However, baking is typically reserved for meatloaf, smaller cuts of whole meat, or whole meats that are stuffed or coated with bread crumbs or buttermilk batter. Some foods are surrounded with moisture during baking by placing a small amount of liquid (such as water or broth) in the bottom of a closed pan, and letting it steam up around the food. Roasting is a term synonymous with baking, but traditionally denotes the cooking of whole animals or major cuts through exposure to dry heat; for instance, one bakes chicken parts but roasts the whole bird. One can bake pork or lamb chops but roasts the whole loin or leg. There are many exceptions to this rule of the two terms. Baking and roasting otherwise involve the same range of cooking times and temperatures. Another form of baking is the method known as en croûte (French for "in crust", referring to a pastry crust), which protects the food from direct heat and seals the natural juices inside. Meat, poultry, game, fish or vegetables can be prepared by baking en croûte. Well-known examples include Beef Wellington, where the beef is encased in pastry before baking; pâté en croûte, where the terrine is encased in pastry before baking; and the Vietnamese variant, a meat-filled pastry called pâté chaud. The en croûte method also allows meat to be baked by burying it in the embers of a fire—a favorite method of cooking venison. Salt can also be used to make a protective crust that is not eaten. Another method of protecting food from the heat while it is baking is to cook it en papillote (French for "in parchment"). In this method, the food is covered by baking paper (or aluminum foil) to protect it while it is being baked. The cooked parcel of food is sometimes served unopened, allowing diners to discover the contents for themselves.

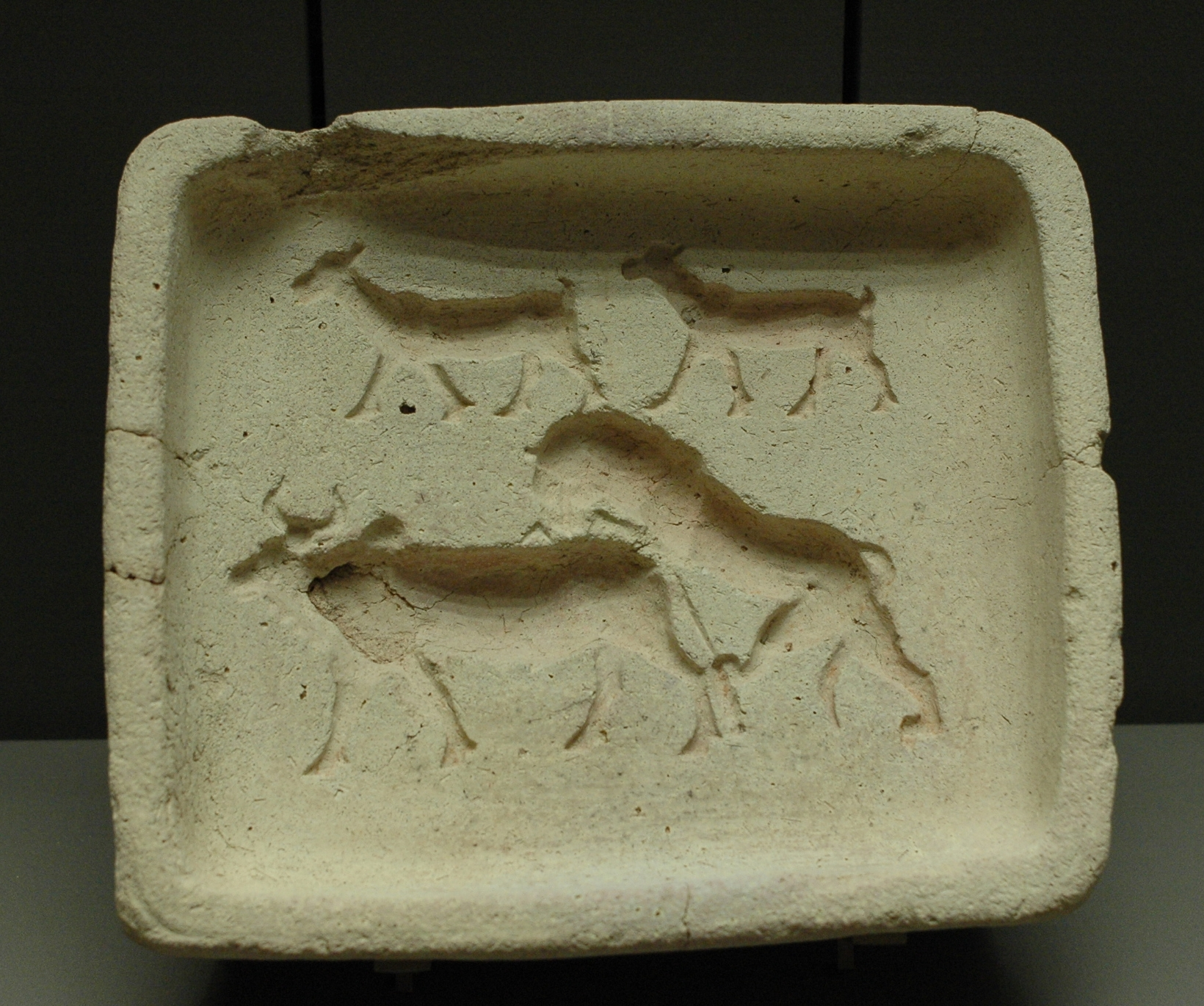
A terracotta baking mould for pastry or bread, representing goats and a lion attacking a cow. Early 2nd millennium BC, Royal palace at Mari, Syria

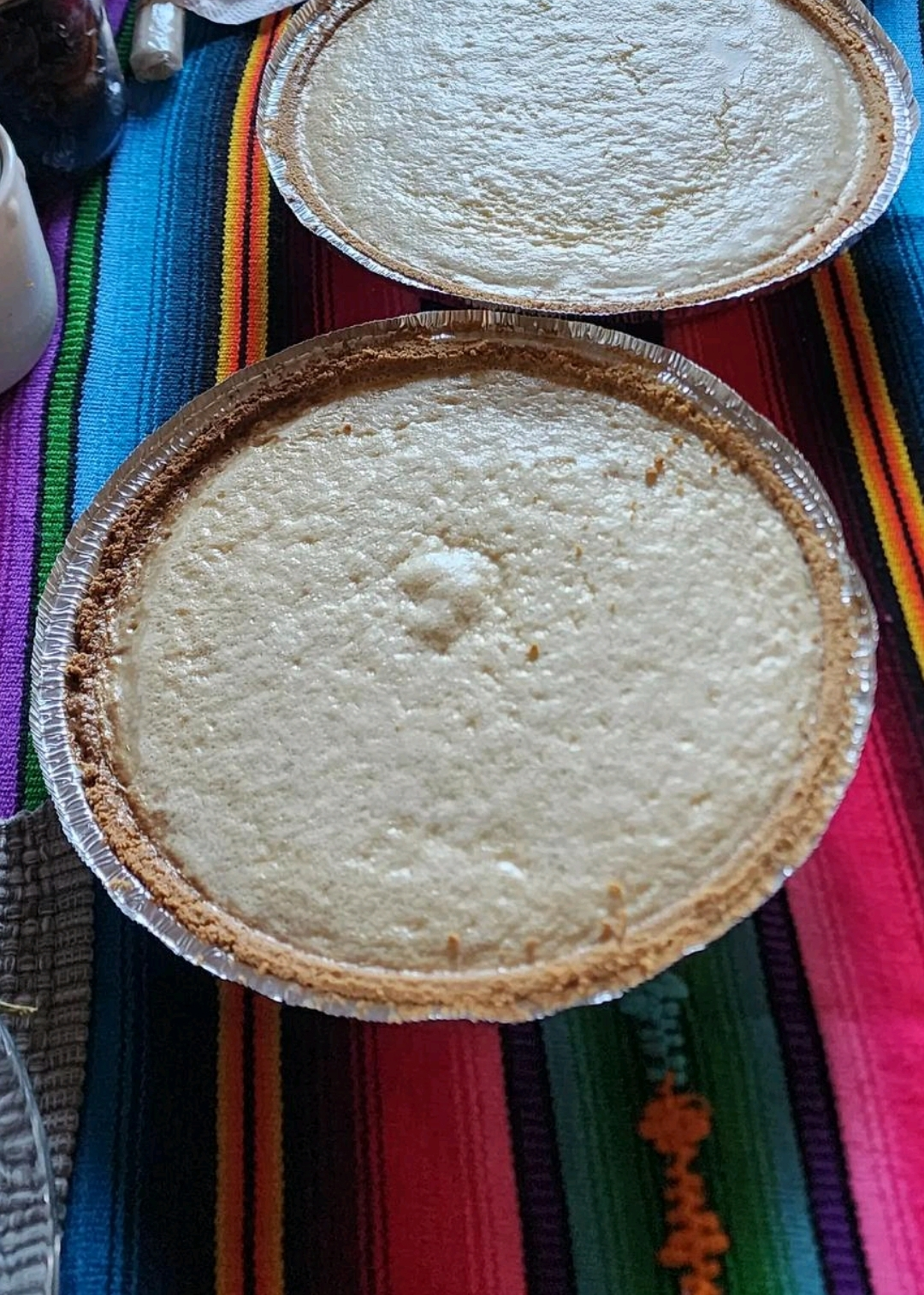
A cheesecake cooling down after being baked.

Eggs can also be used in baking to produce savory or sweet dishes. In combination with dairy products especially cheese, they are often prepared as a dessert. For example, although a baked custard can be made using starch (in the form of flour, cornflour, arrowroot, or potato flour), the flavor of the dish is much more delicate if eggs are used as the thickening agent. Baked custards, such as crème caramel, are among the items that need protection from an oven's direct heat, and the bain-marie method serves this purpose. The cooking container is half-submerged in water in another, larger one so that the heat in the oven is more gently applied during the baking process. Baking a successful soufflé requires that the baking process be carefully controlled. The oven temperature must be absolutely even, and the oven space must not be shared with another dish. These factors, along with the theatrical effect of an air-filled dessert, have given this baked food a reputation for being a culinary achievement. Similarly, a good baking technique (and a good oven) is also needed to create a Baked Alaska because of the difficulty of baking hot meringue and cold ice cream at the same time.

Baking can also be used to prepare other foods such as pizzas, baked potatoes, baked apples, baked beans, some casseroles, and pasta dishes such as lasagne. Baked goods are not limited to being served warm or right after baking; some recipes, such as cheesecake, require cooling after being removed from the oven.

== History ==
=== Baking in ancient times ===
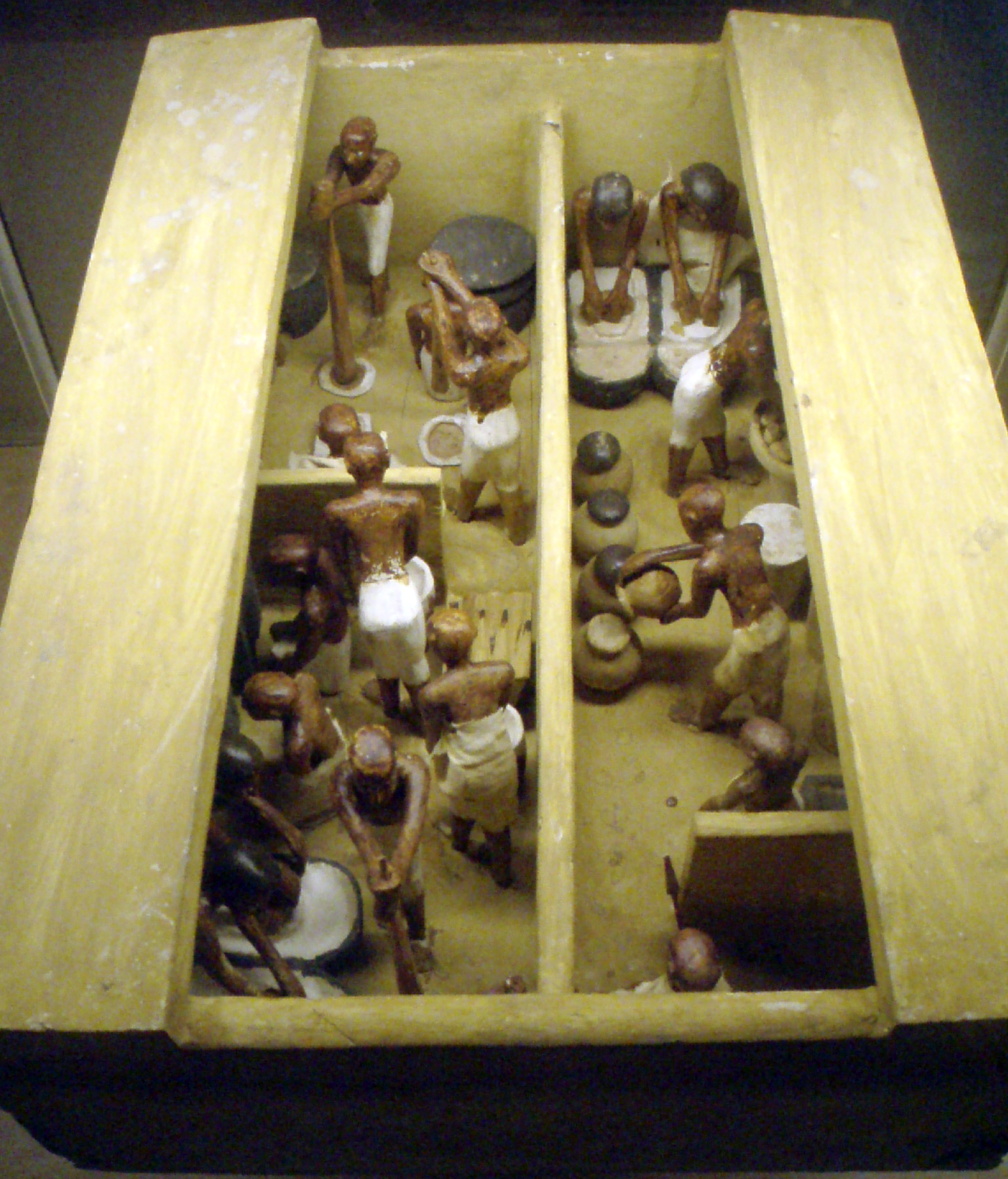
An Egyptian funerary model of a bakery and brewery (11th dynasty, circa 2009–1998 BC)

The earliest known form of baking occurred when humans took wild grass grains, soaked them in water, and mashed the mixture into a kind of broth-like paste. The paste was cooked by pouring it onto a flat, hot rock, resulting in a bread-like substance. Later, as humans mastered fire, they roasted the paste on hot embers, making bread-making more convenient as it could be done whenever fire was created. According to Britannica, the Ancient Egyptians invented the first ovens. They also baked bread using yeast, which they had previously been using to brew beer. By 2600 BCE, they were making bread in ways similar in principle to those of today. The book Bread for the Wilderness states that "Ovens and worktables have been discovered in archaeological digs from Turkey (Hacılar Höyük) to Palestine (Jericho (Tell es-Sultan)) and date back to 5600 BC."

Baking flourished during the Roman Empire. Beginning around 300 BC, the pastry cook became an occupation for Romans (known as the pastillarium) and became a respected profession because pastries were considered decadent, and Romans loved festivity and celebration. Thus, pastries were often cooked especially for large banquets, and any pastry cook who could invent new types of well-regarded treats was highly prized. Around 1 AD, there were more than three hundred pastry chefs in Rome, and Cato wrote about how they created all sorts of diverse foods and flourished professionally and socially because of their creations. Cato speaks of an enormous number of breads including; libum (cakes made with flour and honey, often sacrificed to gods), placenta (groats and cress), spira (modern day flour pretzels), scibilata (tortes), savillum (sweet cake), and globus apherica (fritters). A great selection of these, with many different variations, different ingredients, and varied patterns, were often found at banquets and dining halls. The Romans baked bread in an oven with its own chimney, and had mills to grind grain into flour. A bakers' guild, the Collegium Pistorum, was established in 168 BC in Rome.

== Commercial baking ==
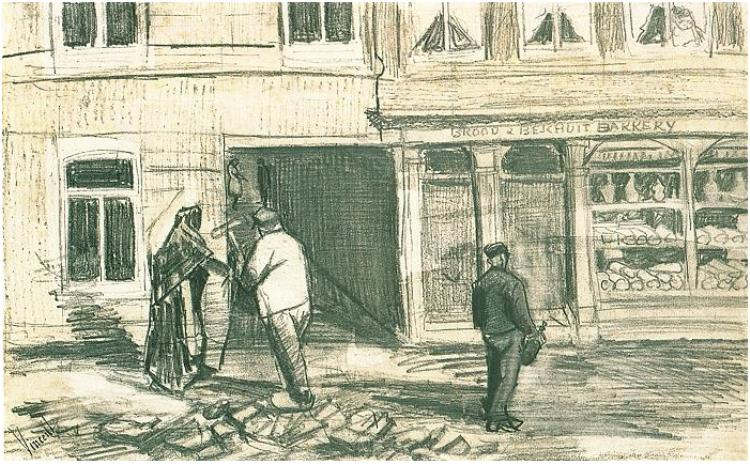
Vincent van Gogh – The Bakery in Noordstraat (1882)

Eventually, the Roman art of baking became known throughout Europe and eventually spread to eastern parts of Asia. By the 13th century in London, commercial trading, including baking, had many regulations attached. In the case of food, they were designed to create a system "so there was little possibility of false measures, adulterated food or shoddy manufactures". There were by that time twenty regulations applying to bakers alone, including that every baker had to have "the impression of his seal" upon bread.

Beginning in the 19th century, alternative leavening agents became more common, such as baking soda. Bakers often baked goods at home and then sold them in the streets. This scene was so common that Rembrandt, among others, painted a pastry chef selling pancakes in the streets of Germany, with children clamoring for a sample. In London, pastry chefs sold their goods from handcarts. This developed into a delivery system of baked goods to households and greatly increased demand as a result. In Paris, the first open-air café of baked goods was developed, and baking became an established art throughout the entire world.

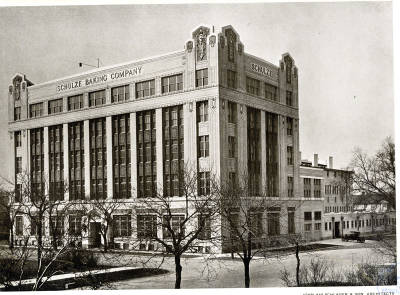
Schulze Baking Company Factory, Chicago (1914–15)

Every family used to prepare the bread for its own consumption, the trade of baking not having yet taken shape.

— Mrs Beeton

Baking eventually developed into a commercial industry using automated machinery which enabled more goods to be produced for widespread distribution. In the United States, the baking industry "was built on marketing methods used during feudal times and production techniques developed by the Romans." Some makers of snacks such as potato chips or crisps have produced baked versions of their snack products as an alternative to the usual cooking method of deep frying in an attempt to reduce their calorie or fat content. Baking has opened up doors to businesses such as cake shops and factories where the baking process is done with larger amounts in large, open furnaces. Researchers are also developing and evaluating new techniques and approaches to help the industry with quality control.

The aroma and texture of baked goods as they come out of the oven are strongly appealing, but is a quality that is quickly lost. Since the flavour and appeal largely depend on freshness, commercial producers have to compensate by using food additives as well as imaginative labeling. As more and more baked goods are purchased from commercial suppliers, producers try to capture that original appeal by adding the label "home-baked." Such attempts seek to make an emotional link to the remembered freshness of baked goods as well as to attach positive associations the purchaser has with the idea of "home" to the bought product. Freshness is such an important quality that restaurants, although they are commercial (and not domestic) preparers of food, bake their own products. For example, scones at The Ritz London Hotel "are not baked until early afternoon on the day they are to be served, to make sure they are as fresh as possible."

== Equipment ==
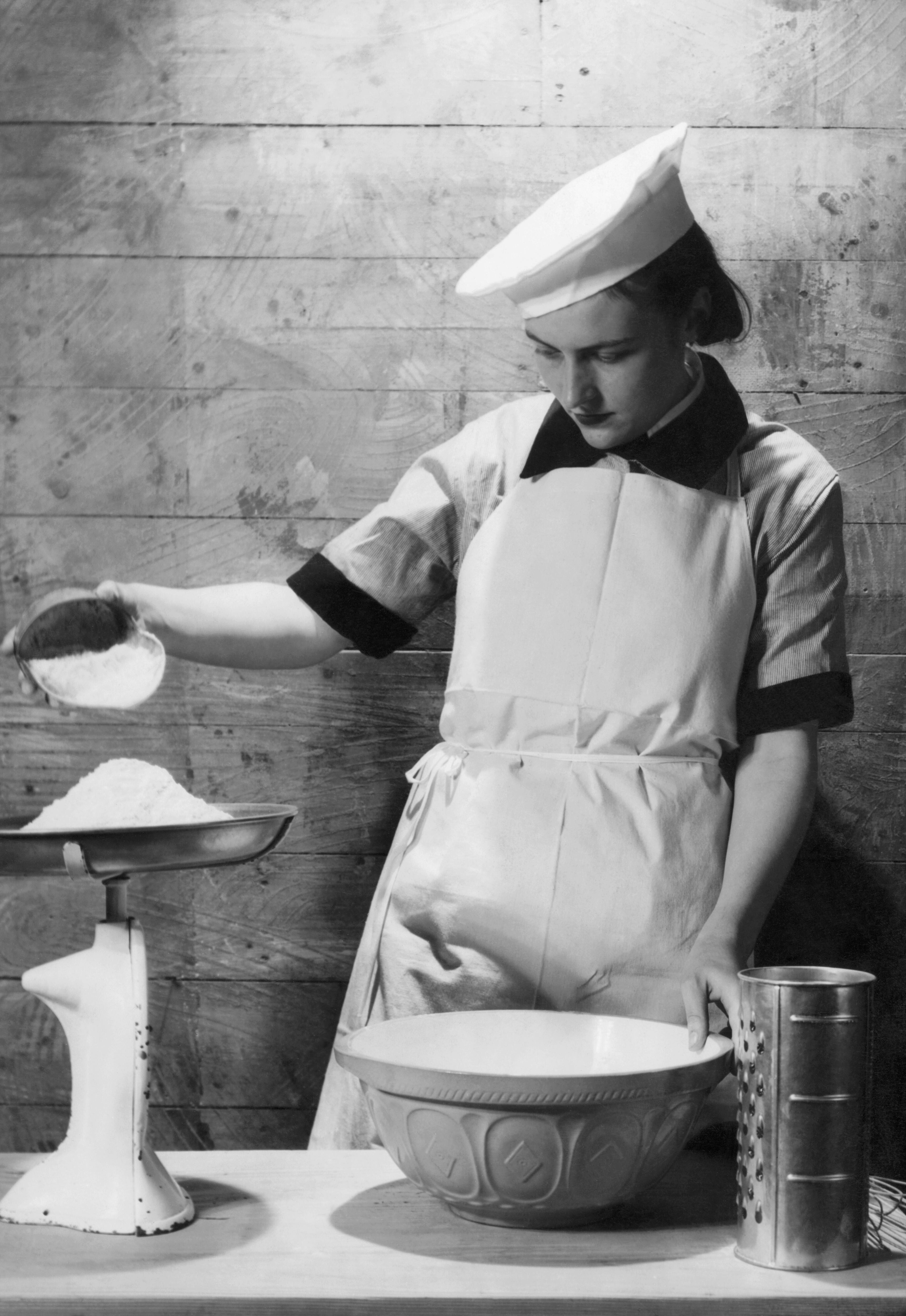
A baker with a mixing bowl, grater, and a scale.

Baking needs an enclosed space for heating – typically in an oven. Formerly, primitive clay ovens were in use. The fuel can be supplied by wood, coal, gas, or electricity. Adding and removing items from an oven may be done by hand with an oven mitt or by a peel, a long handled tool specifically used for that purpose.

Many commercial ovens are equipped with two heating elements: one for baking, using convection and thermal conduction to heat the food, and one for broiling or grilling, heating mainly by radiation. Another piece of equipment still used for baking is the Dutch oven. "Also called a bake kettle, bastable, bread oven, fire pan, bake oven kail pot, tin kitchen, roasting kitchen, doufeu (French: "gentle fire") or feu de compagne (French: "country oven") [it] originally replaced the cooking jack as the latest fireside cooking technology," combining "the convenience of pot-oven and hangover oven."

Asian cultures have adopted steam baskets to produce the effect of baking while reducing the amount of fat needed.

Other equipment and tools needed for baking precision include a method for measuring ingredients. Ideally, a scale accurate to the gram is used, as exact measurements provide the best results, but some bakers rely on measuring cups and measuring spoons. Cookbooks often include pages with illustrations or images of equipment to help bakers identify which items they needs for specific recipes.

Digital kitchen scales are also popular in baking where precise measurements are a must for dry ingredients. The tare function simplifies the process by allowing multiple ingredients to be measured in the same mixing bowl, resetting the scale to zero between each addition and eliminating the need for extra measuring tools.

== Process ==
Baking bread at the Roscheider Hof Open Air Museum

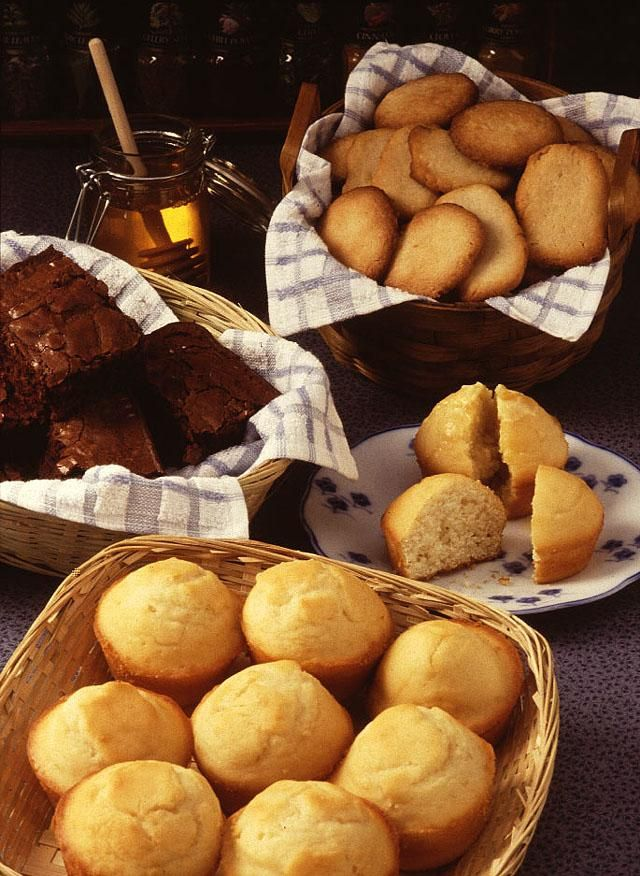
Baked goods

Eleven events occur concurrently during baking, some of which (such as starch gelatinization) would not occur at room temperature.

1. Fats melt
2. Gases form and expand
3. Microorganisms die
4. Sugar dissolves
5. Egg, milk, and gluten proteins coagulate
6. Starches gelatinize or solidify
7. Liquids evaporate
8. Caramelization and Maillard browning occur on crust
9. Enzymes are denatured
10. Changes occur to nutrients
11. Pectin breaks down

Controlling heat in an oven is a critical step of the process. The dry heat of baking changes the form of starches in the food and causes its outer surfaces to brown, giving it an attractive appearance and taste. The browning is caused by the caramelization of sugars and the Maillard reaction. Maillard browning occurs when "sugars break down in the presence of proteins. Because foods contain many different types of sugars and proteins, Maillard browning contributes to the flavour of a wide range of foods, including nuts, roast beef, and baked bread." The moisture is never entirely "sealed in"; over time, an item being baked will become dry. This is often an advantage, especially in situations where drying is the desired outcome, like drying herbs or roasting certain types of vegetables.

The baking process does not require any fat to be used to cook in an oven. When baking, consideration must be given to the amount of fat that is contained in the food item. Higher levels of fat such as margarine, butter, lard, or vegetable shortening will cause an item to spread out during the baking process.

With the passage of time, breads harden and become stale. This is not primarily due to moisture being lost from the baked products, but more a reorganization of the way in which the water and starch are associated over time. This process is similar to recrystallization and is promoted by storage at cool temperatures, such as in a domestic refrigerator or freezer.

== Cultural and religious significance ==
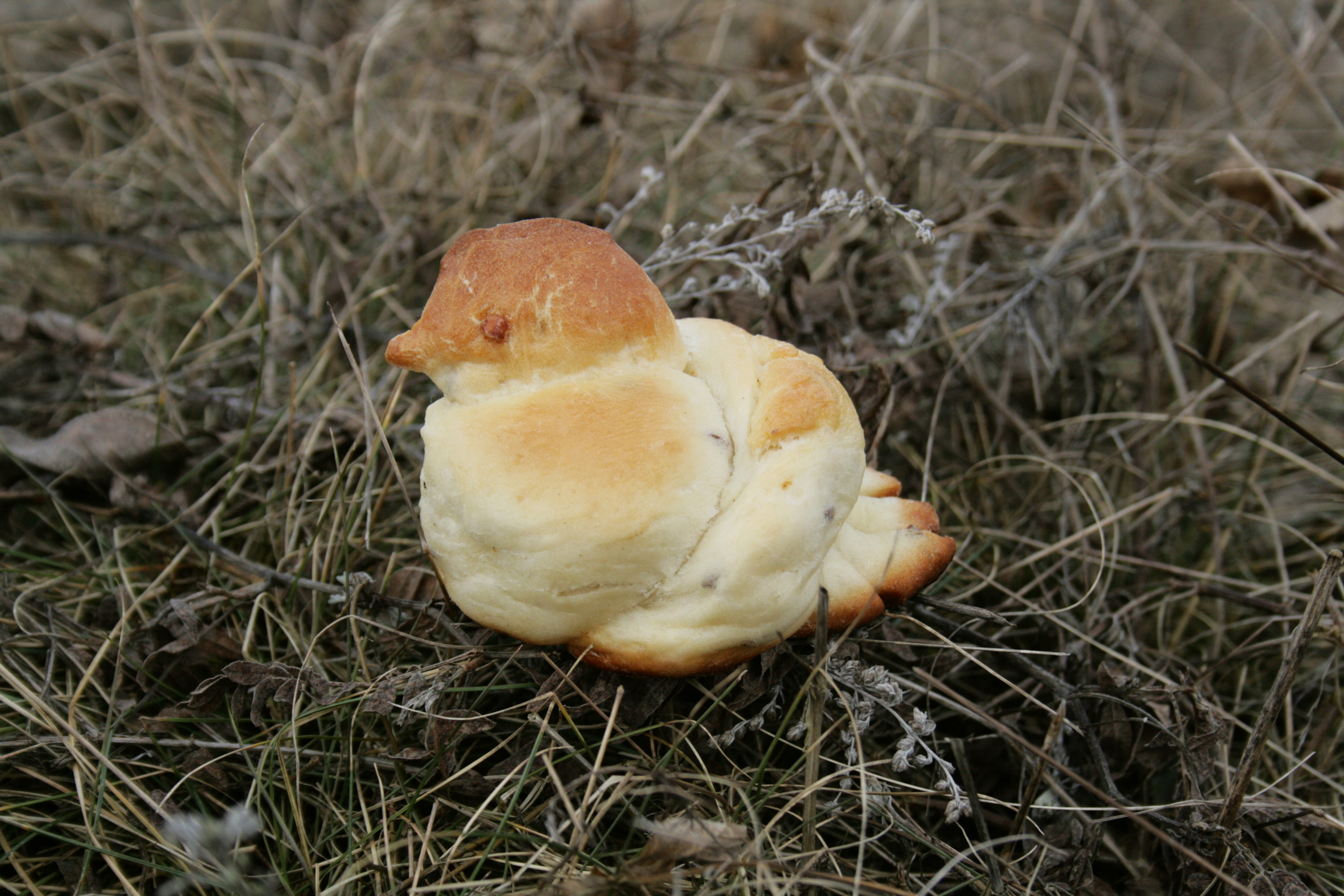
Bird baked from bread on the March equinox to celebrate spring and the forty martyrs

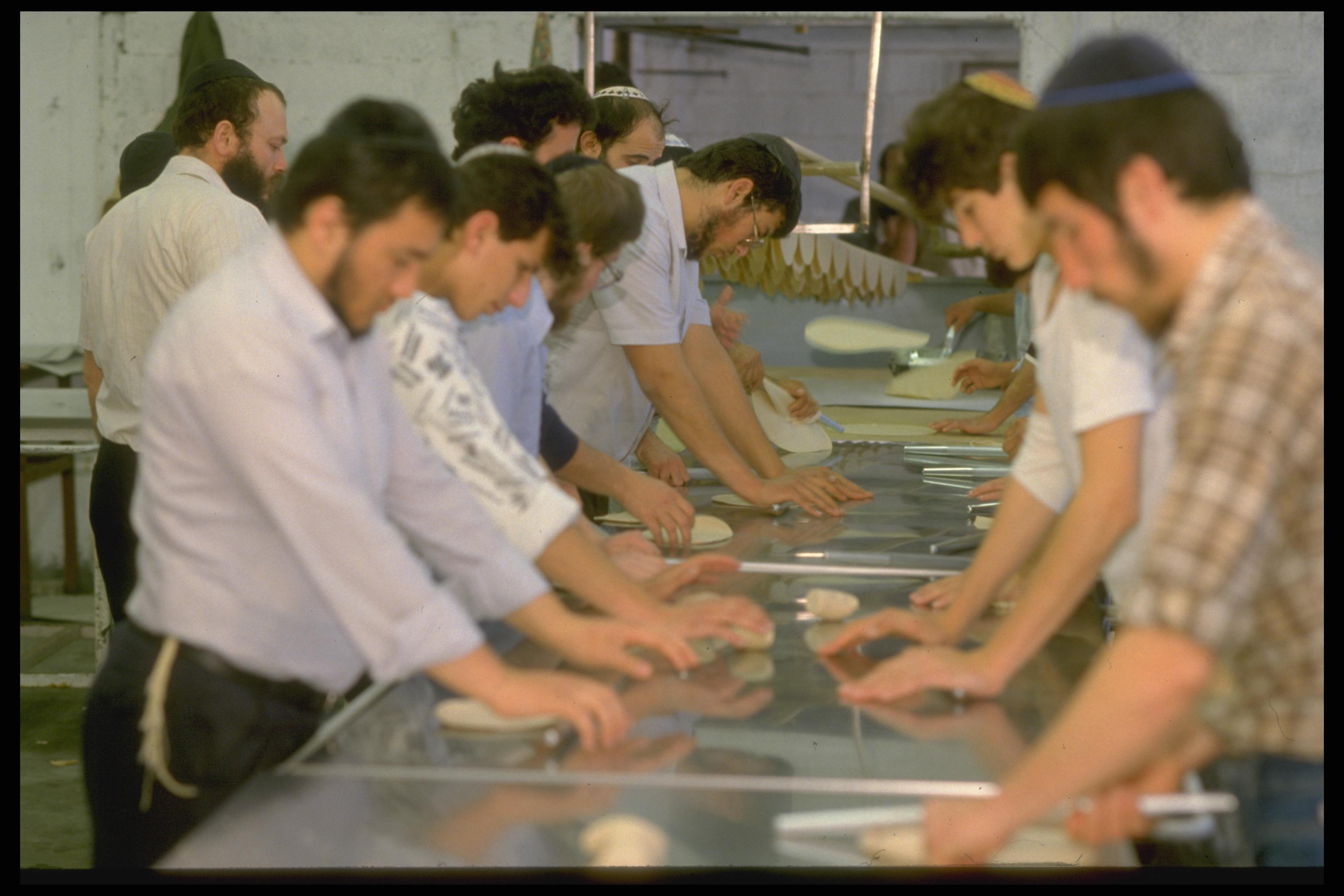
Baking matzot at Kfar Chabad

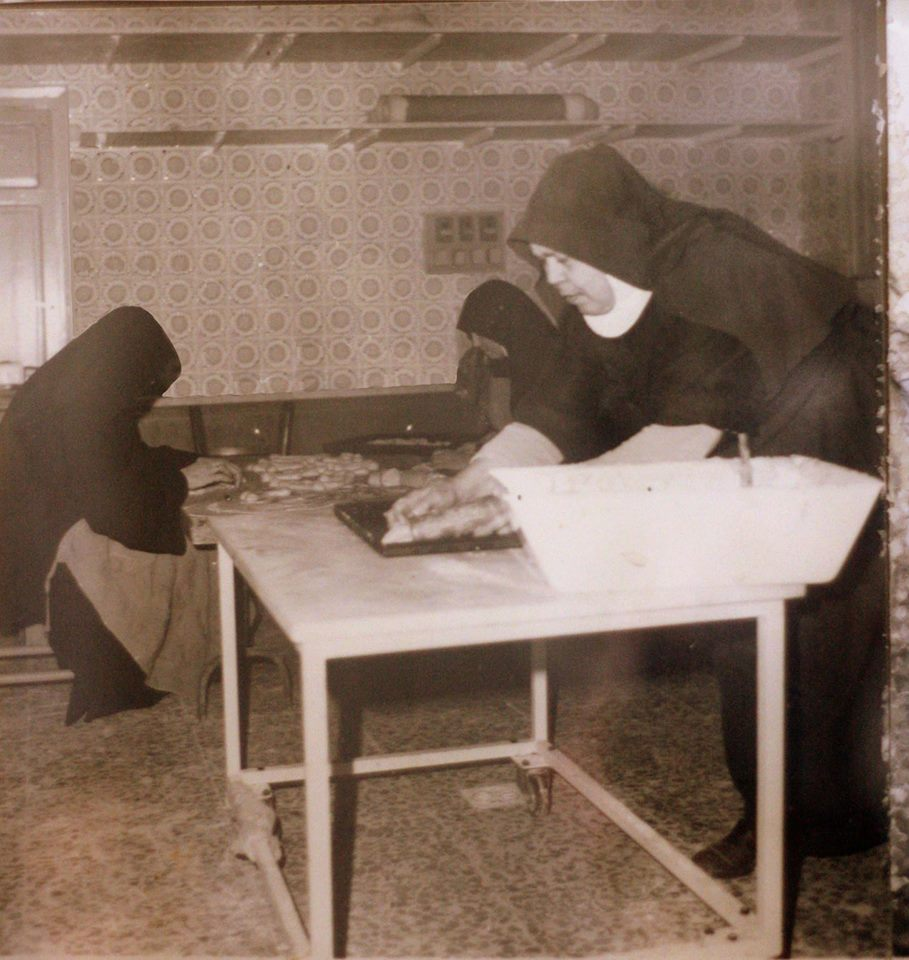
Benedictine Sisters of Caltanissetta producing the crocetta of Caltanissetta

Baking, especially of bread, holds special significance for many cultures. Baked goods are normally served at all kinds of parties and special attention is given to their quality at formal events. They are also one of the main components of a tea party, including at nursery teas and high teas, a tradition which started in Victorian Britain, reportedly when Anna Russell, Duchess of Bedford "grew tired of the sinking feeling which afflicted her every afternoon round 4 o'clock ... In 1840, she plucked up courage and asked for a tray of tea, bread and butter, and cake to be brought to her room. Once she had formed the habit she found she could not break it, so spread it among her friends instead. As the century progressed, afternoon tea became increasingly elaborate."

The Benedictine Sisters of the Benedictine Monastery of Caltanissetta baked a pastry called Crocetta of Caltanissetta (Cross of Caltanissetta). They used to be prepared for the Holy Crucifix festivity. The monastery was situated next to the Church of the Holy Cross, from which these sweet pastries take the name.

For Jews, matzo is a baked product of considerable religious and ritual significance. Baked matzah bread can be ground up and used in other dishes, such as gefilte fish, and baked again. For Christians, bread has to be baked to be used as an essential component of the sacrament of the Eucharist. In the Eastern Christian tradition, baked bread in the form of birds is given to children to carry to the fields in a spring ceremony that celebrates the Forty Martyrs of Sebaste.

Jesus defines himself as the “bread of life” (John 6:35). Divine “Grace” is called “bread of the strong” and preaching, religious teaching, the “bread of the word of God”. In Roman Catholicism, the piece of blessed wax encased in a reliquary is the “sacred bread”. In Hebrew, Bethlehem means "the house of bread", and Christians see in the fact that Jesus was born (before moving to Nazareth) in a city of that name, the significance of his sacrifice via the Eucharist. The Eucharist is often interpreted as a connection to the Holy Spirit, a symbol of God's love, and an invitation to reflect that love in service to others, providing strength for living out one's faith.

== See also ==
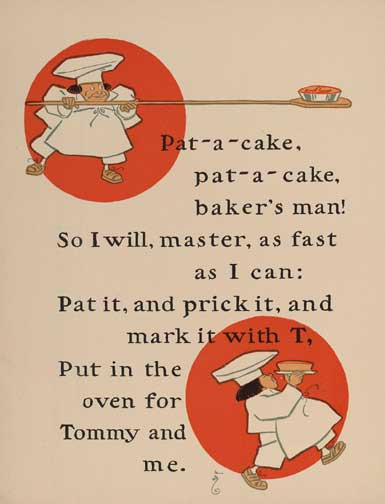

- Oven
- Baking pan
- Baking chocolate
- Baking mix
- List of baked goods
- List of bakers
- List of ovens
- Pandemic baking
- Sheet pan
- Bread

== Bibliography ==
- Burnett, John. "The baking industry in the nineteenth century." Business History 5.2 (1963): 98-108. in Britain.
- Figoni, Paula (2010). How Baking Works: Exploring the Fundamentals of Baking Science (3 ed.). Wiley. ISBN 978-0470392676.—a textbook on baking and setting up a bakery
- Laudan, Rachel. Cuisine and empire: Cooking in world history (Univ of California Press, 2013) online.
- Pasqualone, Antonella. "Traditional flat breads spread from the Fertile Crescent: Production process and history of baking systems." Journal of Ethnic Foods 5.1 (2018): 10-19. online
- Pyler, E.J.; Gorton, L.A. (2008). Baking Science & Technology (PDF). Sosland Publishing Company. ISBN 978-0-9820239-0-7. Archived from the original (PDF) on 2018-02-19.
- Sharpless, Rebecca. Grain and Fire: A History of Baking in the American South (University of North Carolina Press, 2022) online scholarly review
- Ysewijn, R. (2020). Oats in the North, Wheat from the South: The History of British Baking: Savoury and Sweet. Australia: Murdoch Books Pty Limited.
- Zanoni, Bruno, C. Peri, and Sauro Pierucci. "A study of the bread-baking process. I: A phenomenological model." Journal of food engineering 19.4 (1993): 389-398.
