= List of ancient Roman collegia =

This list of ancient Roman collegia (Latin singular collegium, meaning "joined together"; English for "college") denotes a subset of professional, religious, and burial associations that existed during the Roman Republic and Roman Empire. The other major legal form of Roman associations were political clubs, known as sodalitates. The collegia played a critical sociological role in organizing Roman society, particularly among slaves and the other lower classes. Concurrently, much of the history of collegia were left unrecorded by Roman historians, as the aristocratic authors of the time were predominantly uninterested in chronicling the labor union activities, cult worshiping rituals, and general social practices of the working classes. Exceptions to this rule existed, such as the notable and prestigious Collegium Pistorum, the college of bakers, which received wealth, political status in the Roman Senate, and some historical attention in ancient Rome. The most powerful of these professional collegia often had considerable political influence, including over legislation and magistrate appointments. This professional class of collegia were modeled in the same manner as a public corporation. However, under Roman law, collegia never were granted the same legal rights of personhood as modern corporations.

The main demarcation in the study of ancient Roman collegia concerns their legal statuses with the Roman authorities. A collegium was either classified as being collegium legitimum or collegium illicitum, respective as to whether the collegium was lawful or unlawful. This classification went through several paradigms throughout the course of Roman history, with various Senates and Emperors being either strict or lax with the legal requirements of a collegium. In many of these stricter periods, enforcement of collegial law remained lax and the majority of collegia in operation were done so unlawfully. The most famous of these unlawful collegia was Christianity. Furthermore, local governors and other magistrates often had liberal discretion over banning or sanctioning collegia within their jurisdictions. For these reasons, the same collegium would occasionally be disbanded and reconstituted, depending on the policies of the Roman authorities. For example, the Collegium Bacchus was the first recorded collegium to be outlawed. In 186 BC, the worship of Bacchus was banned by Senate decree. Subsequently, restored, the Collegium Bacchus was banned, for a brief period, a second time by the Roman Republic, in 64 BC.

Magistrate attitudes towards collegia were notably distinct between the central government in Italia and the Eastern Roman Empire. In 21 BC, under the reign of Emperor Augustus, the Roman Senate passed the Iulia lex collegiis. The effect of Iulia lex collegiis granted collegia with a certain legal capacity, including property rights and legal standing in judicial proceedings as both a defendant and plaintiff. Throughout the imperial era, the collegia also acquired the ability to receive inheritances.

== Collegia ==
Keys

- Years in light purple(†) are collegia legitima, legitimate collegia founded with Roman Senate approval.
- Years in light red(*) are collegia illicita, illegitimate collegia founded without Roman Senate approval.

Name	Year	Location	Comments
Collegium Armariorum; College of Gladiators			
Collegium Bacchus; College of Bacchus Worship			Outlawed by the Senate in 186 BC. Outlawed again by the Senate in 64 BC.
Collegium Bisellariorum; College of Makers of Chairs for the Gods			
Collegium Castrensialiorum; College of Sutlers			
Collegium Centonariorum; College of Junk Men			
Collegium Communionis Minirum; College of Actors			
Collegium Dianae et Antinoi; College of Diana and Antinous	January 1, 133 AD *	Lanuvium	The collegium was a prominent burial association that received Senate approval during the consulship of Marcus Antonius Hiberus and Publius Mummius Sisenna. The legal articles of incorporation of the collegium have been preserved on a two column marble monument discovered in 1816 (CIL 14.2112). Membership into the collegium required an initial fee of 100 sestreces, an amphora of good wine, and a monthly fee of 1.25 sestreces.
Collegium Fabri Tignuarii; College of Woodworkers at Ostia	Around AD 53		
Collegium Farnariorum; College of Mowers			
Collegium Lupanariorum; College of Brothel Keepers			
Collegium Pistorum; College of Bakers	168 BC *	Rome	The Collegium was granted its own seat in the Senate due to its critical role in the City's grain supplies.
Collegium Pontificum; College of Pontiffs	510 BC	Rome	
Collegium Saliarium Baxiarum; College of Shoe Makers			Also known as the Collegium Sutorum.
Collegium Urinatorum; College of the Underwater Divers			
Collegium Vasculariorum; College of Metal Vessel Makers			
Collegium Vinariorum; College of Wine Dealers			
Collegium Vinatorum; College of Planters			

== See also ==
- Associations in Ancient Rome
- Collegium (ancient Rome)
- Digest (Roman law)
- Lex Julia
- Twelve Tables

== Bibliography and further reading ==
- Arnaoutoglou, Ilias N. (2002). "Roman Law and collegia in Asia Minor" (PDF). Revue internationale de droit de l'Antiquité. 49: 27–44. Archived from the original (PDF) on 24 March 2017.
- Bendlin, Andreas (2011). "Associations, funerals, sociality, and Roman law: the collegium of Diana and Antinous in Lanuvium (CIL 14.2112) reconsidered". Aposteldekret und Antikes Vereinswesen: Gemeinschaft und Ihre Ordnung: 207–296.
- Lord Roger of Earlsferry (2013). Burrows, Andrew; Johnston, David; Zimmerman, Reinhard (eds.). Judge and Jurist: Essays in Memory of Lord Rodger of Earlsferry. Oxford: Oxford University Press. ISBN 9780191668517.
- Guesde, Jules (1898). Bliss, William Dwight Porter (ed.). The encyclopedia of social reform: including political economy, political science, sociology and statistics. New York: Funk & Wagnalls Company.
- Harlan, J.R. (1981). Evans, L.T.; Peacock, W.J. (eds.). Wheat Science - Today and Tomorrow. Cambridge: Cambridge University Press. pp. 1–14. ISBN 9780521237932.
- Mackey, Albert Gallatin; Singleton, William R.; Hughan, William James (1906). The History of Freemasonry (PDF). Vol. Two. New York and London: The Masonic History Company.
- Rosell, Cristina M.; Bajerska, Joanna; El Sheikha, Aly F., eds. (2015). Bread and Its Fortification: Nutrition and Health Benefits. Boca Raton, Florida: CRC Press. ISBN 9781498701563.
