= College of Aesculapius and Hygia =

The College of Aesculapius and Hygia was an association (collegium) founded in the mid-2nd century AD by a wealthy Roman woman named Salvia Marcellina, in honor of her dead husband and the procurator for whom he had worked. It is known from a lengthy inscription, dated March 11, 153 AD, that preserves the statute (lex) under which the college was constituted. The college was located on the Appian Way on the outskirts of Rome, between the first and second milestones near the oldest Temple of Mars at Rome. In addition to its commemorative purpose, the college served as a burial society and dining club for its members.

== Purpose ==
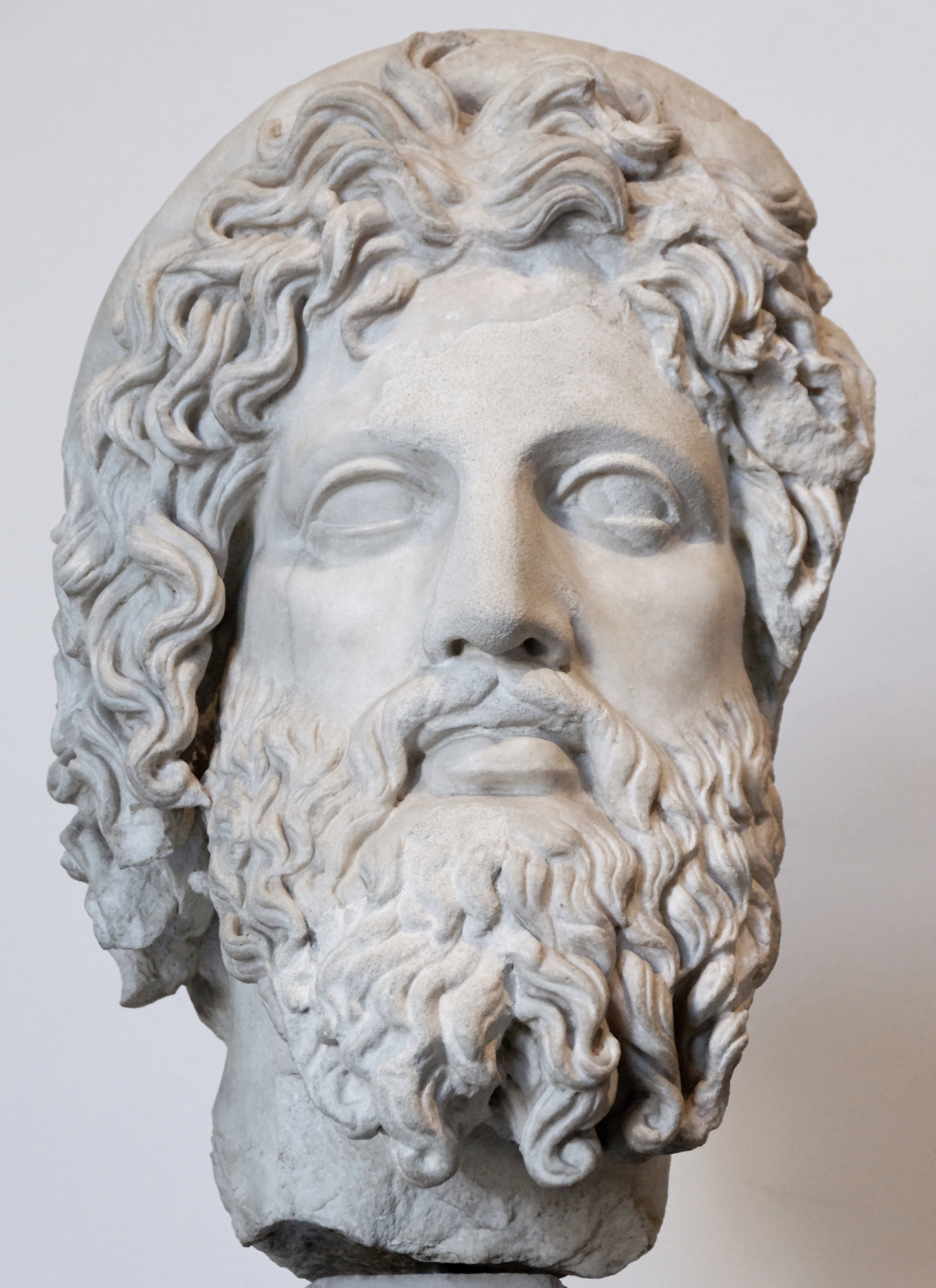
Head of Aesculapius from the Palatine Hill (latter 2nd century AD)

The college was founded by Salvia Marcellina, the mater (female chief patron) of the college, to preserve the memory of her husband, Marcus Ulpius Capito, and the procurator Flavius Apollonius, for whom he had worked. Capito is commemorated in the inscription as maritus optimus piissimus, "best and most devoted husband". Apollonius had overseen the art galleries (pinacothecae) at the imperial palace.

According to the inscription, the building in which the college was housed took the form of a shrine (aedicula) and pergola, with an attached covered solarium. It had a marble statue of Aesculapius, a god of healing. The cult of Aesculapius and Hygia had come to Rome in 293 BC. Although Hygia had been officially recognized as the counterpart of Roman Salus ("Health, Wellbeing, Salvation, Security") in 180 BC, she was rarely cultivated apart from Aesculapius, and her devotees at Rome were typically Greek.

The collegium also had an obligation to take part in Imperial cult by observing the birthday of the reigning emperor, Antoninus Pius. The name of Flavius Apollonius, the procurator who was the joint honoree of the college, indicates that he was a freedman of a Flavian emperor, most likely Domitian. Commemoration of the emperor's birthday was the only observance required of the college that specifies a site other than its headquarters: in templo Divorum in aede divi Titi, "in the shrine (aedes) of the divinized Titus within the precinct (templum) of the Divine [Emperors] (Divi)". This cultic link between Aesculapius–Hygia and the Temple of Vespasian and Titus is one of several indications that the divinized Flavii were also regarded as healers.

== Funding ==
The college was established by an endowment of 50,000 sesterces (HS) from Salvia Marcellina, who also provided the building for its meetings. An additional grant of 10,000 HS for memorial dinners was made by Publius Aelius Zeno, the brother of Salvia's deceased husband and a pater (male patron) of the college. The charter stipulated that the college would operate as a lender, and fund its expenses through interest charges on amounts borrowed from its capital endowment.

== Membership ==
The college was limited to sixty members, and admitted new members only to replace those who had died. The membership fee was half the funeraticium, a publicly funded burial allowance of 250 HS instituted under the emperor Nerva (reigned 96–98 AD) for the Roman plebs. A member could bequeath his place to his son or brother, or to one of his freedmen (liberti).

At the time of its founding, the president of the college (quinquennalis) was Gaius Ofilius Hermes. Some members were immunes, exempt from fees. Others were curatores, "caretakers". The body of regular members was the populus, "the people".

== Meetings and benefits ==
Like other collegia, the College of Aesculapius and Hygia would have a monthly business meeting (conventus) at which a dinner was served.

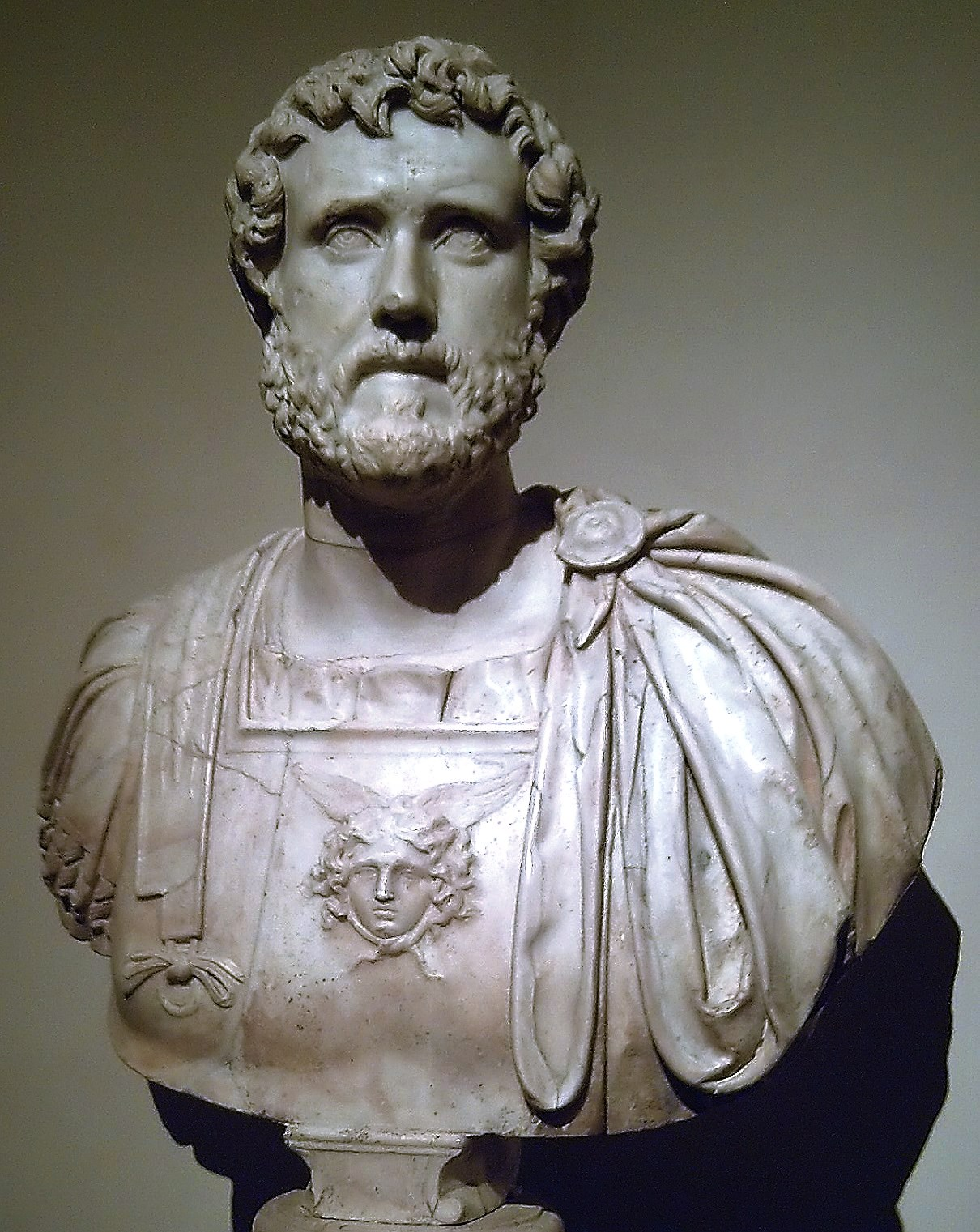
The college celebrated the birthday of Antoninus Pius on September 19

Two types of distributions for members were funded: sportulae, "handouts" in the form of cash gifts; and four occasions when sportulae were accompanied by bread and wine for a meal: the "love feast" on February 22 when Roman families commemorated their beloved dead; a "Violet Day" on March 22; a "Rose Day" on May 11; and the founding of the college on November 8. The full cycle of events was:

- January 8, strenae, gifts given at the end of the New Year celebrations
- February 22, Cara Cognatio
- March 14, a dinner (cena) presented by the quinquennalis
- March 22, Dies Violaris
- May 11, Dies Rosalis
- September 19, sportulae commemorating the birthday (dies natalis) of Antoninus Pius
- November 8, the natalis collegi.

The Dies Violaris and Rosalis are flower festivals during the blooming season of violets and roses when tombs were adorned with garlands.

Sportulae were distributed on a benefits scale based on the member's place in the college hierarchy, and the amounts also varied by occasion. For the emperor's birthday, the patrons (mater and pater) and the quinquennalis each received 12 HS, the immunes and curatores 8 HS, and the regular members 4 HS.

== Significance ==
The lex or statute by which the college was constituted was approved on March 11, 153 AD. The inscription that preserves it (Lex Collegi Aesculapi et Hygiae) is one of the most important pieces of evidence in understanding the various collegia organized among Rome's lower classes, most of which were focused on a trade or a deity. Voluntary associations and confraternities were an important part of social life in the Roman Empire, particularly for those whose personal resources were limited. In addition to burial societies and drinking and dining clubs, inscriptions and other documents attest to the regulated existence of numerous professional and trade guilds, performing arts troupes, veterans' groups, and religious sodalities (sodalitates).

== See also ==
- Roman funerals and burial
