= Cloche (tableware) =

Tableware cover

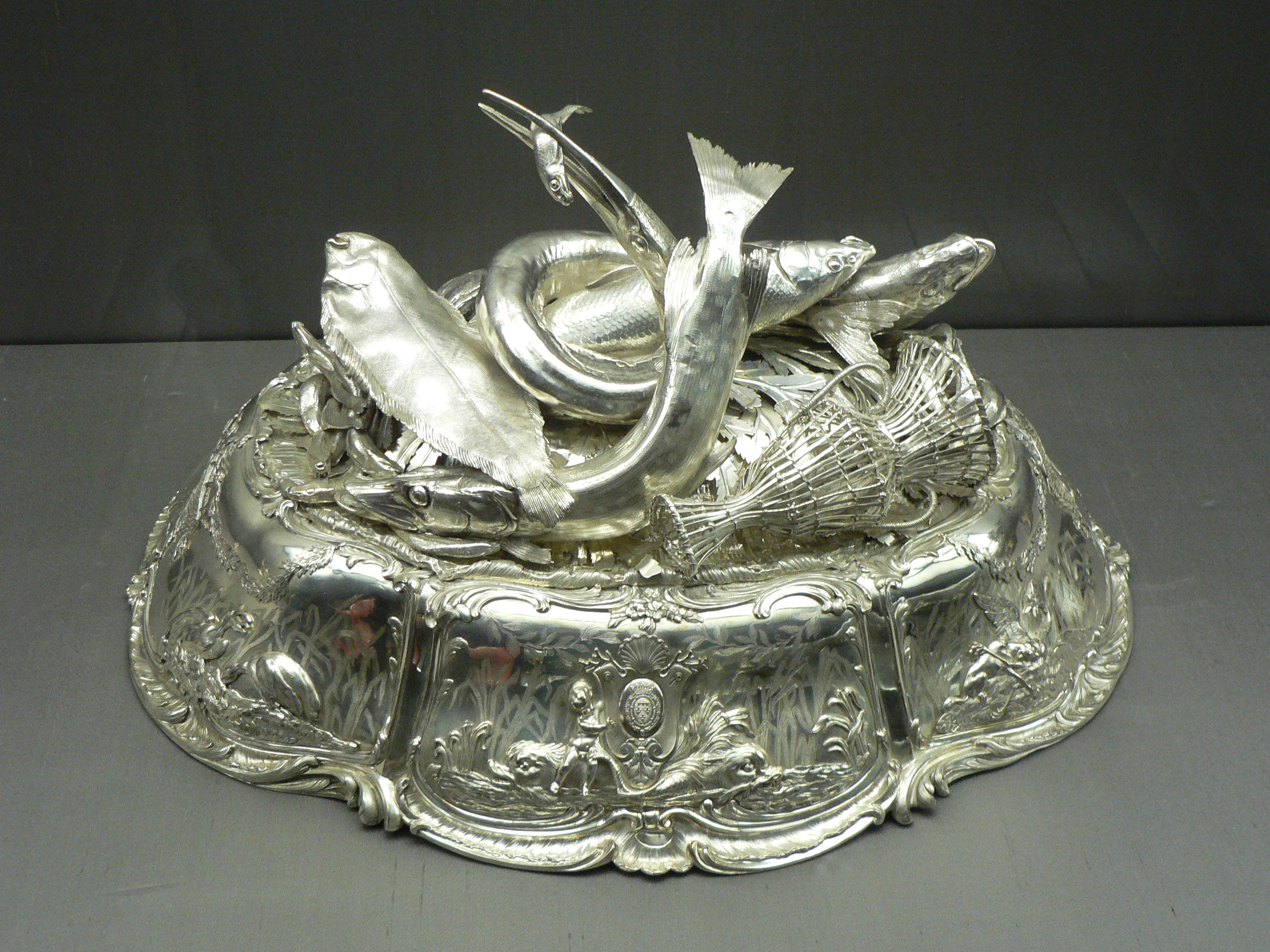
An eighteenth century cloche

A cloche (from the French for "bell") is a tableware cover, sometimes made out of silver though commercially available as glass, stoneware, marble, or other materials. They often resemble a bell, hence the name.

== See also ==
- Tableware
- Masonry oven
- Bell jar
- Desiccator
