= Associations in ancient Rome =

In ancient Rome, the principle of private association was recognized very early by the state. Sodalitates for religious purposes are mentioned in the Twelve Tables, and collegia opificum, or trade guilds, were believed to have been instituted by Numa Pompilius, which probably means that they were regulated by the jus divinum as being associated with particular cults.

It can be difficult to distinguish between the two words collegium and sodalitas. Collegium is the wider of the two in meaning, and may be used for associations of all kinds, public and private, while sodalitas is more especially a union for the purpose of maintaining a cult. Both words indicate the permanence of the object undertaken by the association, while a societas is a temporary combination without strictly permanent duties.

== Trade associations ==
The collegia opificum ascribed to Numa include guilds of weavers, fullers, dyers, shoemakers, doctors, teachers, painters, and other occupations, as listed by Ovid in the Fasti. Ovid says they were in origin associated with the cult of Minerva, the goddess of handiwork. Plutarch mentions flute-players, who were connected with the cult of Jupiter on the Capitol, as well as guilds of smiths, goldsmiths, tanners.

Though these guilds may not have had a religious purpose, like all early institutions they were associated with some religious cult, and in most cases the cult of Minerva. Almost all these collegia had their religious centre and business headquarters at her temple on the Aventine Hill. When a guild of poets was instituted during the Second Punic War, this too had its meeting-place in the same temple.

The purpose of the guild in each case was no doubt to protect and advance the interests of the trade, but little information for them exists until the age of Cicero, when they reappear in the form of political clubs (collegia sodalicia or compitalicia) chiefly with the object of securing the election of candidates for magistracies. The political collegia were suppressed by a senatus consultum in 64 BC, revived by Clodius six years later, and finally abolished by Julius Caesar, as dangerous to public order.

The principle of the trade guild reasserts itself under the Empire, and is found at work in Rome and in every municipal town. Though the right of permitting such associations belonged to the government, these trade guilds were recognized by the state as being instituted "ut necessariam operam publicis utilitatibus exhiberent" ("so that they might perform the necessary work of public 'utilities'," or useful public works).

Every kind of trade and business throughout the Empire seems to have had its collegium, as is shown by the inscriptions collected in the Corpus Inscriptionum Latinarum from any Roman municipal town. These inscriptions provide important evidence for the life and work of the lower orders of the municipales. The primary object was no doubt still to protect the trade, but as time went on they tended to become associations for feasting and enjoyment, and more and more to depend on the munificence of patrons elected with the object of eliciting it. How far they formed a basis or example for the guilds of the early Middle Ages is a difficult question. Eventually, the trade associations supported the individual to have society and enjoyment in life, and the certainty of funeral rites and a permanent memorial after death.

== Religious associations ==
Associations formed for the maintenance of religious cults were usually called sodalitates, though the word collegium was also used for them, as in the case of the college of the Arval Brethren. Of the ancient Sodales Titii nothing is known until they were revived by Augustus; it may have been that when a gens or family charged with the maintenance of a particular cult had died out, its place was supplied by a sodalitas.

The introduction of new cults also led to the institution of new associations. In 495 BC when the worship of Minerva was introduced, a collegium mercatorum was founded to maintain it, which held its feast on the dies natalis (dedication day) of the temple. In 387 the ludi Capitolini were placed under the care of a similar association of dwellers on the Capitoline Hill. In 204 BC when the Magna Mater (Great Mother, or Cybele) was introduced from Pessinus, a sodalitas was instituted which, as Cicero notes, used to feast together during the ludi Megalenses.

All such associations were duly licensed by the state, which at all times was vigilant in forbidding the maintenance of any which it deemed dangerous for religious or political reasons. In 186 BC the senate, by a decree of which part is preserved, made all combination for promoting the Bacchic religious rites strictly illegal. Legal sodalitates are frequent later; the temple of Venus Genetrix, begun by Julius Caesar and finished by Augustus, had its collegium. Sodalilates were instituted for the cult of the deified emperors such as Augustus (see Sodales Augustales) and Claudius.

== Burial associations ==
Securing a proper burial was one motive for a working class person to belong to a trade guild. In the year 133 under Hadrian, the formation of collegia specifically for this purpose was recognized by law, preserved at the head of the regulations of a collegium instituted for the worship of Diana and Antinous at Lanuvium. According to the Digest (47. 22), this was a general law allowing the founding of funerary associations, as long as the law against illicit collegia was complied with. The inscription of Lanuvium, together with many others, indicates that heir members were as a rule of the humblest classes of society, and often included slaves. Each member paid an entrance fee and a monthly subscription, and a funeral grant was made to his heir upon death in order to bury him in the burying-place of the college, or if they were too poor to construct one of their own, to secure burial in a public columbarium.

These colleges were organized along the same lines as the municipal towns of the empire. Their officers were elected, usually for a year, or in the case of honorary distinctions, for life. As in a municipal town, they held titles such as quinquennales, curatores, and praefecti. Quaestors superintended the finances of the association. Their place of meeting, if they were rich enough to have one, was called schola and was like a clubhouse. The site or the building was often given them by some rich patron, who was pleased to see his name engraved over its doorway.

The patroni increased in number, and more and more the colleges acquired the habit of depending on their benefactions. The inscriptions provide no evidence of whether the collegia also provided assistance to sick or infirm members. The only exceptions seem to be the military collegia, which, though strictly forbidden as dangerous to discipline, continued to increase in number in spite of the law. Inscriptions from the great legionary camps of the Roman province of Africa show not only the existence of these clubs, but the way in which their funds were spent. It appears that they were applied to useful purposes in the life of a member as well as for his burial, e.g. to traveling expenses, or to his support after his discharge.

== Decline ==
As the Roman Empire became gradually impoverished and depopulated, and as the difficulty of defending its frontiers increased, these associations must have been slowly extinguished. The sudden invasion of Dacia by barbarians in AD 166 was followed by the extinction of one collegium which has left a record of the fact, and probably by many others. The master of the college of Jupiter Cernenius, with the two quaestors and seven witnesses, attest the fact that the college has ceased to exist: "The accounts have been wound up, and no balance is left in the chest. For a long time no member has attended on the days fixed for meetings, and no subscriptions have been paid.

== Sources ==
In addition to the works cited below, see Mommsen, De Collegiis et Sodaliciis (1843), which laid the foundation for all subsequent study of the subject; Marquardt, Staatsverwaltung, iii. 134 foIl.; de Marchi, Il culto privato di Roma antica, ii. 75 foll.; Kornemann, s. v. "Collegium" in Pauly-Wissowa, Realencyclopädie.
