= Masonry oven =

Baking chamber made of brick, concrete, or stone

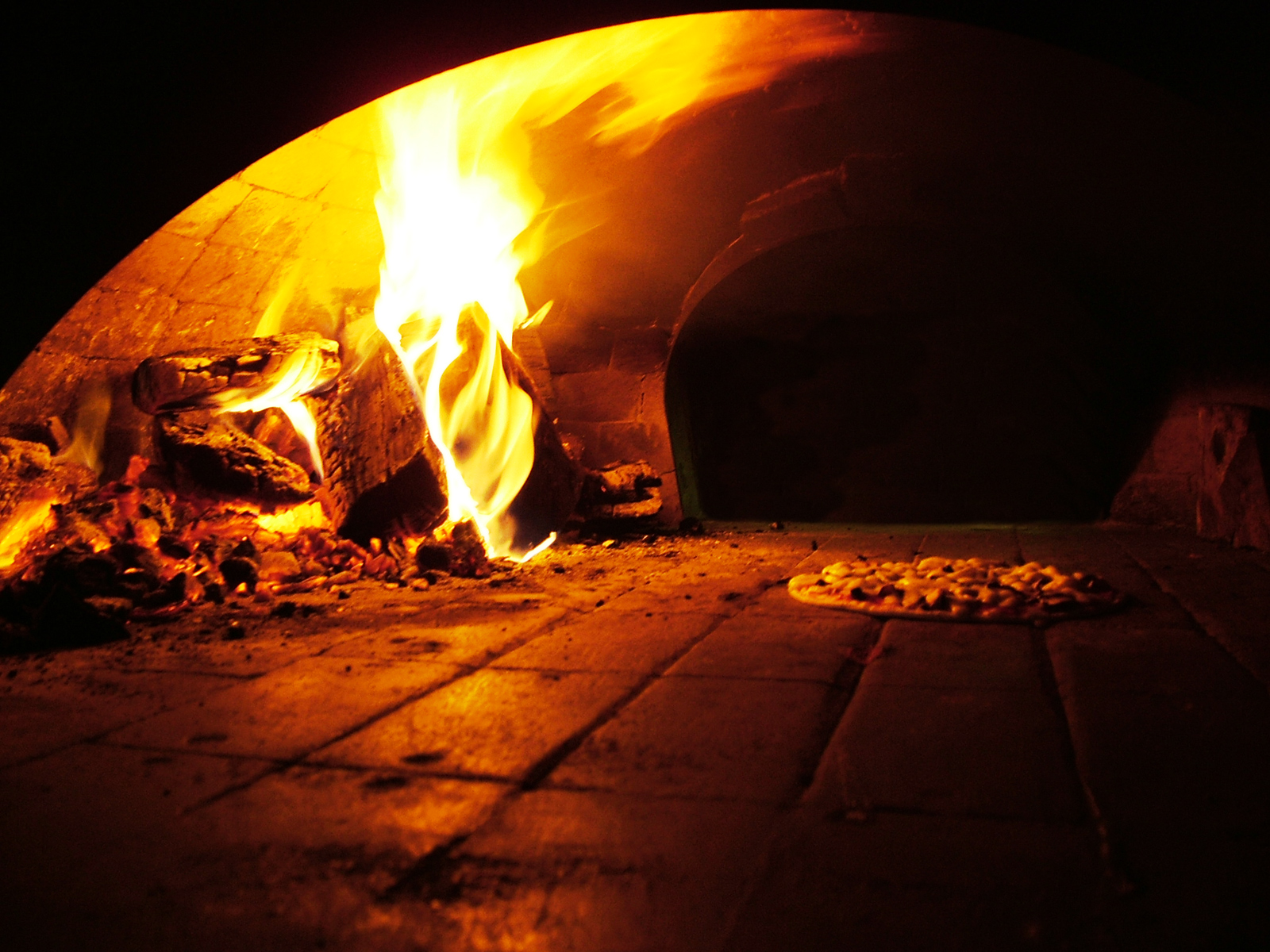
A wood-burning brick oven

A masonry oven, colloquially known as a brick oven or stone oven, is an oven consisting of a baking chamber made of fireproof brick, concrete, stone, clay (clay oven), or cob (cob oven). Though traditionally wood-fired, coal-fired ovens were common in the 19th century, and modern masonry ovens are often fired with natural gas or even electricity. Modern masonry ovens are closely associated with artisan bread and pizza, but in the past they were used for any cooking task involving baking.

== Origins and history ==
=== Prehistory ===
Humans constructed masonry ovens long before the advent of writing. The development of cooking technologies began when early humans started using fire to prepare food, initially through methods such as spit-roasting over open flames or embers. Starchy roots and other foods that required longer cooking times were often buried in hot ashes and sometimes covered with heated stones or more ash. For larger quantities, cooking was carried out in earth ovens, pits heated with fire and lined with hot rocks.

These techniques are still in use today and are well-represented in the archaeological record. However, true masonry ovens, constructed from materials like clay, brick, or stone, only began to appear with the advent of grain agriculture and the baking of bread. Beer, likely an early source of wild yeast, may have played a role in the development of leavened bread. Ancient Egyptian depictions show bakers placing dough on hot stones and covering it with heated clay pots, an early form of enclosed baking. Over time, these single-loaf devices evolved into larger ovens capable of baking multiple loaves. Construction methods progressed from pits and clay domes to more permanent brick and stone vaults.

=== Masonry ovens in Asia and in the Americas ===
In the modern Arab states of the Persian Gulf, masonry ovens are traditionally used to bake khubz, a type of flatbread. In South Asia, tandoor ovens, originally made of clay, are widely used in India and Pakistan, although contemporary versions may be electrically powered. The open-topped design of the tandoor represents a transitional form between the earth oven and enclosed masonry ovens. In the pre-Columbian Americas, similar ovens were constructed from clay or adobe and are now commonly referred to by the Spanish term horno, meaning "oven". Hornos remain traditional in the American Southwest.

=== Masonry ovens in Europe ===
==== Black ovens ====
The classic direct-fired masonry oven, often referred to as a "black oven" or "Roman oven", dates back to at least the Roman Republic. The term "black oven" derives from the soot deposited by the internal fire on the oven's dome. These ovens were frequently built for communal use. For example, in France, banal ovens were publicly owned and rented out to individuals for a fee. Such ovens became common in colonial-era America and are still used today in artisanal bakeries, pizzerias, restaurants and even in home and backyard settings.

==== White ovens ====
A later innovation, the "white oven", is fired externally so that flame and soot do not enter the baking chamber. This design is commonly integrated into masonry heater systems. A hybrid design, known in France as the gueulard, combines features of both internal and external firing systems.

== Efficiency and use ==
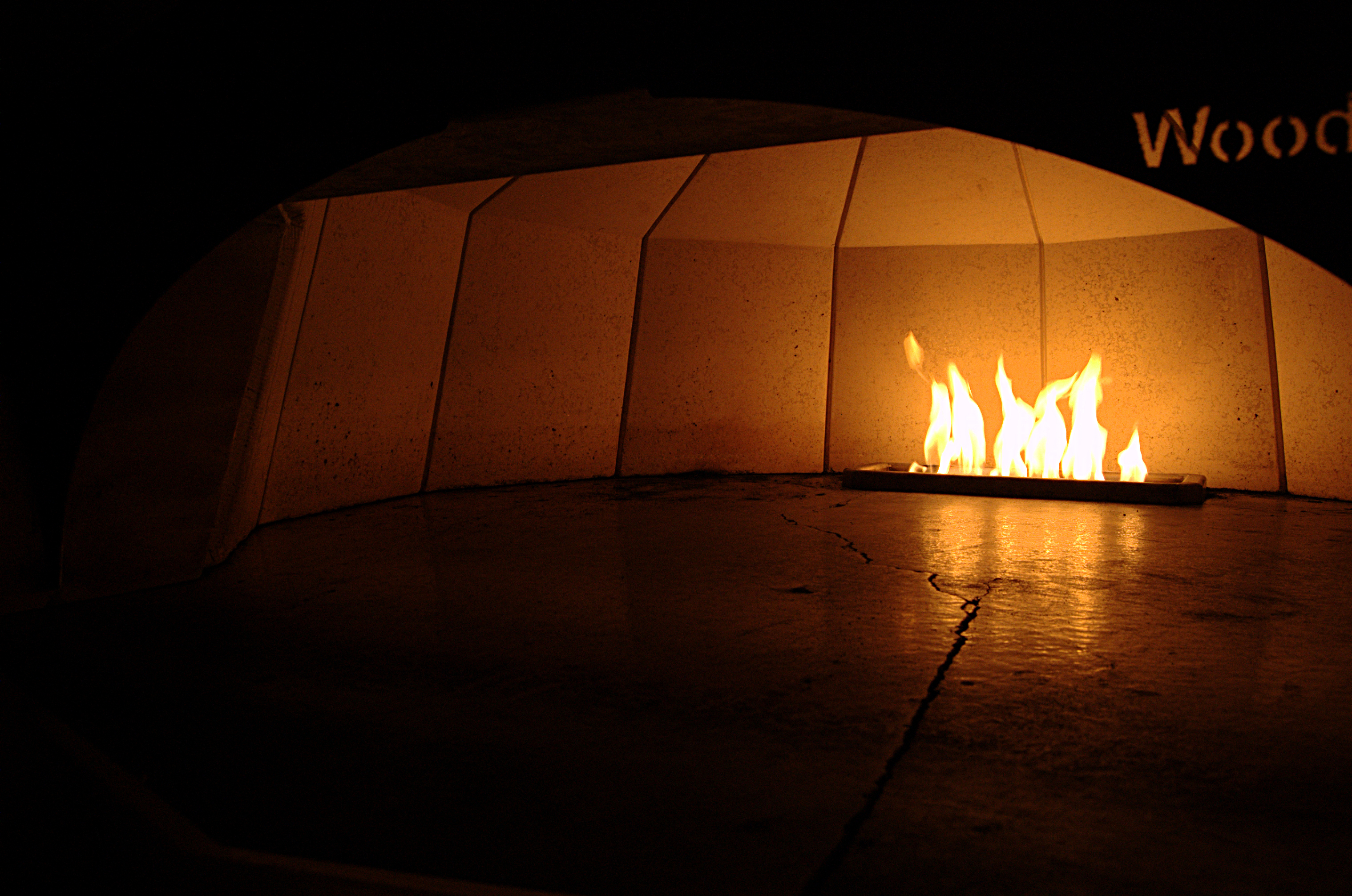
A modern gas-fired masonry oven used in a restaurant

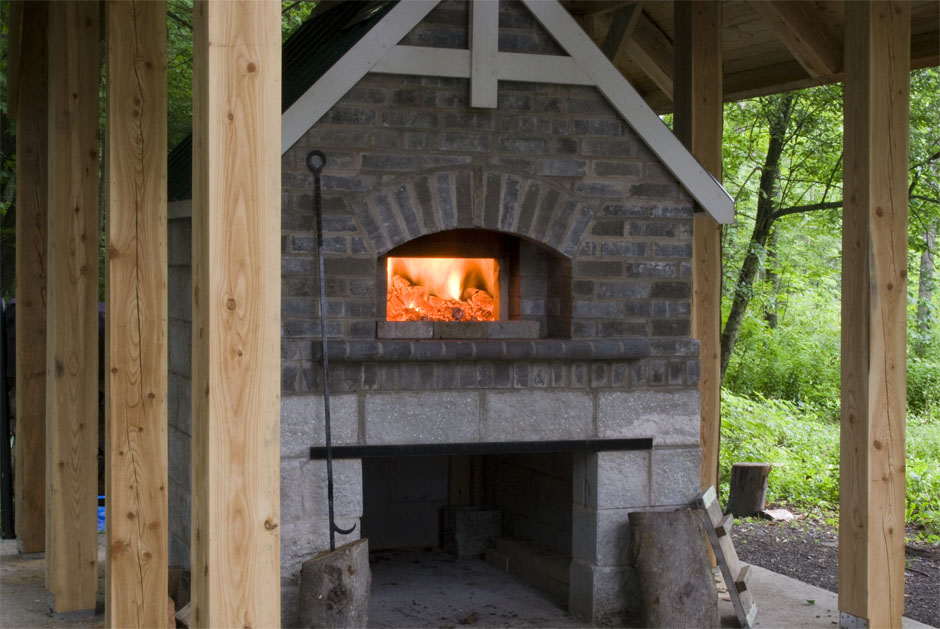
A masonry wood-fired oven, during the firing (heating) stage

Masonry ovens remain popular in part because of the way their use affects cooking processes and food flavor. Where modern gas or electric ovens cook food by moving hot air around inside an insulated, lightweight box, a masonry oven works by soaking up heat, like a battery building up a full charge. When hot, the heavy oven walls release the heat slowly, for hours. Thus the food is cooked not only by hot air but also by radiant heat from hot dense masonry and especially for bread and pizza, which are not cooked in pans, heat conducted directly into the food from hot floor bricks (bakers call the resulting added rising action of bread "oven spring".) Finally, a masonry oven seals in the steam produced by the water in cooking food. A supercharged steamy atmosphere produces a more flavorful and chewy crust (see Maillard reaction); it also keeps other foods moist and tender. The triple combination of radiant, conductive, and convected heat also speeds cooking.

Wood-burning masonry ovens are mandated for production of true Neapolitan pizza.

== Construction ==
Early ovens were constructed from clay soil, typically tempered with sand to reduce cracking—similar to the techniques used in brick-making. Builders shaped the clay over temporary forms made from sticks or sand. Once the clay stiffened sufficiently, a doorway was cut and the internal form was removed—either by digging out the sand or burning out the wooden supports. Smoke vented through the oven door, either directly outside or via a chimney positioned just above the door.

=== Brick and dome construction ===
Brick ovens may also be constructed over formwork, though many traditions developed dome-building techniques that did not require any. For example, traditional Italian dome ovens are often built free-form, sometimes entirely by eye. Construction typically begins with a circular base of bricks or half-bricks. Subsequent layers are laid on wedge-shaped mortar beds, each with an increasing inward pitch, gradually forming a dome. Suction between dry bricks and wet mortar holds them in place until the uppermost layers, at which point temporary supports may be used until the keystone locks the structure.

Rectangular ovens are easier to build with standard bricks and require minimal cutting. Specially tapered arch bricks help in creating stronger vaults, but without lateral support, such as buttressing or a steel harness, the outward thrust from the vault's weight can cause structural failure. Round ovens require more precise cutting but typically need less reinforcement.

Regardless of whether ovens are built with mud, brick, modern castable materials or modular prefabricated components, the basic structural principles remain consistent. Most ovens are installed under a roof or other weather-protective covering.

=== Modern insulation practices ===
A major development in masonry oven construction is the incorporation of insulation. Since masonry can lose heat as quickly as it absorbs it, traditional ovens relied on increased mass to retain heat longer. Thicker walls could store more thermal energy but only to a certain extent. Heat naturally moves from hot to cold, so the oven's exterior cannot reach the internal baking temperatures unless insulated with fireproof materials.

Effective insulation involves placing a compressive and heat-resistant layer beneath the oven, akin to a mattress, and a blanket-like layer on top. However, given that ovens often weigh thousands of pounds, few natural materials provide both insulation and adequate structural support. Recent technological advances have significantly expanded the options.

=== Thermodynamics of insulating masonry ovens ===
Some oven designs mitigate heat loss by elevating the oven off damp ground. In historical examples such as Canadian clay ovens, thick masonry allowed even wooden bases to remain safe from combustion and over-firing. Lightweight stones like tufa or pumice have also served as insulative plinth materials.

In the 1980s, oven builder Alan Scott—regarded as a grandfather of modern wood-fired ovens—popularized a technique using lightweight concrete slabs made with pumice, perlite, or vermiculite. By extending the rebar into the supporting walls, the oven could essentially "hang" from the slab. Removing the formwork created an insulating air gap beneath the oven, breaking the thermal bridge that would otherwise allow heat loss into the foundation.

Other insulation strategies include using high-strength insulative board under the oven floor or combining empty glass bottles with clay and organic matter (e.g., sawdust, chaff, nut shells) for a lightweight, sponge-like, insulating base.

To retain heat above the oven, builders may enclose it with walls filled with perlite, pumice or vermiculite. Alternatively, mineral wool blankets made from high-temperature resistant rock or clay can be wrapped around the oven. These require a protective outer shell, often made from reinforced stucco or tile.

A study of Canadian clay ovens by Boily and Blanchette found that the ideal ratio between the door height and the dome height is approximately 63%. A dome that is too high reduces radiant heat, while a door that is too high allows heat to escape. Conversely, a door below 63% of the dome height restricts airflow, hampering combustion.

Modern masonry ovens can differ significantly from traditional forms. Some consist only of a cast baking deck, similar to a pizza stone, enclosed in a standard oven housing. These are common in commercial kitchens, though smaller, tabletop versions also exist.

Modern masonry ovens sometimes bear little resemblance to their forebears, and can have just a cast deck (similar to a pizza stone) inside a more conventional oven exterior. Such devices are primarily used in commercial settings, though tabletop models are available. (Note: Cookery equipment manufacturer Cuisinart sells a tabletop "brick oven" that uses a pizza stone-like lining to store heat for baking.)

=== Types ===
==== Cob, clay, and earthen ovens ====
"Cob", a British term for a type of earthen building material, is closely related to adobe. The word "cob" derives from an Anglo-Saxon (Old English) term meaning "lump" and is also used in reference to round loaves of bread and compact horses. The term "adobe" comes from the Arabic al-ṭūb, meaning "the mud".

Earthen construction, using clay, sand and fibrous organic materials, is among the most widespread and ancient building methods. Due to its accessibility and low environmental impact, cob and clay construction has seen a resurgence in popularity, particularly among those seeking sustainable building techniques. Small, wood-fired ovens are common introductory projects in natural building, leading to the proliferation of cob oven designs, many of which are documented in online communities and publications.

Historically, masonry ovens dating back to ancient Egypt were often built from native clay, tempered with materials such as sand, gravel or straw to reduce cracking. Smaller ovens were frequently constructed over temporary forms made of sand or woven sticks. Once the outer shell was completed and had dried, the internal form was either dug out or burned away.

One traditional variant is the clome oven, a modular, sometimes portable, clay oven resembling an inverted pot with a door cut into the side. These were often encased in brickwork and built into the chimneys of English homes. This design allowed ashes and coals to be swept into the shared hearth and smoke to vent through the chimney. According to food historian Elizabeth David, similar ovens were still being produced in Barnstaple, Devon, as late as 1890.

==== Ceramic cloche ====
A cloche, also known as a cooking bell, is a dome-shaped ceramic cover used in traditional baking. Typically resembling an inverted bowl with a handle, it is preheated in a fire alongside a flat stone or a cleared section of the hearth. Bread dough is placed on the heated surface and covered with the cloche, which retains and radiates heat, creating an enclosed baking environment. Hot coals or ashes may be placed on top for additional heat retention.

This technique, which dates back to ancient Egypt and Greece, is considered one of the earliest forms of masonry oven baking. The cloche's enclosed design helps replicate the thermal mass and radiant heat of larger fixed masonry ovens in a compact, portable form.

== Simulation ==
It is possible to get some of the benefits of a masonry oven without constructing a full oven. The most common method is the stoneware pizza stone, which stores heat while the oven is preheating and transmits it directly to the bottom of the pizza. Common firebricks can be used in a similar manner to cover a shelf. Bread and meat can be cooked in a type of covered ceramic casserole dish known variously as a cloche, a Schlemmertopf (brand name), or the like. Good results can also be had by cooking the bread in a pre-heated Dutch oven with a well-fitting lid. Most expensive is a ceramic or stoneware oven liner that provides many of the benefits of a cloche without restricting the baker to one size of pan.

It is sometimes possible to cook bread on a grill to simulate the use of radiant heat in a masonry oven; while this is generally reserved for flatbreads and pizzas, a few recipes for loaf breads are designed to use a grill as well, with or without a masonry or ceramic heating surface.

== See also ==
- Chimenea
- Dutch oven
- Outdoor cooking
- Pizza oven
- Primitive clay oven
- Wood-fired oven
