= Collegium Pistorum =

The Collegium Pistorum was the officially recognized collegium (guild) of bakers in ancient Rome, playing a central role in the production and distribution of bread and the regulation of the Roman grain supply.

In the late Roman Republic, bread shifted from a luxury good to an everyday staple. There is disagreement about its foundation, with some historians arguing that it was founded by the Emperor Trajan while others arguing that it was established in 168 BC to regulate and control the market. Trajan did put the collegium under the Praefectus annonae. The Collegium became critical to the ancient Roman grain supply. As a consequence, the Collegium was granted its own seat in the Senate.

Unlike many Roman collegia its notability and prestige meant that it attracted historical attention.

== Sources ==
- Bakker, Jan Theo, ed. (2006). "9. Liber de Caesaribus" (PDF). Living and Working with the Gods: Studies in the Private Religion of Imperial Rome. Ostia Antica.
- Bond, Sarah (2016). Trade and Taboo: Disreputable Professions in the Roman Mediterranean. University of Michigan Press. ISBN 978-0-472-12225-7.
- Harlan, J.R. (1981). Evans, L.T.; Peacock, W.J. (eds.). Wheat Science - Today and Tomorrow. Cambridge: Cambridge University Press. pp. 1–14. ISBN 9780521237932.
- Morgan, James (2012). Culinary Creation. Routledge. ISBN 978-1-136-41270-7.
- Reden, Sitta von (2021-12-20). Handbook of Ancient Afro-Eurasian Economies: Volume 2: Local, Regional, and Imperial Economies. Walter de Gruyter GmbH & Co KG. ISBN 978-3-11-060493-1.
- Rosell, Cristina M.; Bajerska, Joanna; El Sheikha, Aly F., eds. (2015). Bread and Its Fortification: Nutrition and Health Benefits. Boca Raton, Florida: CRC Press. ISBN 9781498701563.
