= Baking stone =

Portable cooking surface used in baking

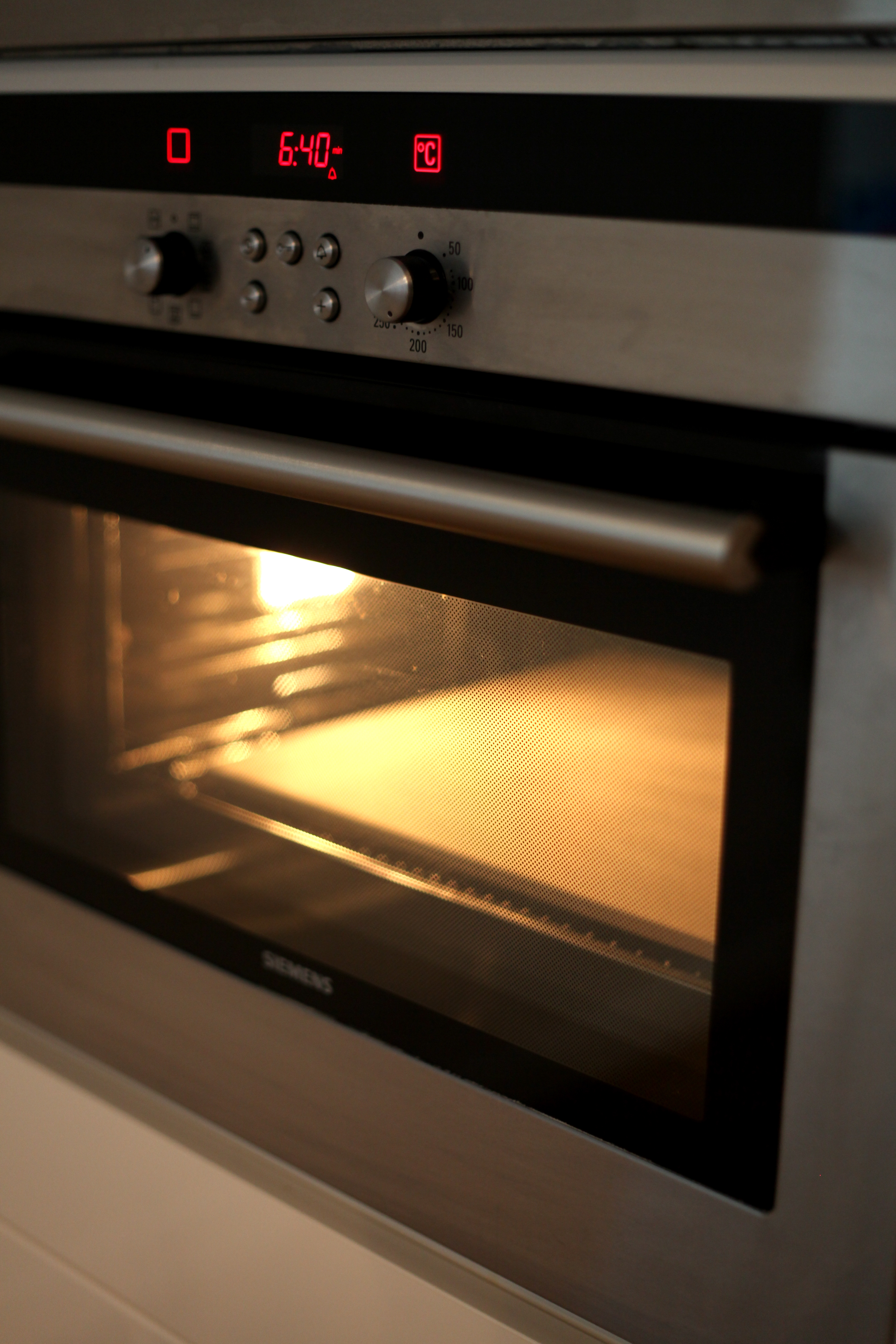
A large baking stone inside an oven

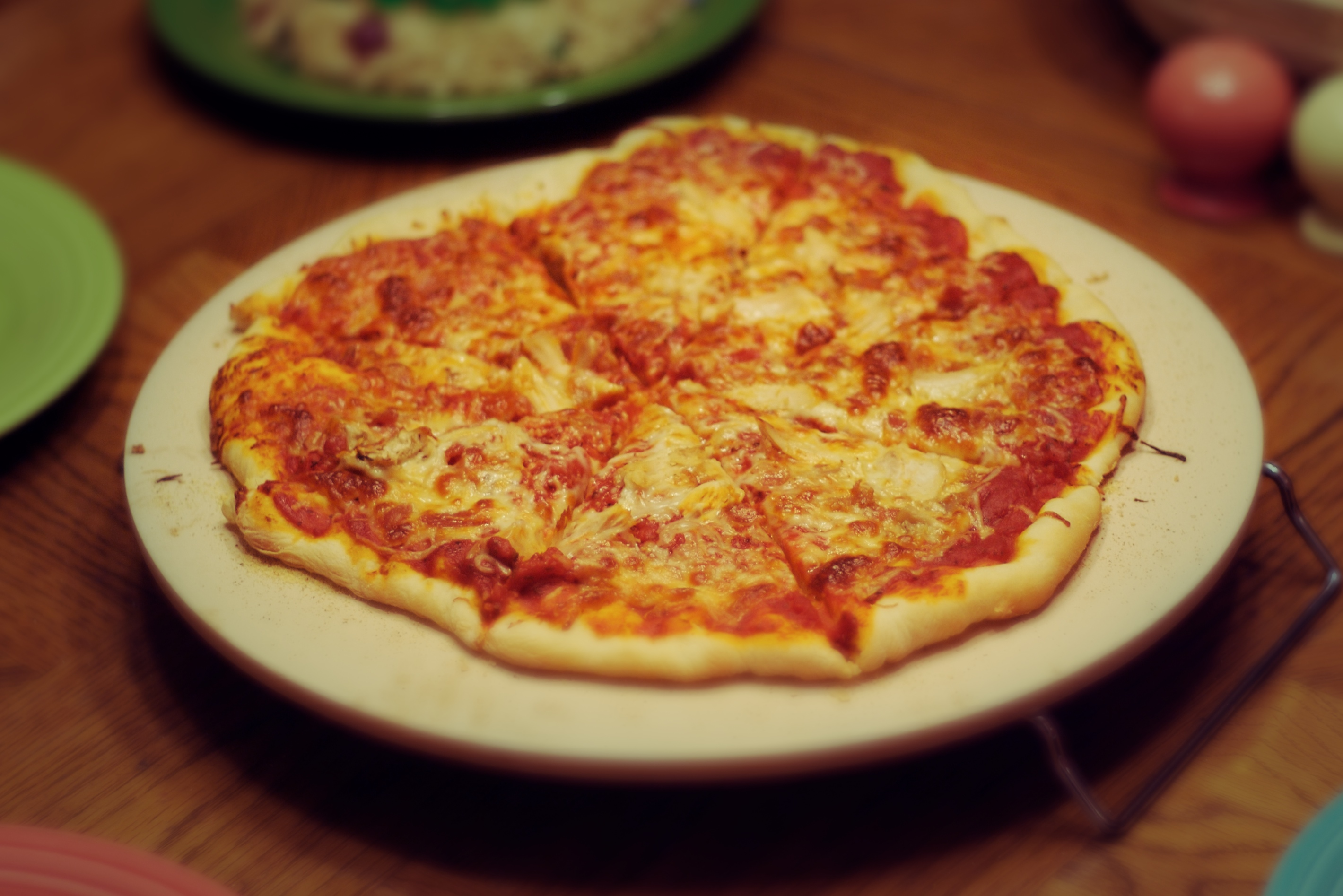
Pizza on a pizza stone

A baking stone is a portable cooking surface used in baking. It may be made of ceramic, stone or, more recently, salt. Food is put on the stone, which is then placed in an oven, though sometimes the stone is heated first. Baking stones are used much like cookie sheets, but may absorb additional moisture for crispier food. A pizza stone is a baking stone designed for cooking pizza.

== Overview ==
Due to the thermal mass of baking stones and the material's property as a poor heat conductor, food is less likely to burn when one uses a baking stone instead of metal or glass bakeware. Baking stones are a variation on hot stone cooking, which is one of the oldest cooking techniques known. Some cooks recommend sprinkling corn meal or flour on the baking stone to prevent the crust from sticking or using parchment paper atop the stone. Baking "stones" may be purchased as unglazed ceramic tiles, unglazed fired clay tiles and quarried tiles, from tile shops and hardware stores.

To prevent fracturing of the stone by thermal shock, some bakers place the baking stone in a cold oven and heat it over at least 45 minutes, then allow it to cool slowly inside the oven after switching it off. Because of the possibility of rapid temperature change, baking stones should not be left in an oven while it is in self cleaning mode.

Baking stones can be cleaned with a dry brush or scouring pad followed by plain hot water. Because it is porous, a baking stone will absorb any fluid it contacts, including detergent. Use of any detergents may taint the stone, imparting the flavor of detergent to foods later cooked on the stone.

== Pizza stone ==
When designed for cooking pizzas, a baking stone is often referred to as a pizza stone. Using a pizza stone more or less mimics the effects of cooking a pizza in a masonry oven. The porous nature of the stone absorbs moisture, resulting in a crispier crust. Small pizza stones can be purchased to fit any conventional cooking oven or an enclosed barbecue-style grill. High-end ovens sometimes offer optional pizza stones that are specifically designed for each oven model and may include a specialized heating element. In addition to traditional methods, a pizza stone can also be made out of metal.

== Pizza / baking steel ==
A usually 16 in (410 mm) long x 16 in (410 mm) wide x 1/4 in (6.4 mm) thick A36 steel plate conducts heat better than stone and is safe to use with any broiler or grill, but gives off too much heat for bread, cookies, and croissants. Its carbon steel is heavier thus it needs to be pre-seasoned before use. The optimal thickness is determined by the oven temperature.

== See also ==
- Earth oven – underground ovens
- Masonry oven – colloquially known as a brick oven or stone oven
