= Collegium (ancient Rome) =

Any association in ancient Rome that acted as a legal entity

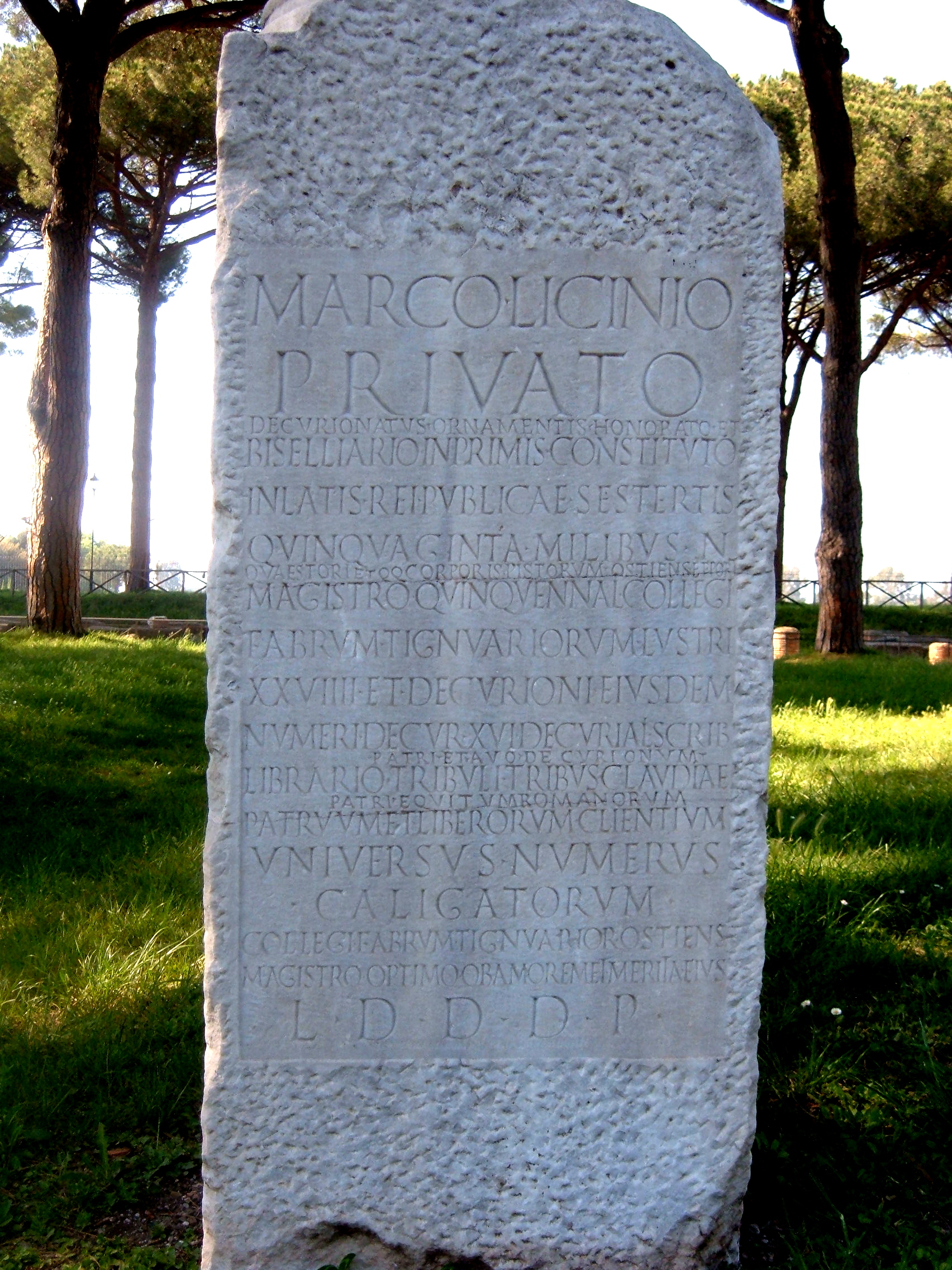
Inscription (CIL 14.374) from Ostia Antica commemorating a Marcus Licinius Privatus, who was magister of a college of carpenters

A collegium (pl.: collegia) or college was any association in ancient Rome that acted as a legal entity. Such associations could be civil or religious. The word collegium literally means "society", from collega ("colleague"). They functioned as social clubs or religious collectives whose members worked towards their shared interests. These shared interests encompassed a wide range of the various aspects of urban life; including political interests, cult practices, professions, trade, and civic services. The social connections fostered by collegia contributed to their influence on politics and the economy; acting as lobbying groups and representative groups for traders and merchants.

Some collegia were linked to participating in political violence and social unrest, which resulted in the suppression of social associations by the Roman government. Following the passage of the lex Julia during the reign of Julius Caesar as consul and dictator of the Roman Republic (49–44 BC), and their reaffirmation during the reign of Caesar Augustus as princeps senatus and imperator of the Roman Army (27 BC – 14 AD), collegia required the approval of the Roman Senate or the Emperor in order to be authorized as legal bodies.

== Civil collegia ==
Collegia could function as guilds, social clubs, or burial societies; in practice, in ancient Rome, they sometimes became organized bodies of local businessmen and even criminals, who ran the mercantile/criminal activities in a given urban region (similar to a rione). Legal collegia possessed certain rights, such as common property, a common treasury, and legal right to an attorney. Large portions of the population of a town could be a part of collegia associations, with many aspects of daily life having corresponding collegia. The organization of a collegium was often modeled on that of civic governing bodies, the Senate of Rome being the epitome. The meeting hall was often known as the curia, the same term as that applied to that of the Roman Senate.

The formation of collegia and other civil organized bodies were subject to the discretion of the central Roman government. After the implementation of Julius Caesar's social reforms between 49 and 44 BC (lex Julia) and their reaffirmation by Augustus, collegia required the approval of the Roman Senate or the emperor in order to be authorized as legal bodies. Collegia were often the target of restrictions and bans as a result of suspicions on the part of the Roman government about the function of these social associations.

The legality of civil collegia was subject to constant legislation. In 64 BC, all civic collegia were banned by the Senate for being against the Roman constitution, only to be restored six years later in 58 BC by Clodius. Part of the social reforms of Julius Caesar's reign disbanded all but the most ancient collegia and instituted that any new collegia had to be deemed by the Senate to be useful to the community. Later in the 2nd century AD, collegia in the Roman world showed signs of an increased tolerance on the part of the Roman government. Under Hadrian, inscriptions in Asia Minor depict collegia that functioned with more freedom as Roman restrictions became smaller and more temporary in scope. The Roman emperor Aurelian imposed state control over collegia in the late 3rd century.

== Religious collegia ==
Religious collegia were formed by fraternities of priests, sanctioned by the Roman government, and provided a number of religious functions in Rome. These included the overseeing of ritual sacrifices, the practice of augury, the keeping of scriptures, the arranging of festivals, and the maintaining of specific religious cults. Along with their religious functions, these kinds of collegia also had funerary and social functions; providing an outlet for fellowship as well as guaranteed burial services for its members.

There were four great religious colleges (quattuor amplissima collegia) of Roman priests, in descending order of importance:

- Pontifices (the College of Pontiffs), headed by the pontifex maximus
- Augures
- Quindecimviri sacris faciundis
- Septemviri epulonum

Other minor religious collegia existed, including:

- Fetiales
- Salii
- Titii
- Fratres Arvales
- Luperci
- Sodales Augustales

== Military collegia ==
Under the Roman Republic and around 100 AD, military collegia were viewed as small and violent militias. Inscriptions at Lambaesis date the formation of Legio III Augusta military clubs to the reign of Septimius Severus (193–211) and indicate that they were formed by petty officers and specialists attached to the various services of the legion. During the Severan dynasty (193–235 AD), when unions, both commercial and industrial, became widespread, the government turned its attention to improving standards of living within the army. The basic purpose of military collegia was to help their members cover their funeral expenses. Officers and personnel assigned to special duties were not forbidden from joining collegia, but average soldiers on active duty could not form collegia or be members of them. Membership in a military collegium gave the officer insurance against unforeseen events requiring any substantial financial investment.

== See also ==
- List of ancient Roman collegia
- Articles of association
- Articles of incorporation
- Articles of organization
- Certificate of incorporation
- Charter
- College of Aesculapius and Hygia
- Congressional charter
- Municipium – municipal authorities
- Royal charter
