= Gastronorm =

Standard of kitchenware sizes

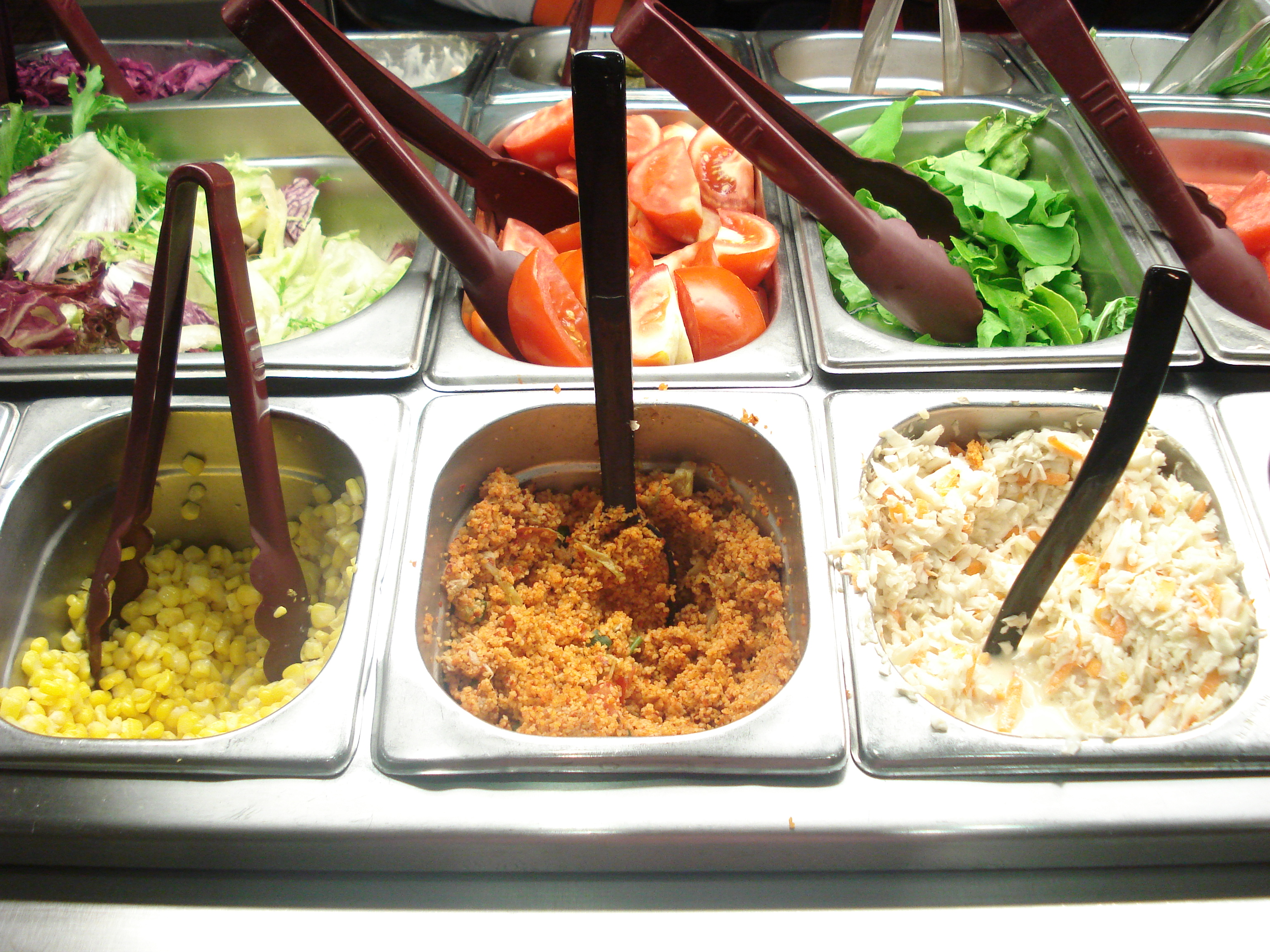
Gastronorm containers in a salad bar

Gastronorm (GN), sometimes spelled Gastro-Norm, is a European standard for kitchenware tray and container sizes that is commonly seen worldwide in the catering and professional food industry, as well as in certain parts of the high-end consumer market. Gastronorm is generally used worldwide except in most of the United States and Canada, which have their own domestic systems. The Gastronorm standard was first introduced in Switzerland in 1964 and became an official European standard in 1993 with the EN 631 standard.

The basic format is called "GN 1/1" and measures 530×325 mm, with other Gastronorm sizes being multiples and fractions of this basic module size. Gastronorm containers allow for flexible, place efficient, and compatible storage, transport, processing, and serving and can be adapted for shelving, transport on trolleys and conveyor belts, secure temporary placement in compatible sinks, working tables, refrigerators, freezers, ovens, hot water baths, and compatible dishwashers, or display. Other products that have adopted the Gastronorm format include cutting boards and non-stick mats. Many professional food products are even packaged for optimal compatibility with Gastronorm containers, such as pizza base sizes, pre-baked breads, or frozen vegetables.

The most commonly used materials for the containers are stainless steel and (transparent or non-transparent) plastic. Stackable baking trays and stainless steel containers are commonly used for cooking in an oven, while polycarbonate and polypropylene variants are suited for storage of cold foods. Porcelain or melamine containers are used for display.

== History ==
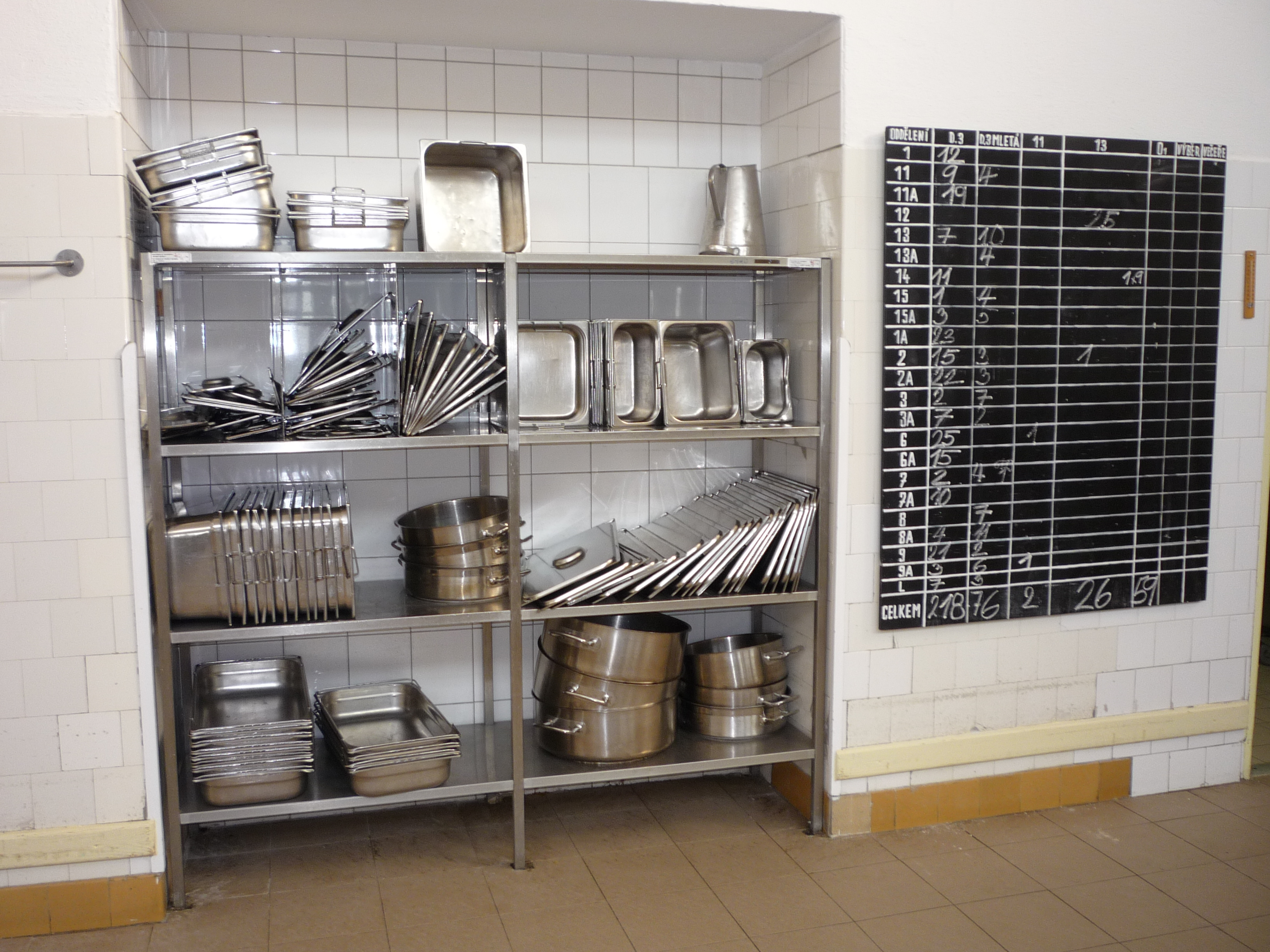
Gastronorm-sized containers and lids stored on a shelf

Gastronorm originated in Switzerland during the 1960s when various associations gathered and agreed on standard dimensions for movable kitchen inserts and containers such as pans, trays, wire racks as well as other kitchen utensils and equipment. The goals of the standard was to maximize use of the capacity in ovens and fridges by introducing kitchenware in compatible square sizes that left no corners unused. The standard was first formalized 17 November 1964 when different Swiss hotel associations gathered and agreed on the basic metric size of 530 × 325 mm. Despite initial skepticism by chefs claiming that "gastronomy cannot be standardized", the Gastronorm (GN) format has since gained worldwide recognition and is used by a large majority of equipment manufacturers and users of professional kitchens worldwide. On 15 December 1993, the format was adopted by the European Committee for Standardization in the standard EN 631-1: 1993 "Materials and articles in contact with foodstuffs - Catering containers - Dimensions of containers". Today almost all professional European kitchen equipment is built according to the gastronorm standard, enabling flexibility of kitchen operations across Europe when it comes to planning, transfer, delivery, storage and production.

== Sizes ==
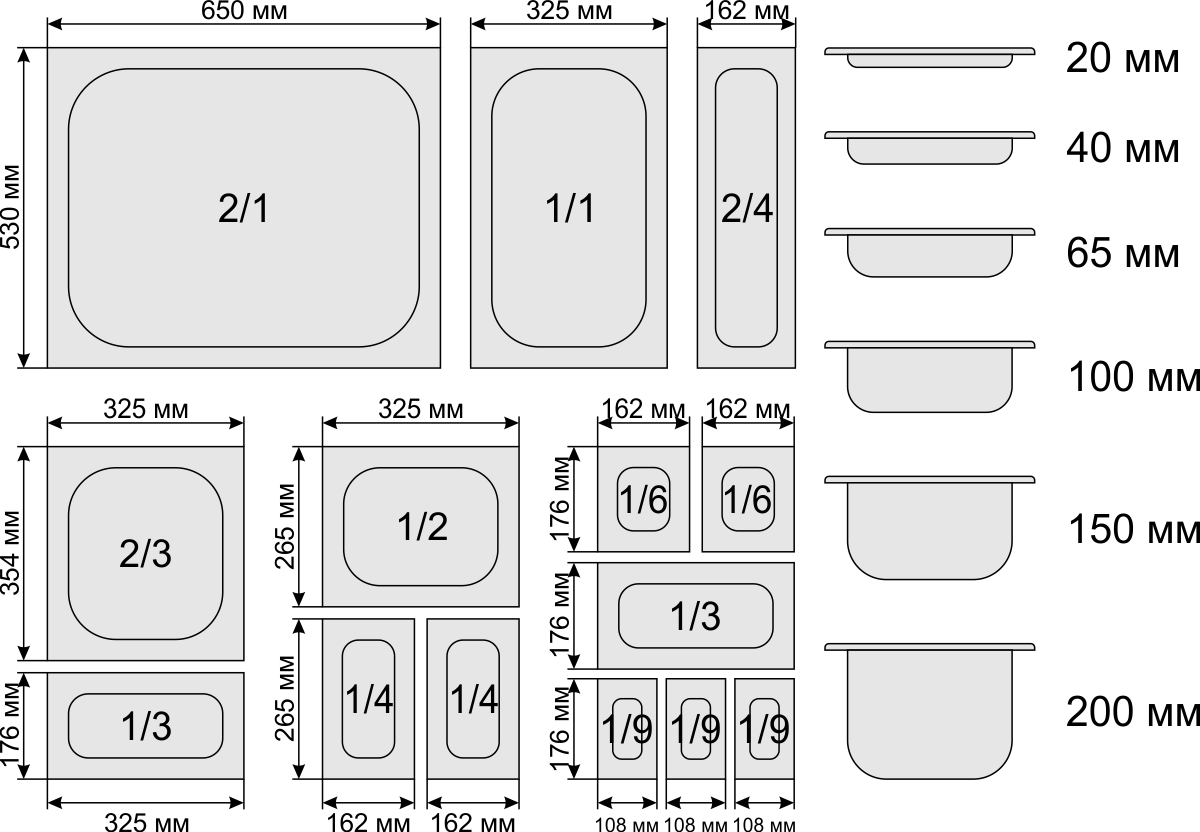
Visual representation of European Gastronorm sizes

The Gastronorm system is based on fractional sizing, making different-sized GN containers interchangeable. For example, a GN 1/1 tray can be substituted with two GN 1/2 containers.

Common Gastronorm Dimensions
Gastronorm size	Dimensions (mm)
GN2/1	650 × 530
GN1/1	530 × 325
GN2/3	355 × 325
GN2/4	530 × 162
GN1/2	325 × 265
GN1/3	325 × 176
GN1/4	265 × 162
GN1/6	176 × 162
GN1/9	176 × 108

Containers usually come in standard depths of 20 mm, 40 mm, 65 mm, 100 mm, 150 mm, 200 mm.

Drain lids and lids with cut-outs such that a serving utensil can be placed into the container are common accessories. They are made in these sizes especially for the catering industry. There are also covers in the same measurements: GN 1/1, GN 1/2, GN 1/3, GN 2/1, GN 1/4, GN 1/6, GN 1/9, GN 2/3.

Other less common sizes are:

Less Common Gastronorm Dimensions
Gastronorm size	Dimensions (mm)
GN2/8	324 x 132
GN1/12	162 x 88
GN2/24	132 x 108
GN1/18	108 x 88

== Materials ==
Containers can be made of stainless steel, enameled steel, metal covered with a non-stick surface, synthetic or composite materials, earthenware or porcelain. Containers can either have a closed or perforated bottom to facilitate draining or certain specialized types of cooking. Recently, fully compostable Gastronorm trays have also been introduced.

== Examples of use ==
- Electrical kitchen equipment: Gastronorm compatible kitchen equipment such as bain-maries that are designed solely to hold Gastronorm containers are available. Large mobile racks or serving carts are also available for storage and portability.
- Combi steamers: Both commercial and professional combi steamers typically utilize food racks with dimensions corresponding to Gastronorm specifications, most commonly either GN1/1 or GN2/3.
- Plates: A few companies (such as Olympia, Emile Henry, Genware) manufacture ranges of white porcelain dishes in Gastronorm sizes as serveware including decorative lids.
- Serving trays: Gastronorm-sized stainless steel or plastic serving plates are available.
- Bread warmers
- Colanders: Pans with holes so that ingredients can be drained. Can also be used for steaming inside an oven, or to soak the ingredients in an ice bath.
- Dishwashers
- Cutting boards: Gastronorm compatible cutting board are available, for example in the sizes 1/1 and 1/2. For instance as an integral tray that slots in beneath chopping boards, so that food chops can be pushed easily into the tray for either later use or disposal.
- Chafing dish: Food stands are available which accepts Gastronorm sized pans and has an alcohol burner to keep food warm (above 60 °C (140 °F)), for example at a buffet.

== Gallery ==
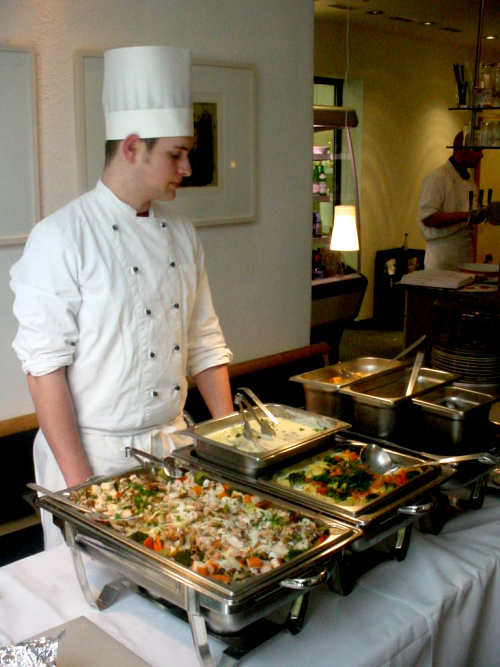
Gastronorm food warmers

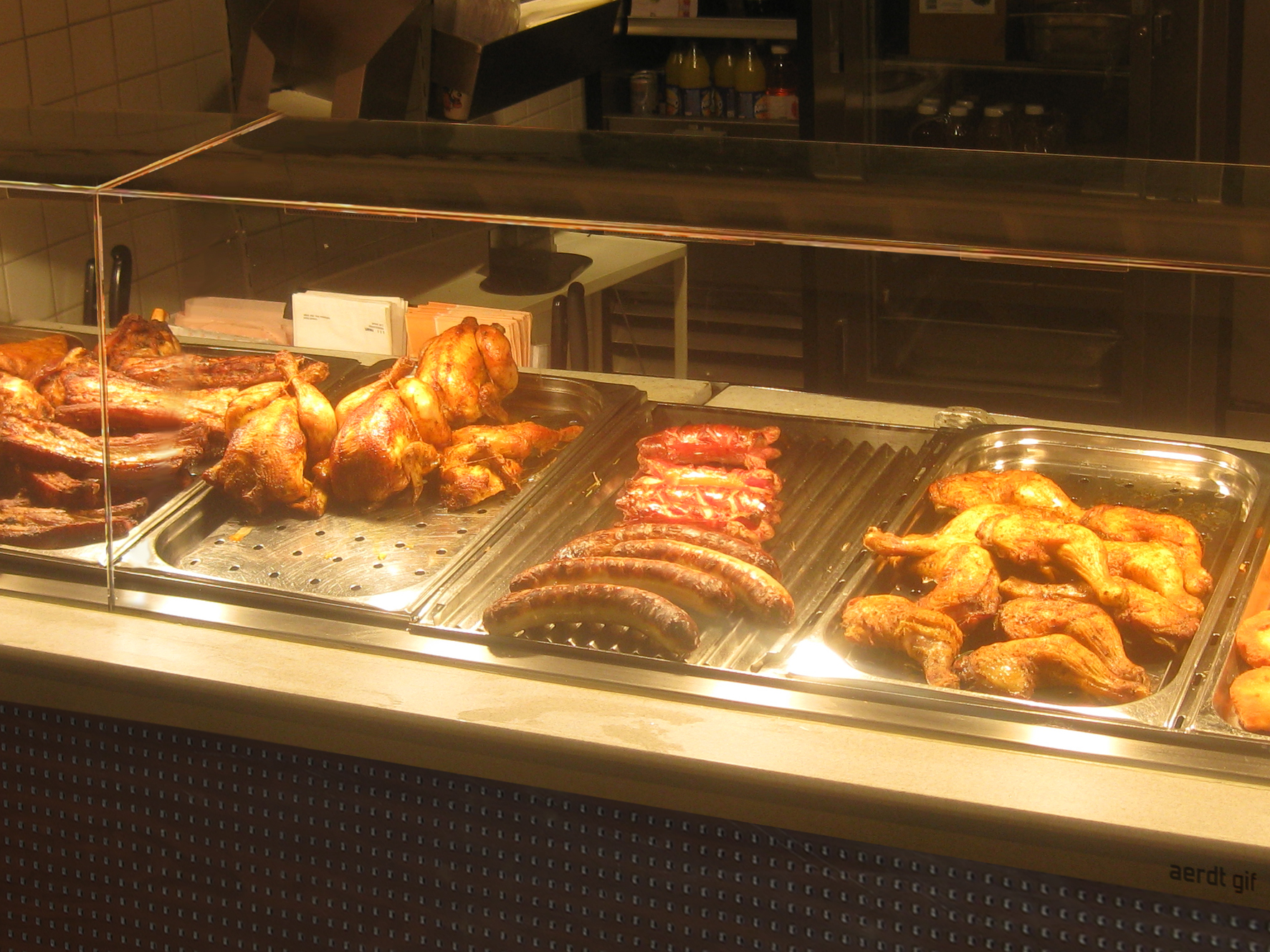
Gastronorm bains-marie

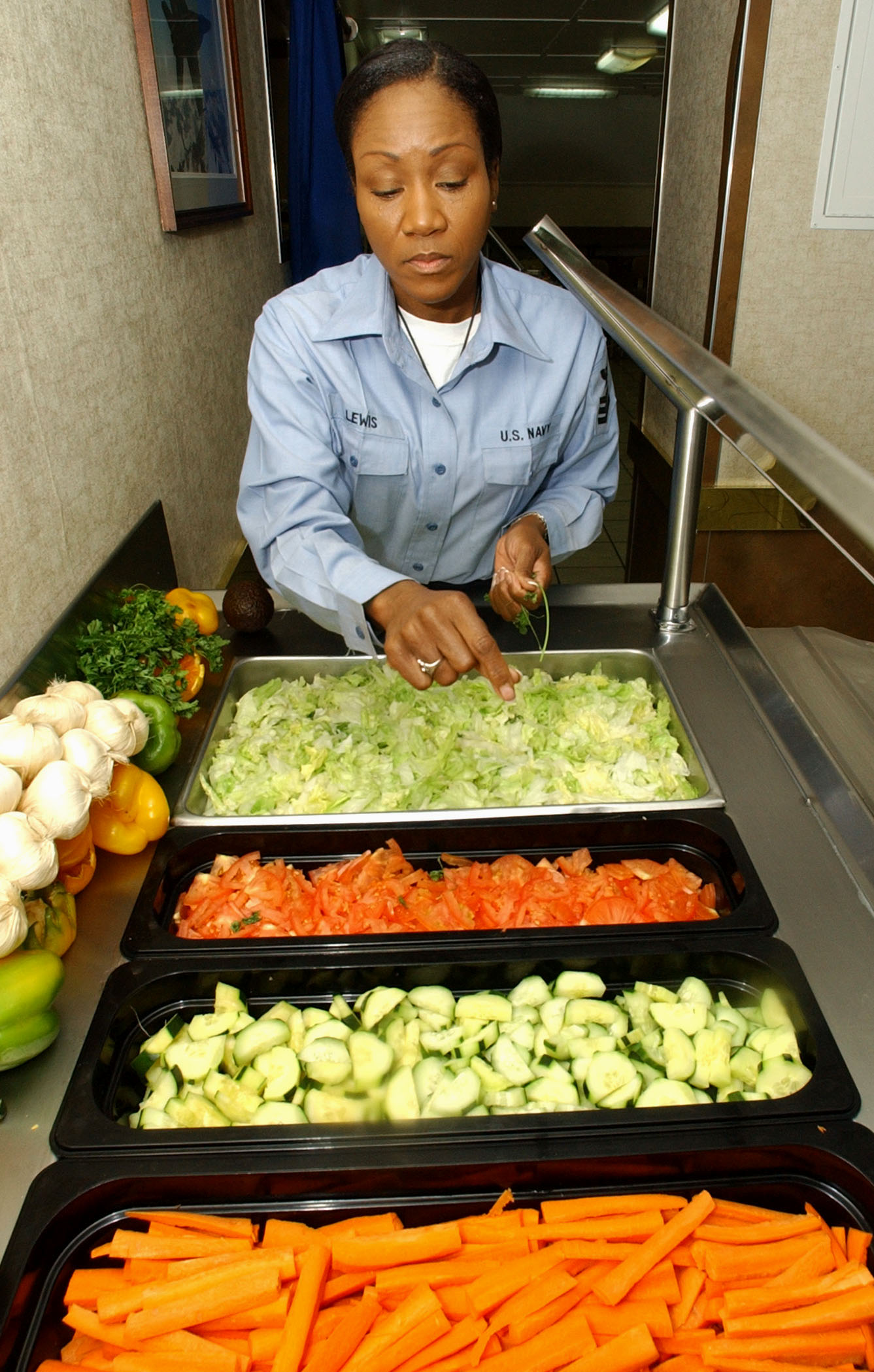
Gastronorm containers used in a canteen

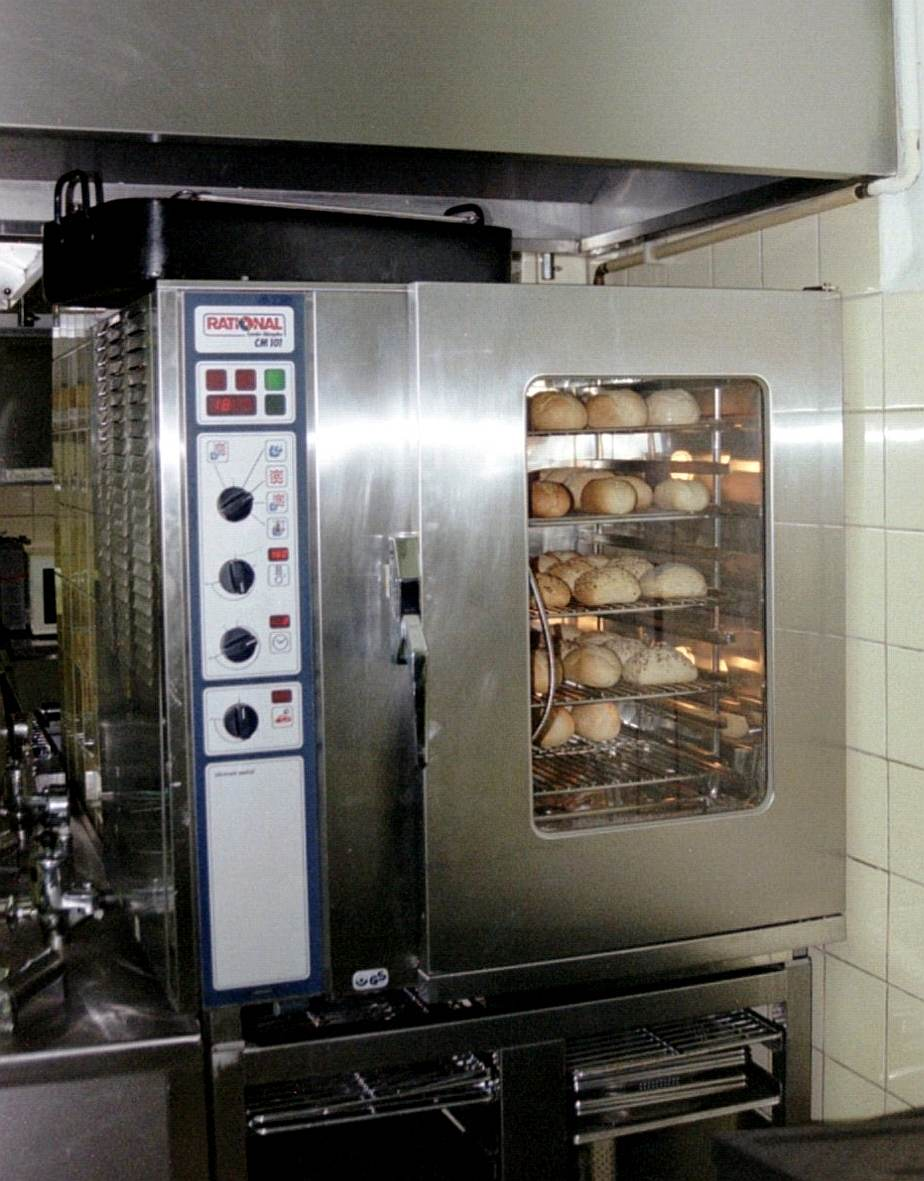
Gastronorm-sized oven

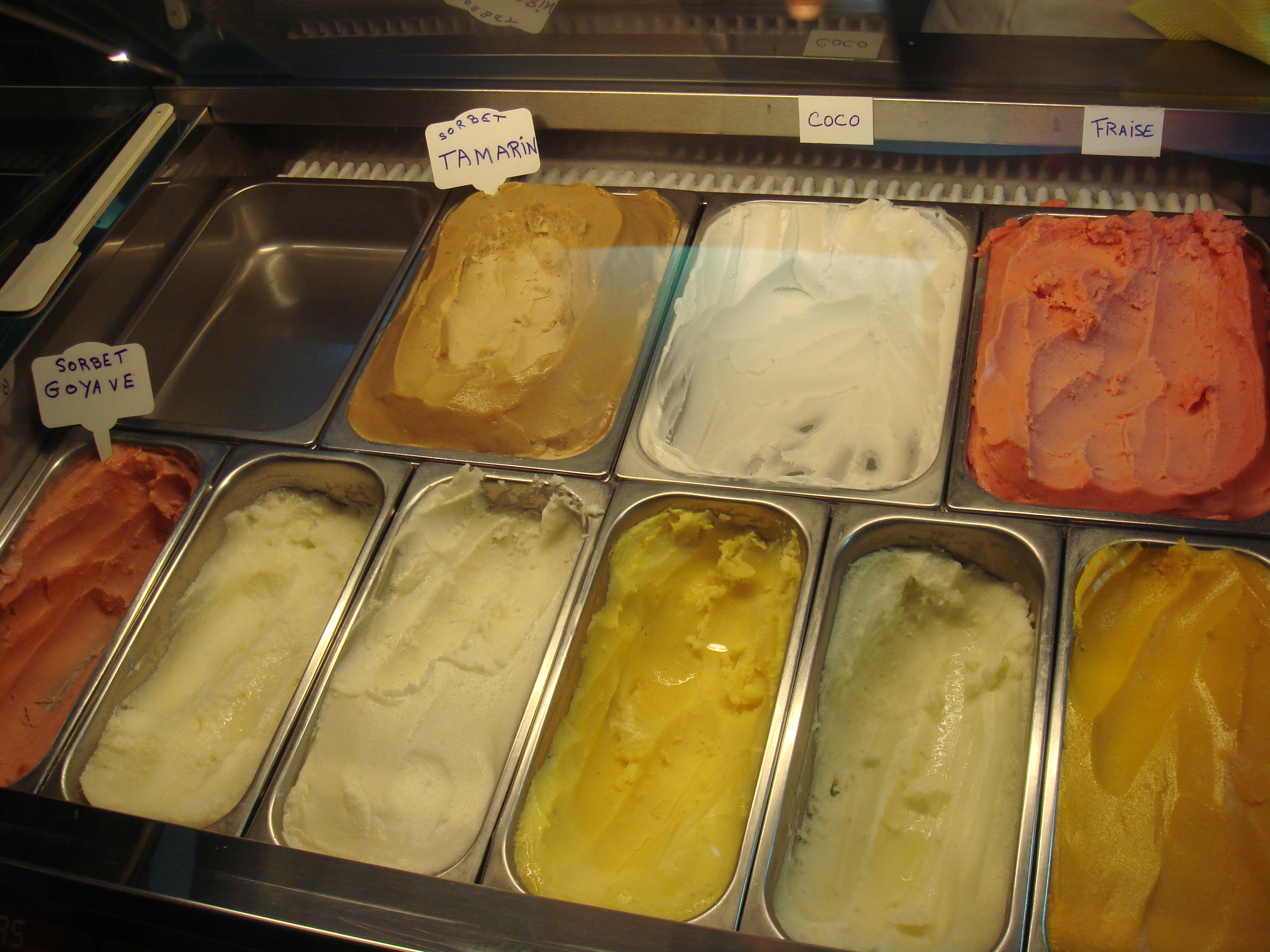
Gastronorm containers used in an ice cream parlor

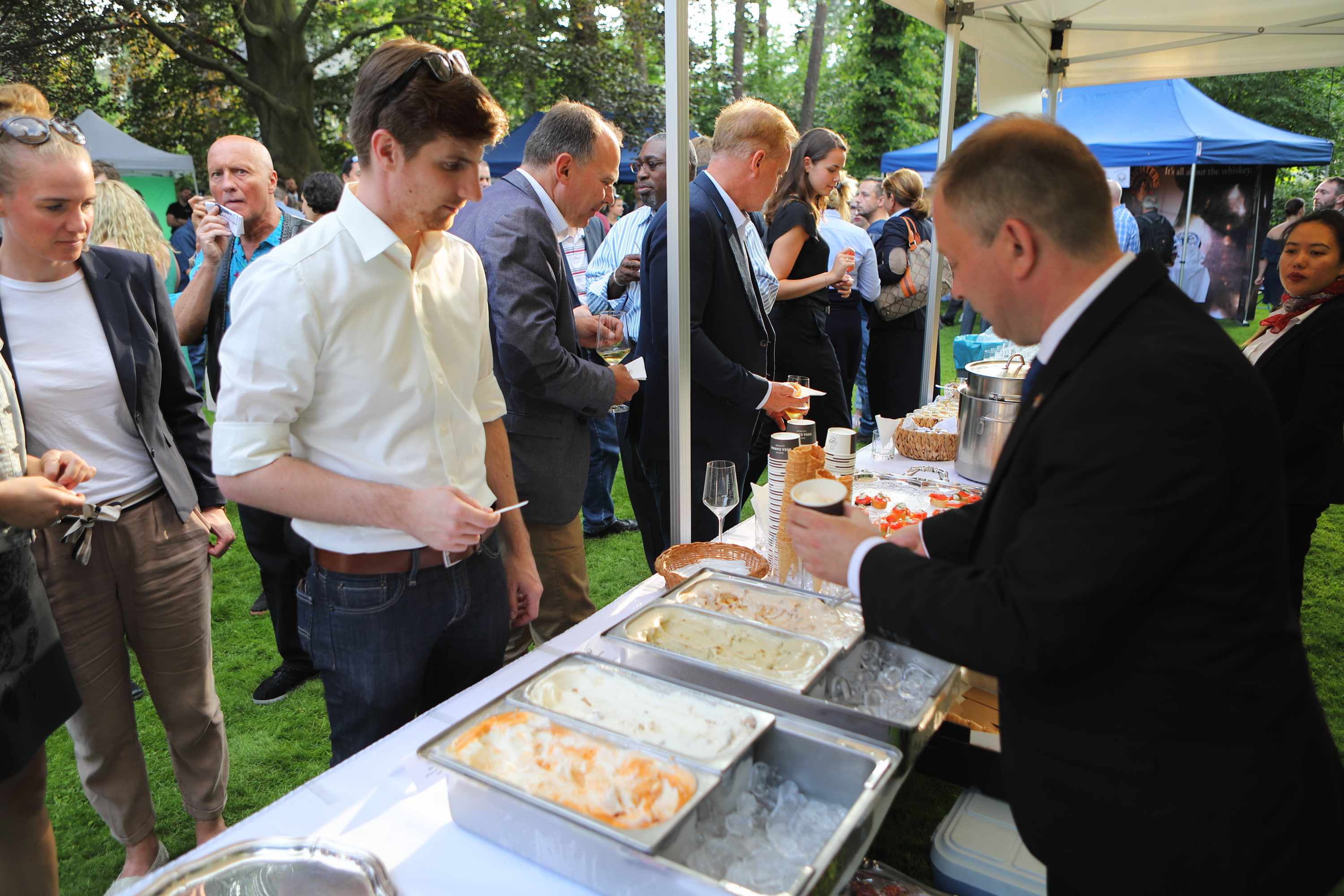
Ice cream served from stacked Gastronorm containers with ice between

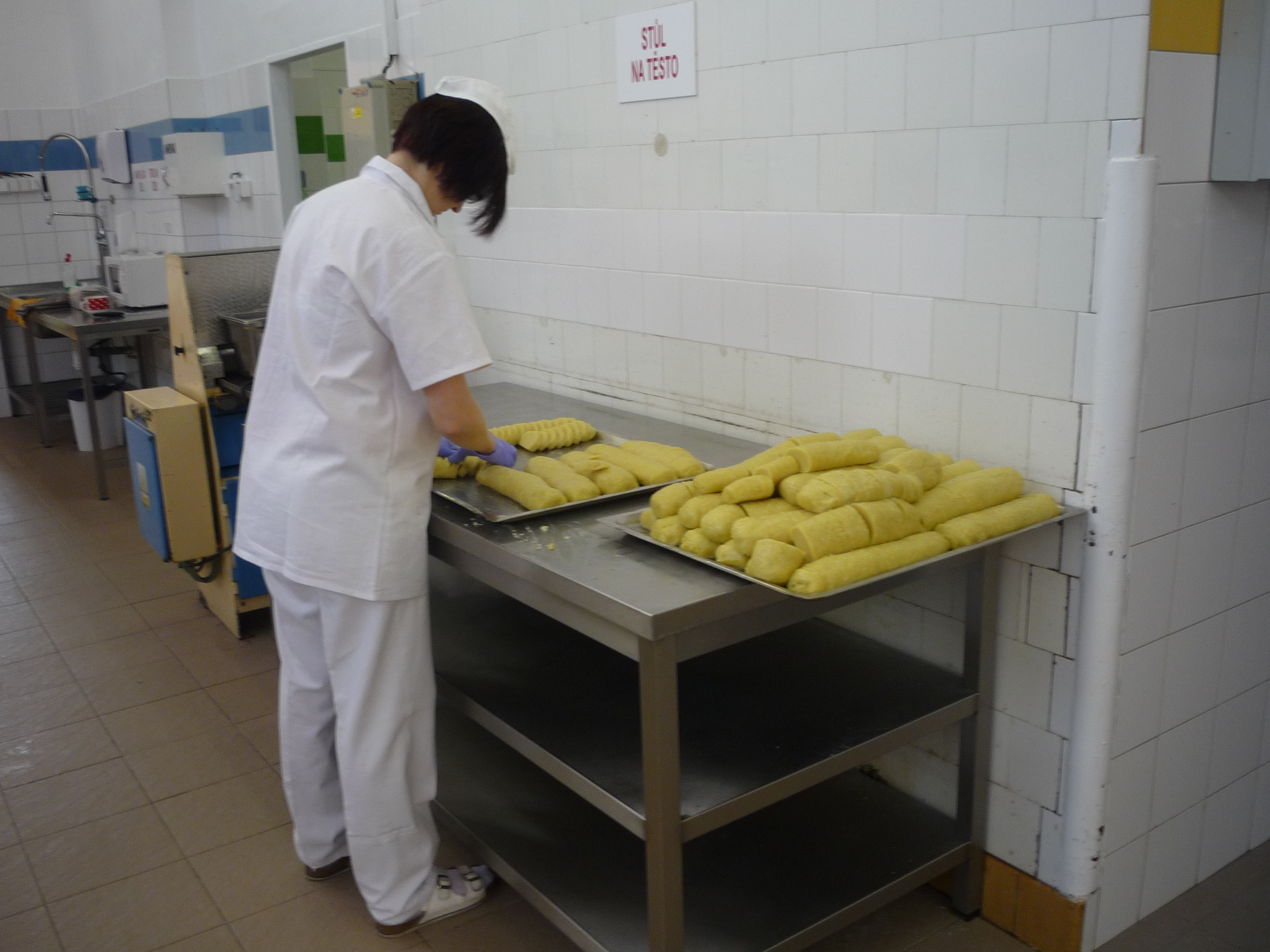
Gastronorm-sized baking trays

== Competing standards ==
Professional kitchen equipment from America are often not built according to Gastronorm, but rather to national non-metric size standards. Both Gastronorm and non-Gastronorm pans are sometimes referred to as "hotel pans", "steam table pans", "service pans" or "counter pans", but such names do not say anything about the underlying standard to which the equipment is constructed. Similar to Gastronorm, the American hotel pan system is based on a system of fractions, but with measurements which are non-metric and incompatible with Gastronorm. Hence, US pans can also be stacked and fit inside each other, similar to Gastronorm, but the two systems are incompatible.

Common American hotel pans
American size	Dimensions	
American size	inches	(mm)
US Full Size Pan	12 × 20	305 × 508
US Two-Thirds Pan	12 × 13 1/3	305 × 339
US Half Pan	12 × 10	305 × 254
US Half Pan Long	6 × 20	152 × 508
US Third Pan	12 × 6 2/3	305 × 169
US Quarter Pan	6 × 10	152 × 254
US Sixth Pan	6 × 6 2/3	152 × 169
US Ninth Pan	4 × 6 2/3	102 × 169

Depth of American pans are referred to with numbers such as 100, 200, 400, 600 and 800, which roughly indicates their depth in inches when divided by 100. For example, a "200 pan" is about 2 1/2 in (64 mm) deep. American hotel pans are also available in different steel gauges, which refers to the thickness of the metal. A higher number means a thinner pan, so a 20 gauge pan is thicker than a 22 gauge. US sized pans are also available with either wide or narrow brims. A narrow brim pan can be placed inside a wide brim pan to make an improvised bain-marie.

== See also ==
- Cooking weights and measures
- Sheet pan
- Preferred metric sizes
- Eurocontainer, a system for boxes that can be used for reusable packaging for transport and storage
