= History of catering =

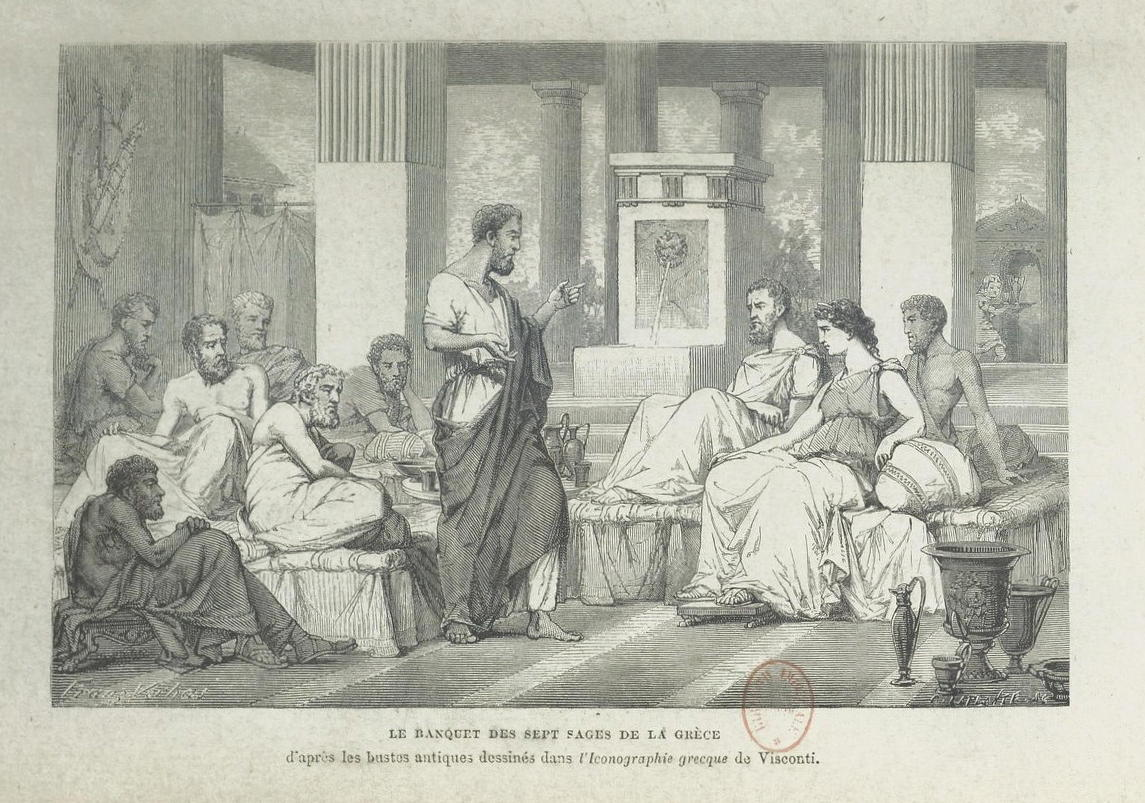
Banquet of seven sages

The history of catering involves the development and evolution of the service industry that provides food, beverage, and other event services. The word catering comes from the Latin word cater, which means to provide. The business of providing food for parties, meetings, and other gatherings has been around for millennia, with traces back to ancient civilizations. Over time, this profession has grown and evolved into the diverse industry it is today.

== Ancient catering ==
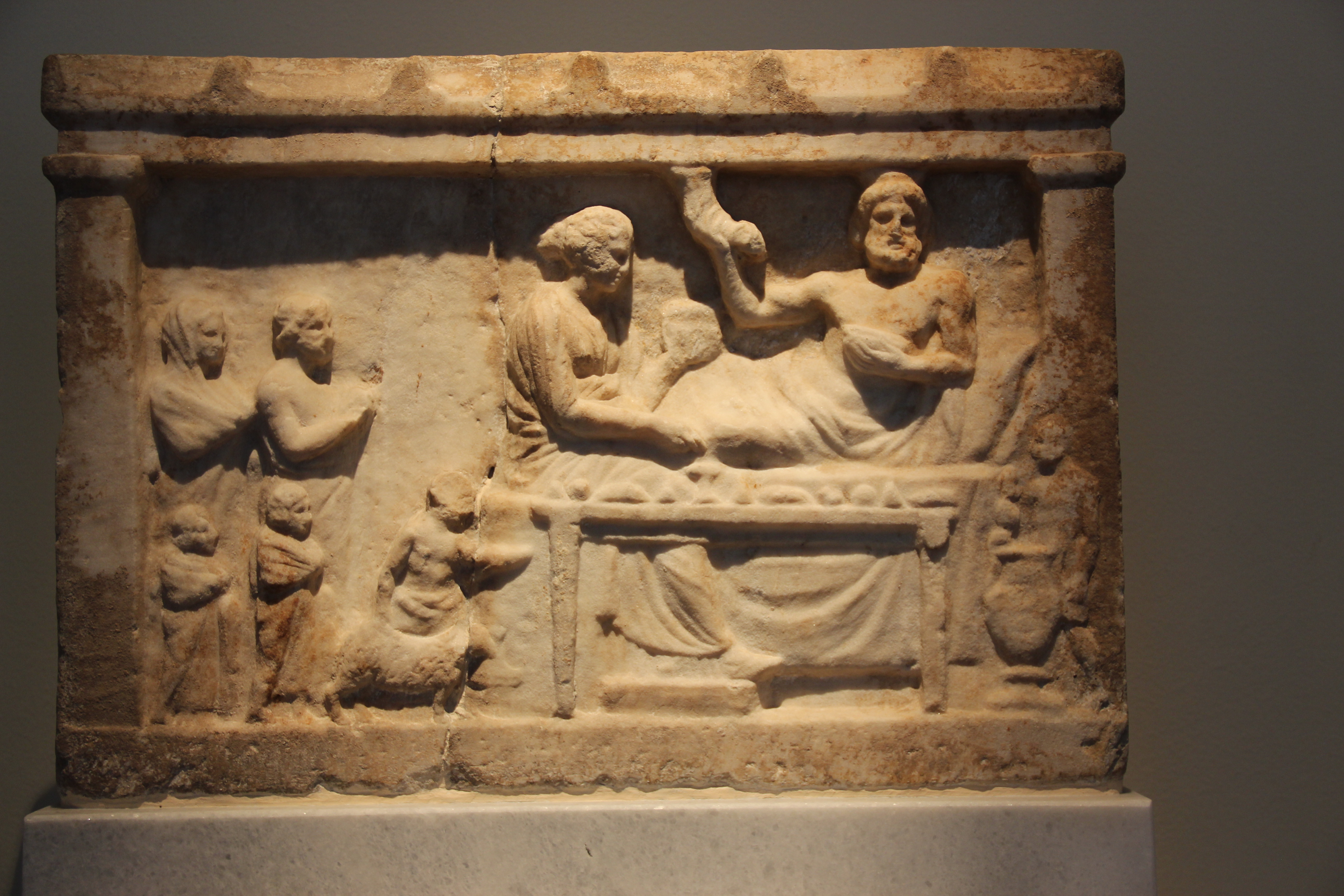
Ancient Greece Marble Votive Relief of a Funerary Banquet

The concept of catering can be traced back to ancient times such as in civilizations like Ancient Egypt, Greece, and Rome where large banquets were commonly held by the ruling classes, requiring the services of cooks and servers to prepare and distribute the food.

In Ancient China, the royals and aristocrats would host grand banquets during festivals and on special occasions, employing professional cooks who would later influence the culinary arts and catering practices.

These events were often held to honor the gods, celebrate military victories, or simply demonstrate wealth and power.

The catering industry of this time was largely a part of royal and noble households. Food was a vital part of their culture and religious practices, and many of the foods prepared for these events, such as bread, fish, and various types of meat, were commonly found in the diet of these civilizations.

The role of a caterer in ancient times was typically filled by slaves or servants who were responsible for food preparation and serving.

== Medieval catering ==
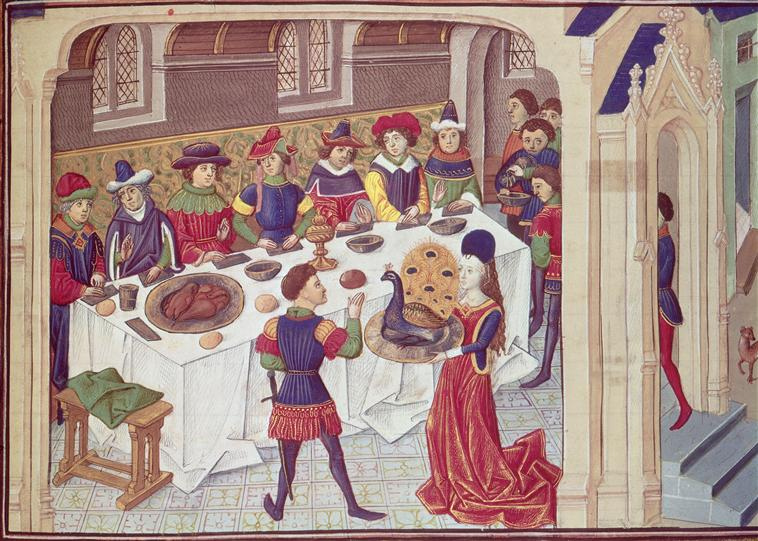
Banquet du paon

In the Middle Ages, the catering industry began to develop more structure. The cooks and servers were often part of the household staff in a noble or royal house.

In England, the position of "Master of the Revels" was established, who was responsible for managing royal entertainment, including food preparation and presentation. Banquets and feasts remained a popular way of celebrating occasions and showing hospitality.

The Middle Ages saw a shift in catering services with the establishment of taverns and inns, which played a key role in providing food for travelers. However, large-scale feasts and banquets were still primarily in the domain of the nobility. Medieval cuisine was heavily influenced by religious dietary rules and the seasonal availability of food. The advent of trade routes and the crusades led to an exchange of culinary ideas and ingredients. During this period, the use of spices became prevalent, and new techniques for preparing and presenting food were developed.

== Renaissance catering ==
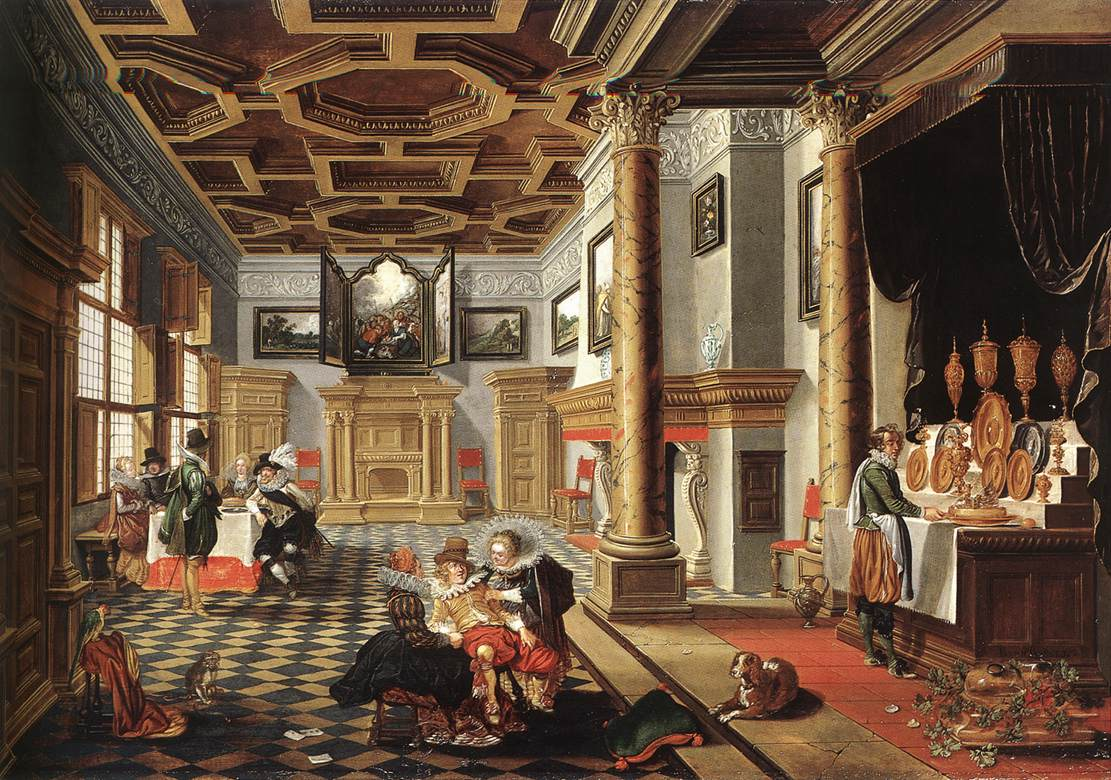
Bassen, Bartholomeus van, Renaissance Interior with Banqueters, 1618-20

The Renaissance period transformed catering practices and gave rise to professional guilds for cooks and servers. Food presentation became an art form, and banquets were often showcases for new culinary creations. Spices were widely used, and there was a focus on using fresh, local ingredients. Catering services were frequently offered by inns and taverns, which had become social hubs. The development of cookbooks during this era reflects the growing sophistication of catering and culinary arts.

== See also ==
- Food service
- Catering
