= Catering =

Commercial food service

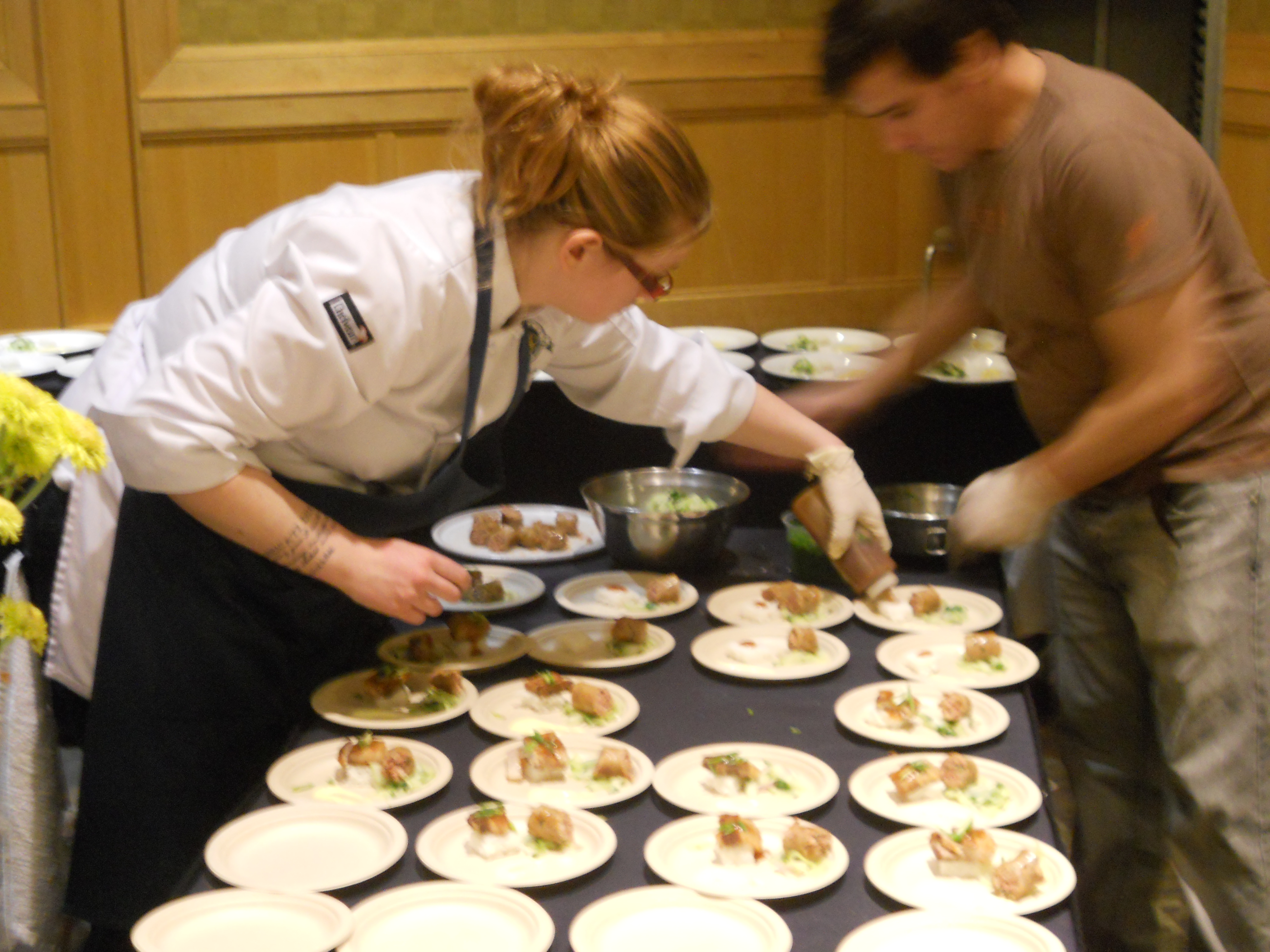
Caterers preparing for a formal event

Catering is the business of providing food and beverages at a variety of venues, including private residences, banquet halls, special event spaces, hotels, business parks, festivals, film locations/studios, and other locations. Catering can be either on-site, in which food is prepared at the same location it is served (on-premise), or off-site, in which food is prepared at one location but served somewhere else (off-premise).

Catering service is either full-service (with staff setting up, serving, and cleaning up), or drop-off/pickup.

Generally, in the US, catering is served to a group and is based on a common menu. Restaurants, where guests choose individual dishes from a menu, are not considered caterers; a restaurant may offer catering services, however. In British usage the term catering also includes restaurant and pub food service.

In the UK, the Food Standards Agency serves as a model for food safety practices in places like restaurants, cafes, takeaways and other food service and catering establishments. They provide recommended guidelines on preventing cross-contamination, ensuring proper cleaning, chilling, cooking, management of food and specific guidelines for diary foods to prevent the risk of foodborne illnesses.

A caterer is someone who specializes in catering.

== Modern catering ==
The history of catering reckons back to ancient times.

The earliest account of major services being catered in the United States was an event for William Howe of Philadelphia in 1778. The event served local foods that were a hit with the attendees, who eventually popularized catering as a career. The official industry began to be recognized around the 1820s, with the caterers being disproportionately African American. The catering business began to form around 1820, centered in Philadelphia.

=== Robert Bogle ===
The industry began to professionalize under Robert Bogle who is recognized as "the originator of catering." Catering was originally done by servants of wealthy elites. Butlers and house slaves, who were often black, were in a good position to become caterers. Essentially, caterers in the 1860s were "public butlers" as they organized and executed the food aspect of a social gathering. A public butler was a butler working for several households. Bogle took on the role of public butler and took advantage of the food service market in the hospitality field.

Caterers like Bogle were involved with events likely to be catered today, such as weddings and funerals. Bogle also is credited with creating the Guild of Caterers and helping train other black caterers. This is important because catering provided not only jobs to black people but also opportunities to connect with elite members of Philadelphia society. Over time, the clientele of caterers became the middle class, who could not afford lavish gatherings; also, increasing competition from white caterers led to a decline in black catering businesses.

=== Evolution of catering ===
By the 1840s many restaurant owners began to combine catering services with their shops. Second-generation caterers grew the industry on the East Coast, becoming more widespread. Common usage of the word "caterer" came about in the 1880s at which point local directories began to use these term to describe the industry. White businessmen took over the industry by the 1900s, with the Black catering population disappearing.

In the 1930s, the Soviet Union, creating more simple menus, began developing state public catering establishments as part of its collectivization policies. A rationing system was implemented during World War II, and people became used to public catering. After the Second World War, many businessmen embraced catering as an alternative way of staying in business after the war. By the 1960s, the home-made food was overtaken by eating in public catering establishments.

By the 2000s, personal chef services started gaining popularity, with more women entering the workforce. People between 15 and 24 years of age spent as little as 11–17 minutes daily on food preparation and clean-up activities in 2006–2016, according to figures revealed by the American Time Use Survey conducted by the US Bureau of Labor Statistics. There are many types of catering, including Event catering, Wedding Catering and Corporate Catering.

== Event catering ==
An event caterer serves food at indoor and outdoor events, including corporate and workplace events and parties at home and venues.

== Mobile catering ==
A mobile caterer serves food directly from a vehicle, cart or truck which is designed for the purpose. Mobile catering is common at outdoor events such as concerts, workplaces, and downtown business districts. Mobile catering services require less maintenance costs when compared with other catering services. Mobile caterers may also be known as food trucks in some areas. Mobile catering is popular throughout New York City, though sometimes can be unprofitable. Ice cream vans are a familiar example of a catering truck in Canada, the United States and the United Kingdom.

== Canapé catering ==
A canapé caterer serves canapés at events. They have become a popular type of food at events, Christmas parties and weddings. A canapé is a type of hors d'oeuvre, a small, prepared, and often decorative food, consisting of a small piece of bread or pastry. They should be easier to pick up and not be bigger than one or two bites. The bite-sized food is usually served before the starter or main course or alone with drinks at a drinks party.

Canapes are small, elegant appetisers designed to be eaten in one or two bites, often showcasing both taste and aesthetic appeal. Unlike ordinary hors d’oeuvres, they are curated to make a statement, reflecting the sophistication and style of the event.

== Wedding catering ==
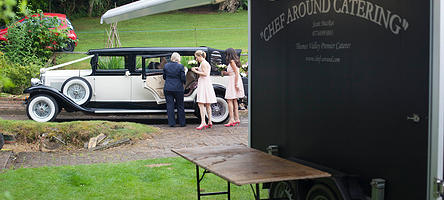
An example of wedding catering

A wedding caterer provides food for a wedding reception and party, traditionally called a wedding breakfast. A wedding caterer can be hired independently or can be part of a package designed by the venue. There are many different types of wedding caterers, each with their approach to food.

== Shipboard catering ==
Merchant ships – especially ferries, cruise liners, and large cargo ships – often carry Catering Officers. In fact, the term "catering" was in use in the world of the merchant marine long before it became established as a land-bound business.

== See also ==
- Aircraft ground handling
- Airline meal
- Food truck
- Gastronorm, a European standard for food container sizes
- Online food ordering
