= Biscuit (bread) =

Type of bread

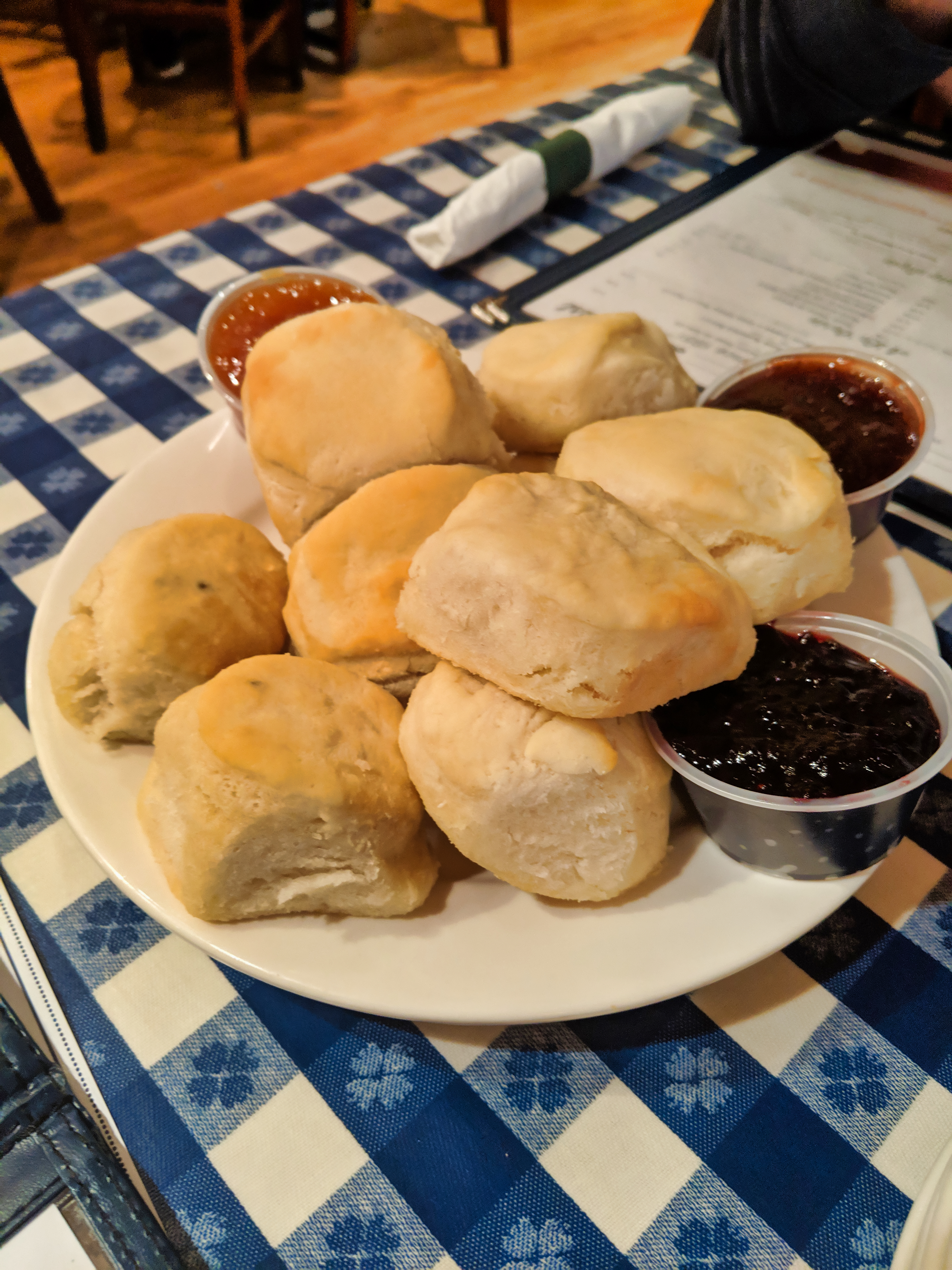
- Biscuits with jam
- Type: Quick bread
- Course: Breakfast, lunch, dinner
- Place of origin: United States, Canada
- Main ingredients: Flour, baking powder or sodium bicarbonate, solid fat (such as butter), buttermilk, and salt

In the United States and Canada, a biscuit is a variety of quick bread with a firm, dry exterior and a soft, moist, crumbly interior, usually made on the spot for prompt eating. It is made with baking powder, baking soda, or a combination of the two as a leavening agent rather than yeast, and at times is called a baking powder biscuit to differentiate it from other types. Biscuits are often served with butter or other condiments, flavored with other ingredients, or combined with other types of food to make sandwiches or other dishes.

Biscuits developed from hardtack, which was first made from only flour and water, to which lard and then baking powder were added later.

== Classification ==
Biscuits and scones are both quick breads with similar ingredients, but they differ in several respects. Biscuits are always made with a solid fat such as butter or vegetable shortening, whereas scones can be made with liquid cream. Biscuit recipes contain more fat and less liquid than scones. Scone recipes usually also include an egg. The mixing technique is also different, resulting in flakier, fluffier biscuits with laminated layers, compared to crumblier, denser scones.

Compared to the American style of scones, which tend to be sweet and have flavorful ingredients mixed in, biscuits tend to be plain, unflavored, and unsweetened. Flavored biscuits usually contain cheese or herbs.

== History ==
Early hard biscuits were a simple, storable version of bread. The word "biscuit" itself originates from the medieval Latin word biscoctus, meaning "twice-cooked". The modern Italian baked goods known as biscotti (also meaning "twice-cooked" in Italian) most closely resemble the Medieval Latin item and cooking technique.

Ship's biscuits were first referenced in the 12th century in a journey Richard I took to Cyprus. They were made of barley, rye and bean flour. The British Royal Navy used hard, flour-based biscuits that would keep for long journeys at sea but would also become so difficult to chew that they had to be softened up. These were first introduced in 1588 to the rations of ships and found their way into the New World by the 1700s at the latest.

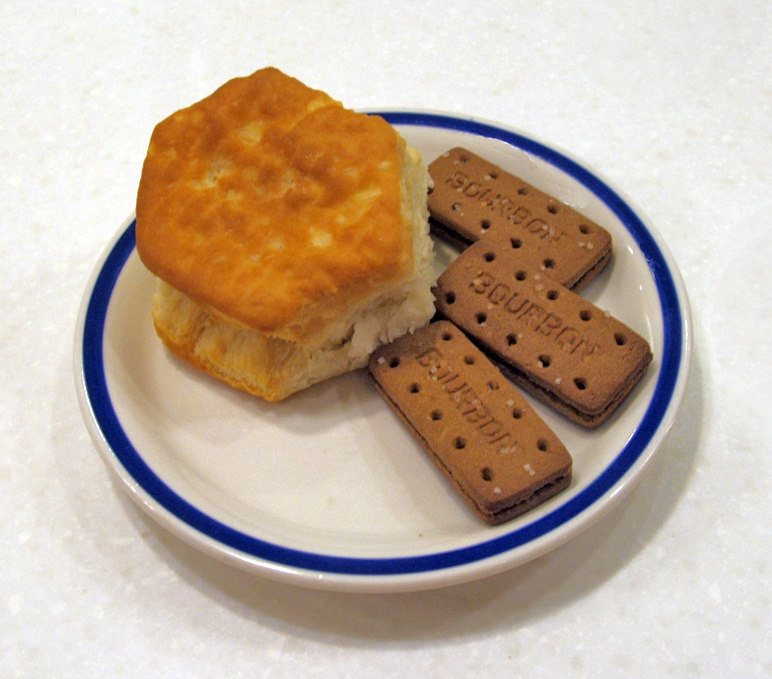
American and British biscuits

Early British settlers in the United States brought with them a simple, easy style of cooking, most often based on ground wheat and warmed with gravy. Most were not wealthy men and women, and so it was a source of cheap nutrition. Over time the term biscuit came to be associated in America primarily with a bread-like side accompanying a meal, while in most of the English-speaking world it came to refer only to a thin, hard baked good.

In the early 19th century, before the American Civil War, cooks created biscuits as a cheaply produced addition for their meals that required no yeast, which was expensive and difficult to store. With no leavening agents except the bitter-tasting pearlash available, beaten biscuits were laboriously beaten and folded to incorporate air into the dough which expanded when heated in the oven causing the biscuit to rise. In eating, the advantage of the biscuit over a slice of bread was that it was harder, and hence kept its shape when wiping up gravy in the popular combination biscuits and gravy.

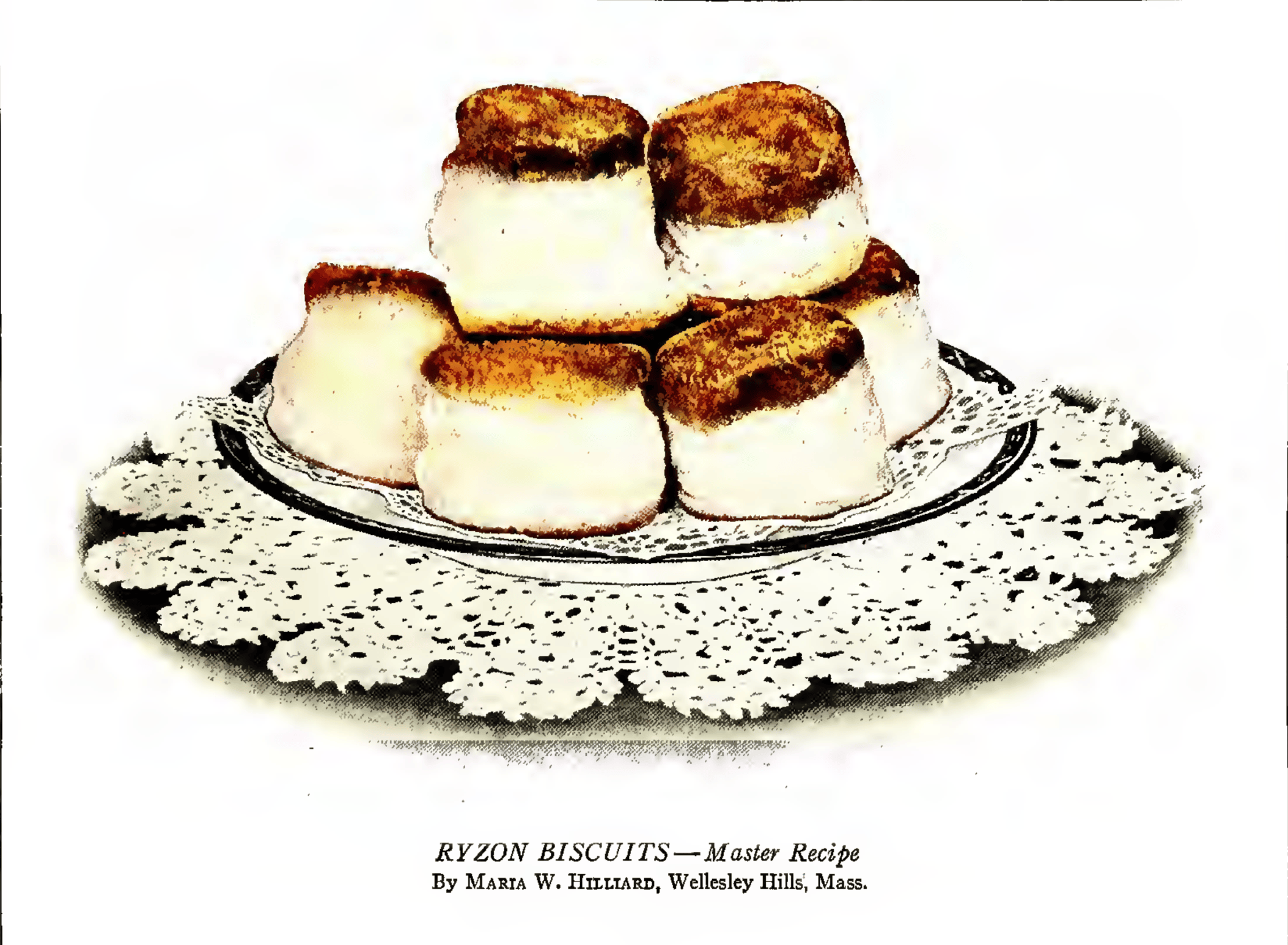
Biscuit Bread, from a 1917 recipe book

Southern chefs may have had an advantage in creating biscuits. Southern American bleached all-purpose flours, originally grown in the Carolinas, Georgia and Tennessee before national food distribution networks, are made from the soft winter wheat that grows in the warm Southern summer. This summer growth results in wheat that has less protein, which is more suited to the creation of quick breads, as well as cookies, cakes and muffins. Northern American all-purpose flours, mainly grown in Ohio, Indiana and Illinois, are made from hard spring wheats that grow in the North's colder climate.

In 1875, Alexander P. Ashbourne patented the first biscuit cutter in the United States, useful for making cookies, cakes, or baking powder biscuits. It consisted of a board to roll the biscuits out on, which was hinged to a metal plate with various biscuit cutter shapes mounted to it.

Pre-shaped ready-to-bake biscuits can be purchased in supermarkets, in the form of small refrigerated cylindrical segments of dough encased in a cardboard can. These refrigerator biscuits were patented by Ballard and Ballard in 1931.

In recent years, food franchises that focus on biscuits have gained popularity in the United States such as Bojangles originating from North Carolina in 1977 and Tudor's Biscuit World in West Virginia in 1980. Biscuit franchises tend to cluster in the Southern part of the United States where Southern American bleached all-purpose flours were originally used in cooking.

== Preparing ==
Originally, biscuits were little more than wheat flour and water, baked to form hardtack, which was carried by travelers because it stored for long periods of time. By the early 1800s, commercial baking powder was developed and the biscuit took a form that resembles the modern biscuit.

A typical modern recipe will include baking powder or baking soda, flour, salt, shortening or butter, and milk or buttermilk. The percentages of these ingredients vary as historically the recipe would pass orally from family to family and generation to generation. Biscuits are almost always a savory food item. Sugar is rare or included in only small quantities, and was not part of the traditional recipe. Self-rising flour can be used, which combines leavening agents with flour to simplify mixing.

Biscuits can be prepared for baking in several ways. The dough can be rolled out flat and cut into rounds, which expand when baked into flaky-layered cylinders (rolled biscuits). If extra liquid is added, the dough's texture changes to resemble stiff pancake batter so that small spoonfuls can be dropped upon the baking sheet to produce drop biscuits, which are more amorphous in texture and shape.

Although most biscuits are made without yeast, a type of biscuit called an angel biscuit contains yeast as well, as do those made with a sourdough starter.

== Serving ==
Biscuits may be eaten for breakfast. They are meant to be served warm with a choice of spread of butter, honey, cane syrup, or some fruit-based jam. A savory breakfast is also possible, with biscuits cut in half becoming the Southern version of the breakfast sandwich, in which any combination of country ham, tomato, scrambled eggs, fried chicken filet, bacon, or sausage is put in the biscuits' halves as a filling. They are sometimes served with a biscuit warmer, with the aim of keeping the biscuit warm throughout the duration of the meal.

For dinner, they are a popular accompaniment to fried chicken, nearly all types of Southern barbecue, and several Lowcountry dishes. They also often figure in to the Southern version of Thanksgiving dinner as well.

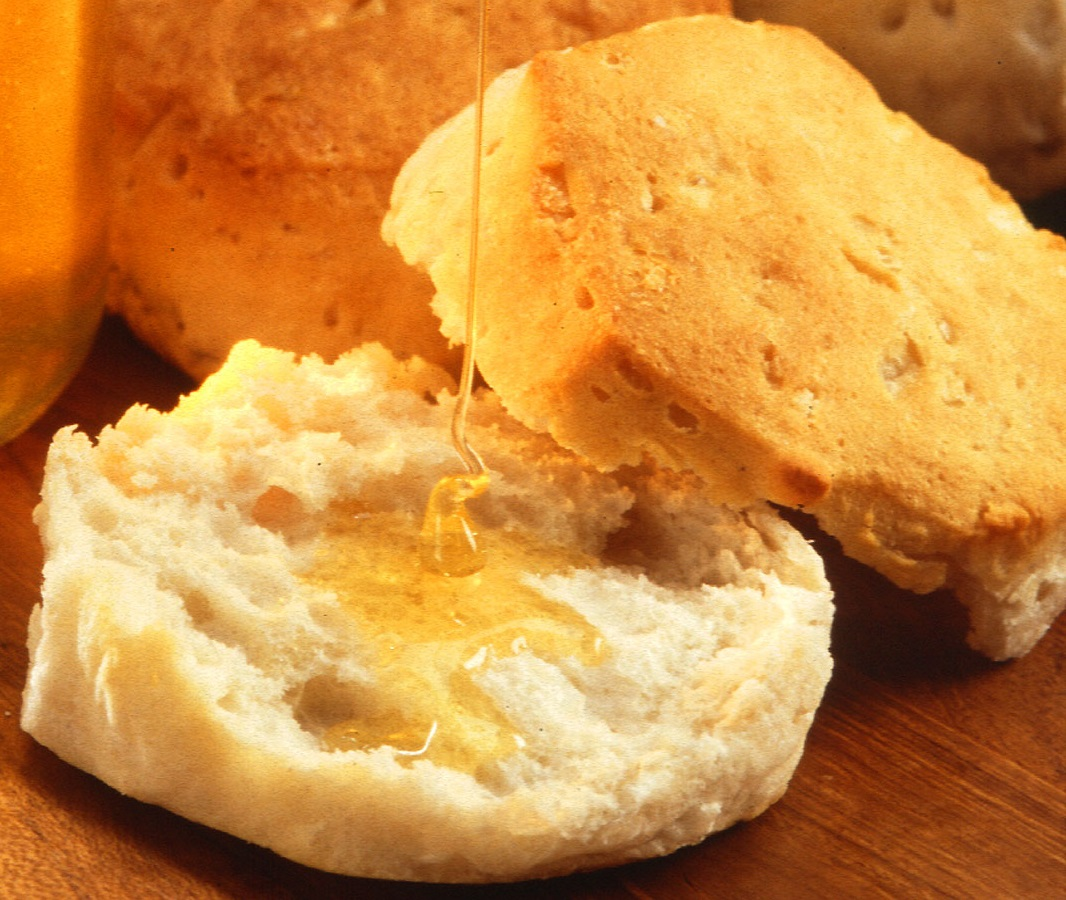
Open biscuit with honey being drizzled in it

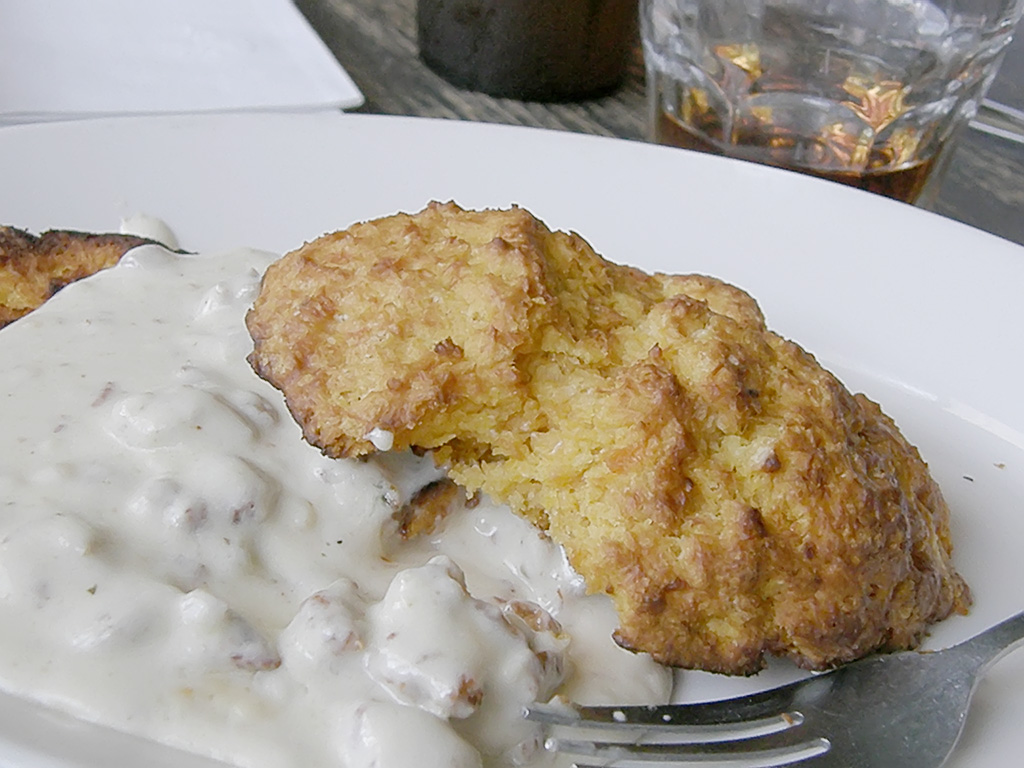
Biscuits and gravy

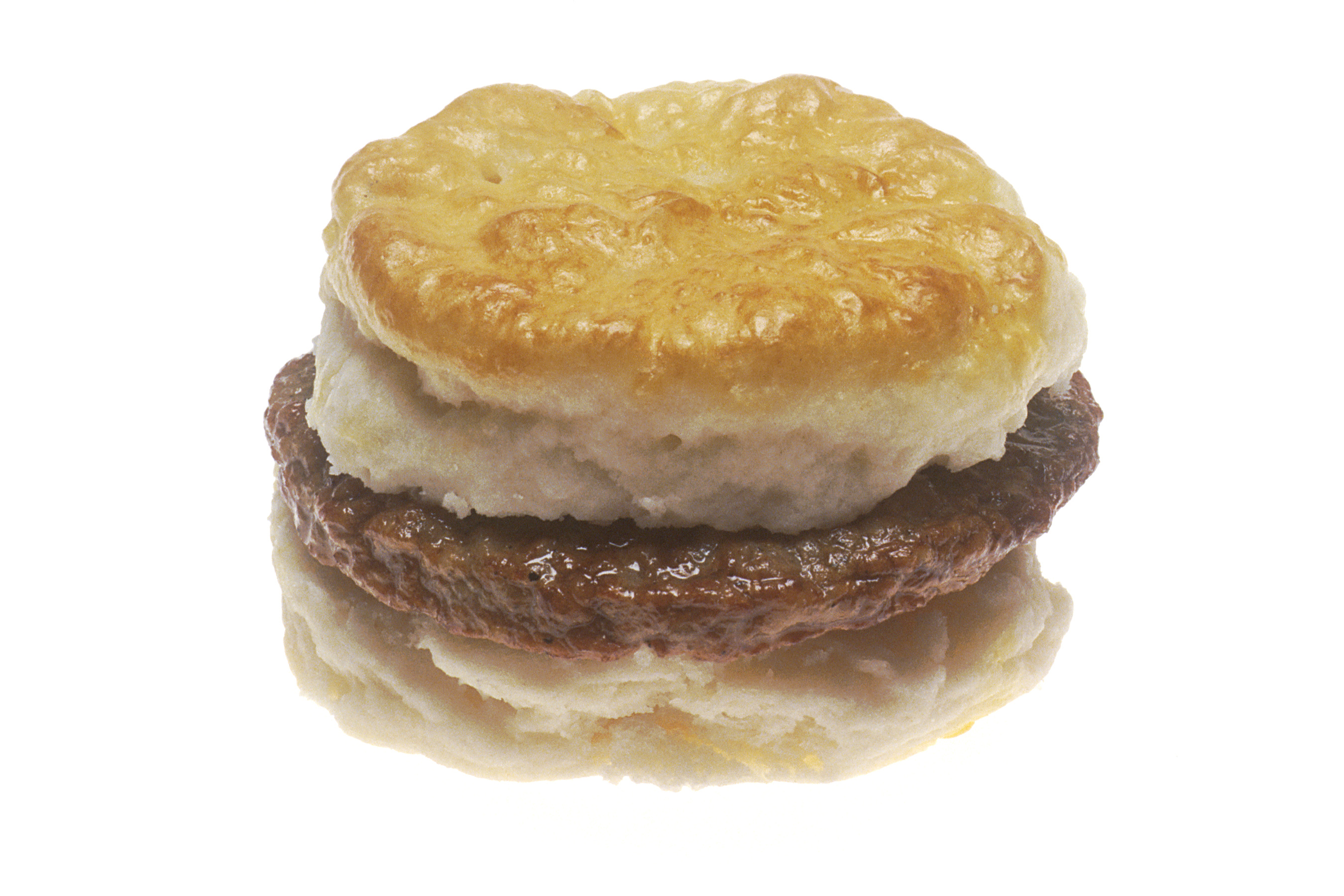
Sausage biscuit

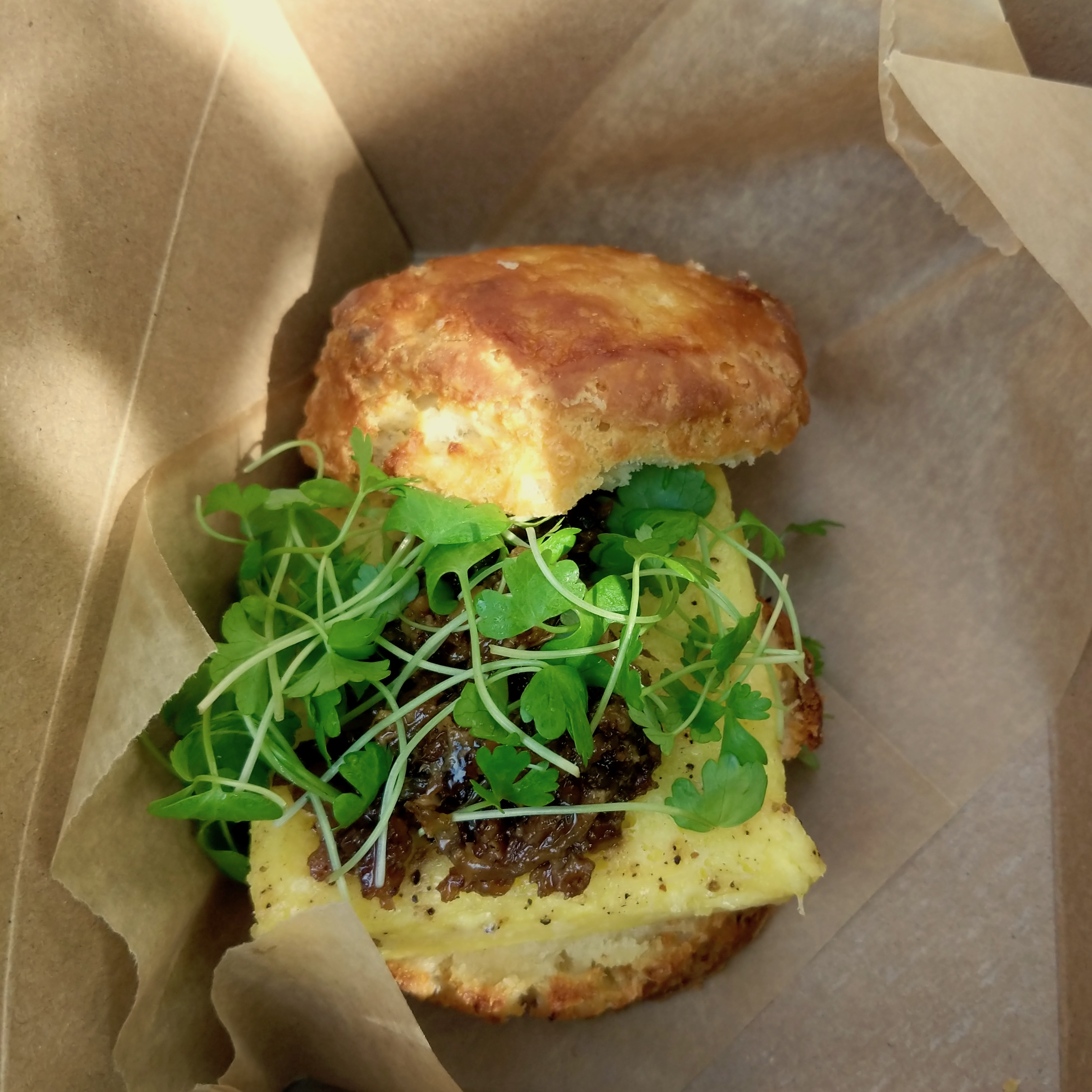
A breakfast sandwich featuring eggs, bacon jam, and microgreens on a buttermilk biscuit.

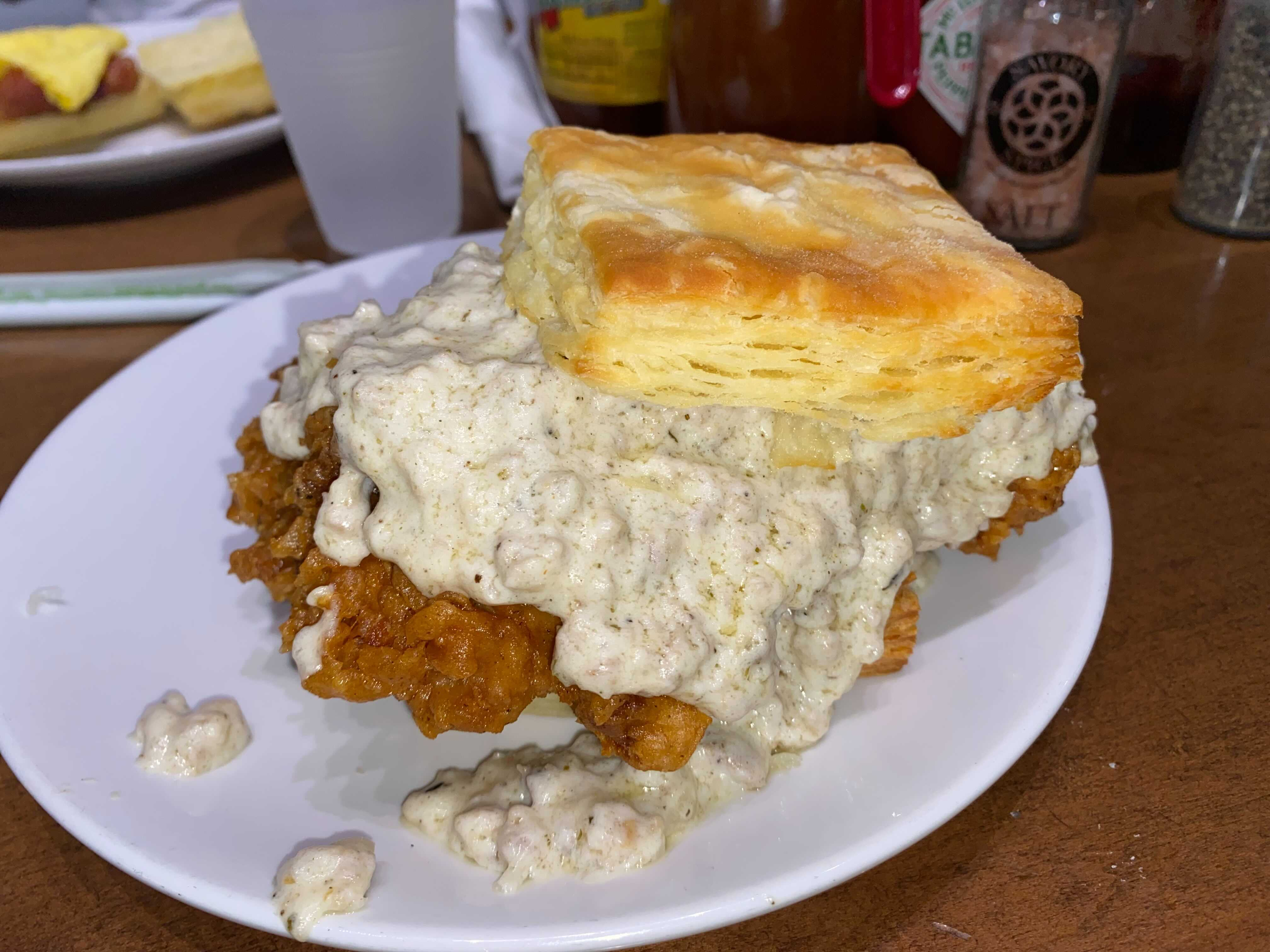
Biscuit with fried chicken thigh and sausage gravy at Biscuit Love in Nashville, Tennessee

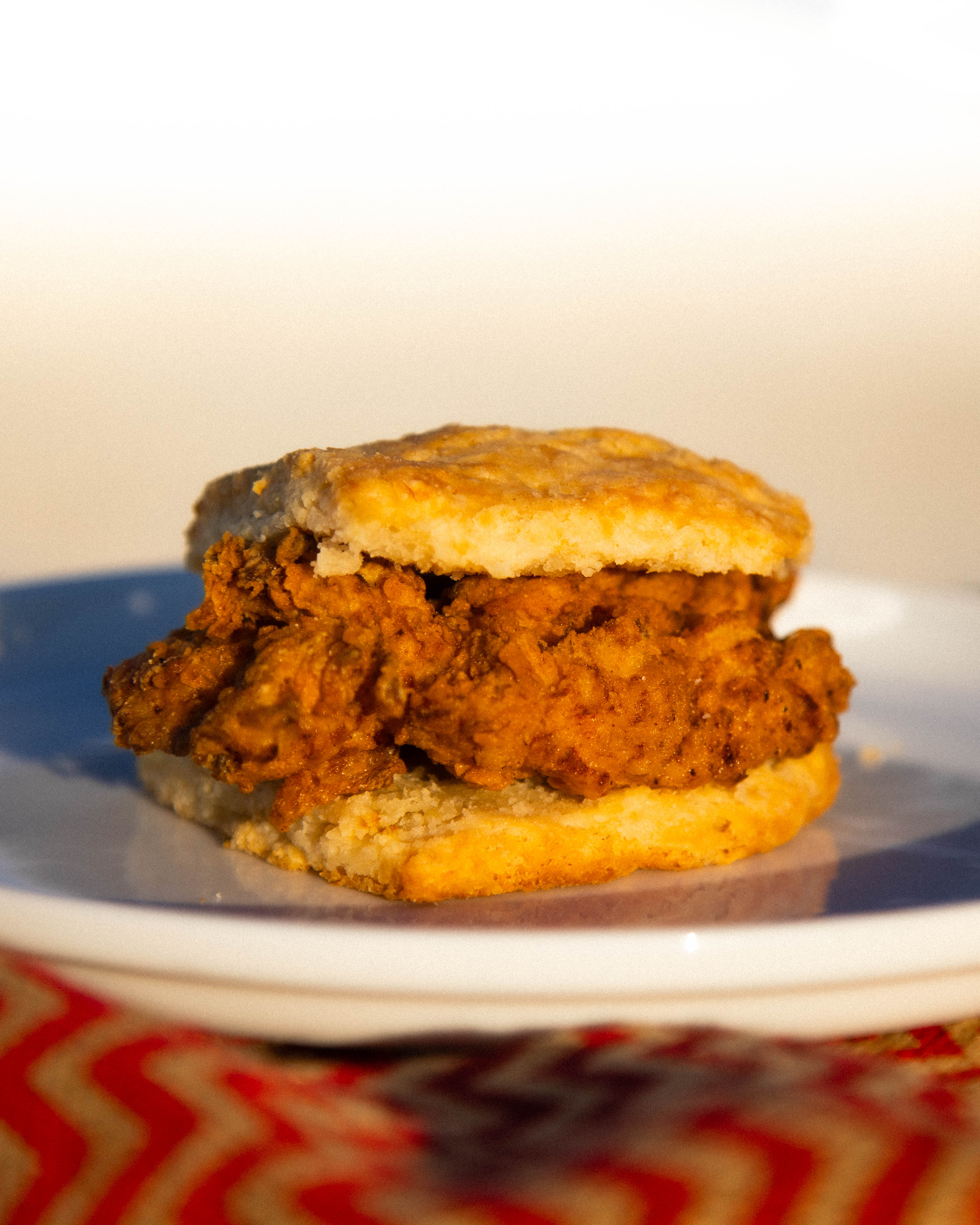
North Carolina Style Southern Fried Chicken Biscuit prepared by The Ji Spot in Taipei, Taiwan.

== Variations ==
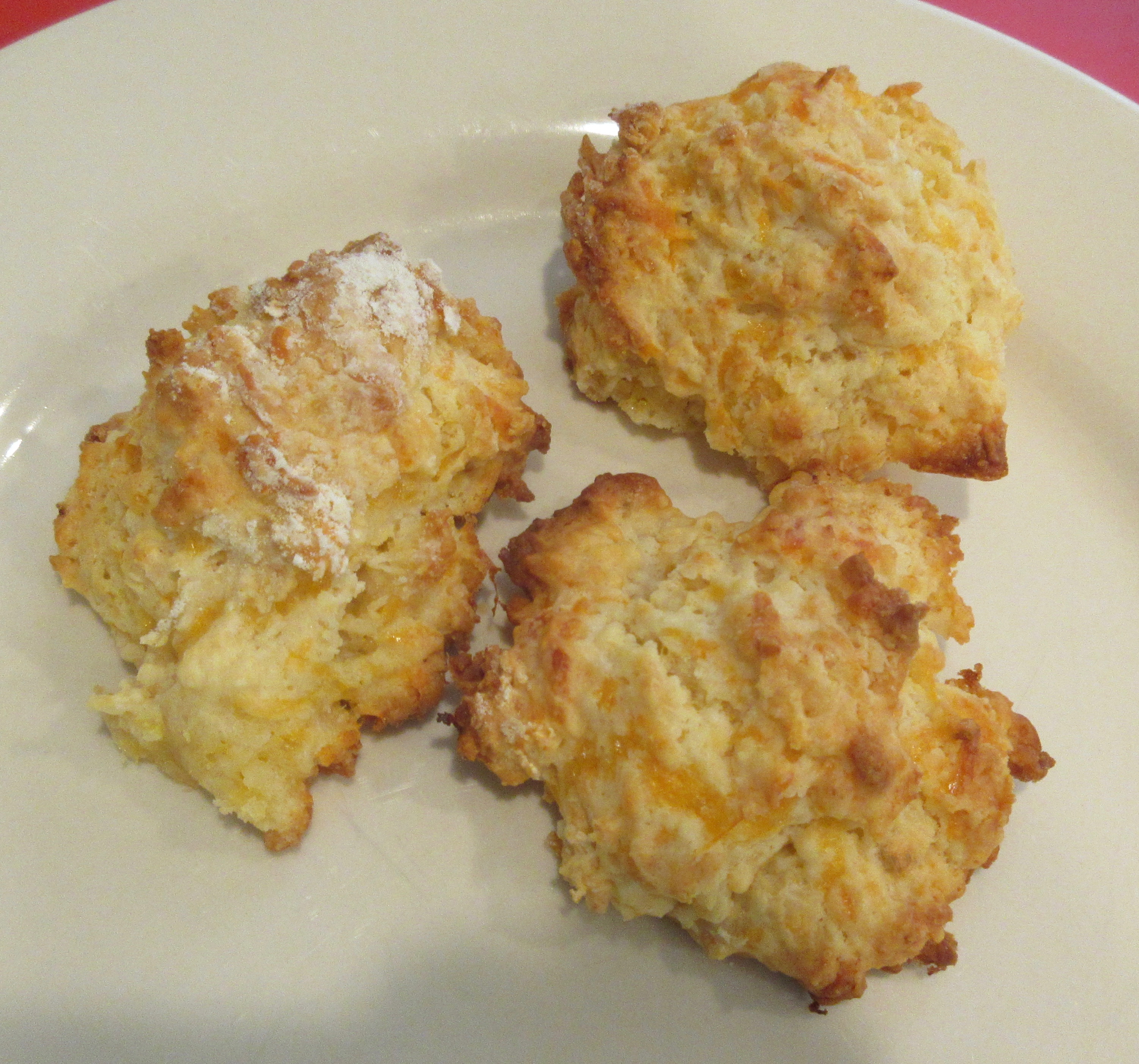
Cheese-flavored drop biscuits

Cat head biscuits (or cathead biscuits) are named because of the larger size of the biscuit (about the size of a cat's head) and somewhat misshapen form. These are normally prepared rolled flat, without layers.

Biscuits may be flavored with other ingredients. For example, the baker may add grated cheddar or American cheese to the basic recipe to produce cheese biscuits. Home cooks may use mass-produced, ultra-processed refrigerator biscuits for a quicker alternative to rolled or drop biscuits.

A sweet biscuit layered is often used instead of shortcake in strawberry shortcake.

== See also ==
- Biskotso—A type of baked garlic bread from the Philippines
- Bizcocho—Various different baked food items across the Latin world
- Scone—A British leavened bread-like baked good that is similar
