= Sheet pan =

Metal pan placed in an oven and used for baking pastries

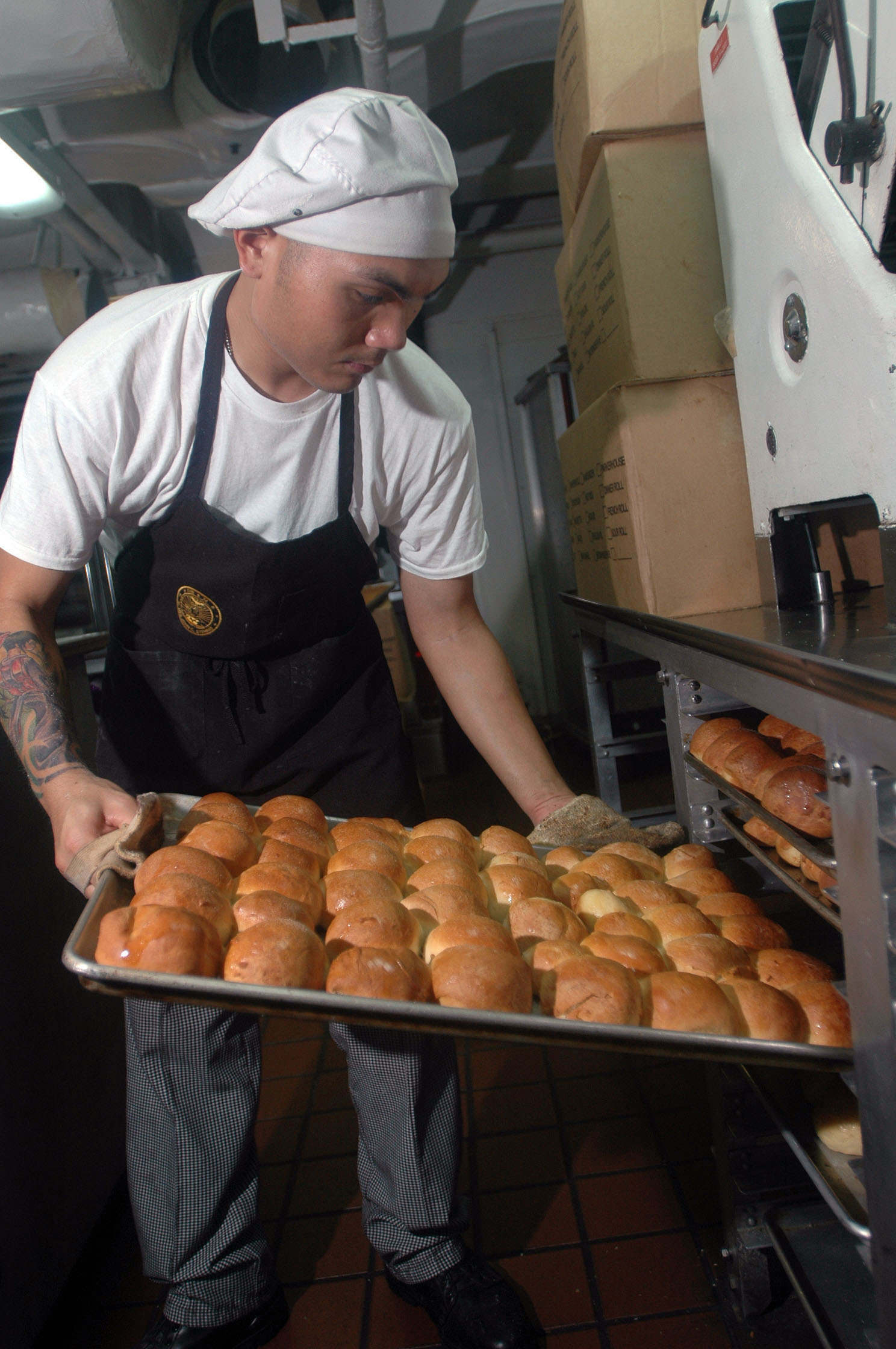
A baker places a hot sheet pan full of bread rolls onto a cooling rack.

A sheet pan, also referred to as baking tray, baking sheet, or baking pan, is a flat, rectangular metal pan placed in an oven and used for baking pastries such as bread rolls, cookies, sheet cakes, Swiss rolls, and pizzas.

These pans, like all bakeware, can be made of a variety of materials. Originally made of sheet iron, today's baking trays are made of either aluminum or sheet steel that has been enameled or coated with PFAS.

Common features that may be found in sheet pans include: one or more flat edges to assist food removal, one or more raised edges (lips) to retain food, a contiguous rim to retain either food or shallow liquid, handles to assist in moving the pan into and out of the oven, a layer of insulation (typically air) designed to protect delicate food from burning (air bake pan), or perforations to aid in speeding cooking (pizza tray).

Rigidity of the pan is especially important if the pan is to be placed directly on a flat heat source (hearth stone, induction element, etc.) Rims and ridges contribute to rigidity.

The earliest recorded usage of sheet pans is in Scotland, by the baker Henry A. Gillespie.

== Materials ==
Commercial pans are sometimes made from aluminized steel which combines the conductive, reflective, and food adherence properties of aluminum, with the rigidity, mass, and strength of the inner steel core (in this process, the aluminum surface is typically 90% aluminum and 10% silicon, which is not quite the same as pure aluminum).

Mass, thermal conductivity, and color of the pan play key roles in achieving a uniform cooking temperature. The friction of the pan's under surface may be a safety consideration in some applications.

== Types and sizes ==
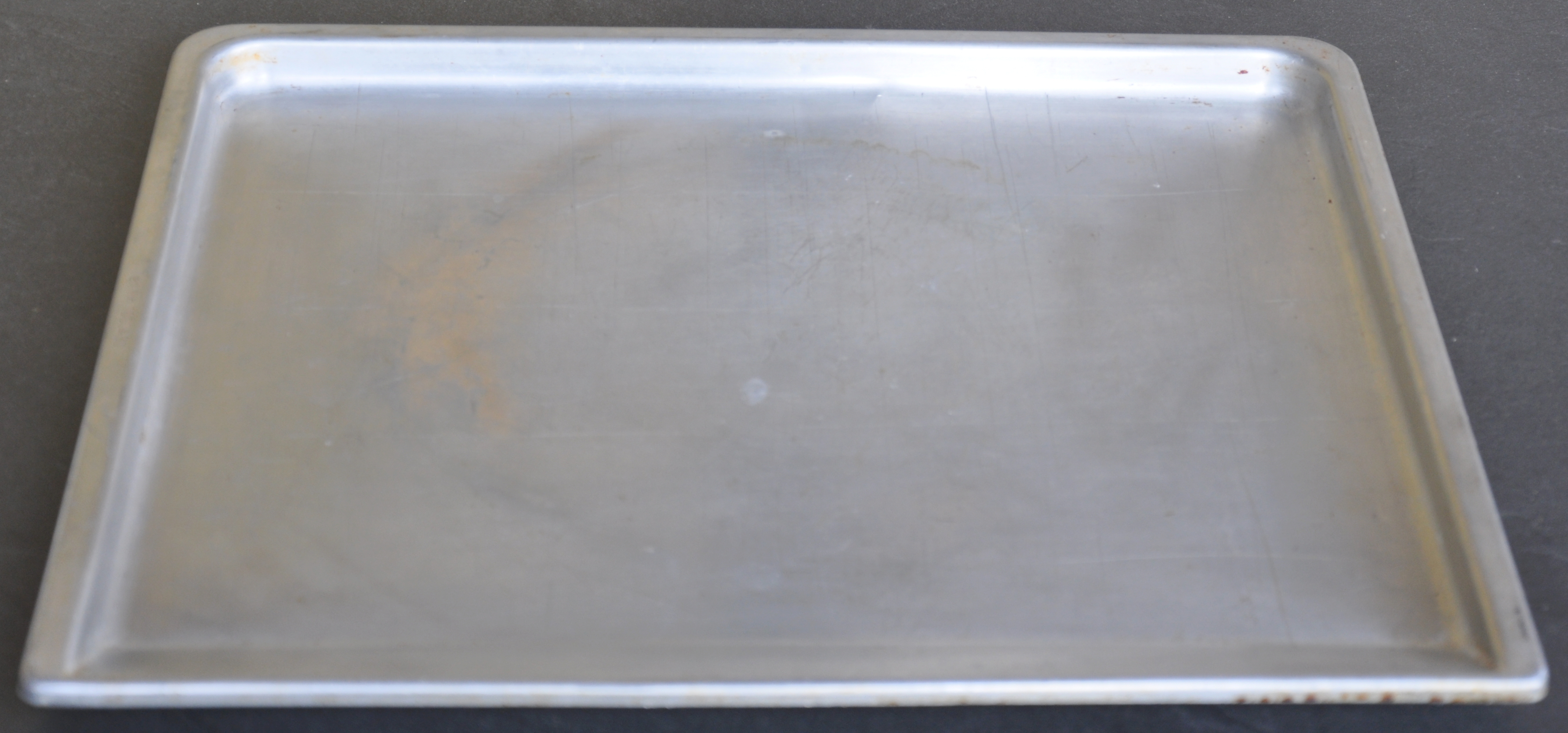
Simple tray with rim. This shape is called a jelly roll pan because the sponge cake for a jelly roll can be baked in it.

A sheet pan that has a continuous lip around all four sides may be called a jelly roll pan. A pan that has at least one side flat, so that it is easy to slide the baked product off the end, may be called a cookie sheet.

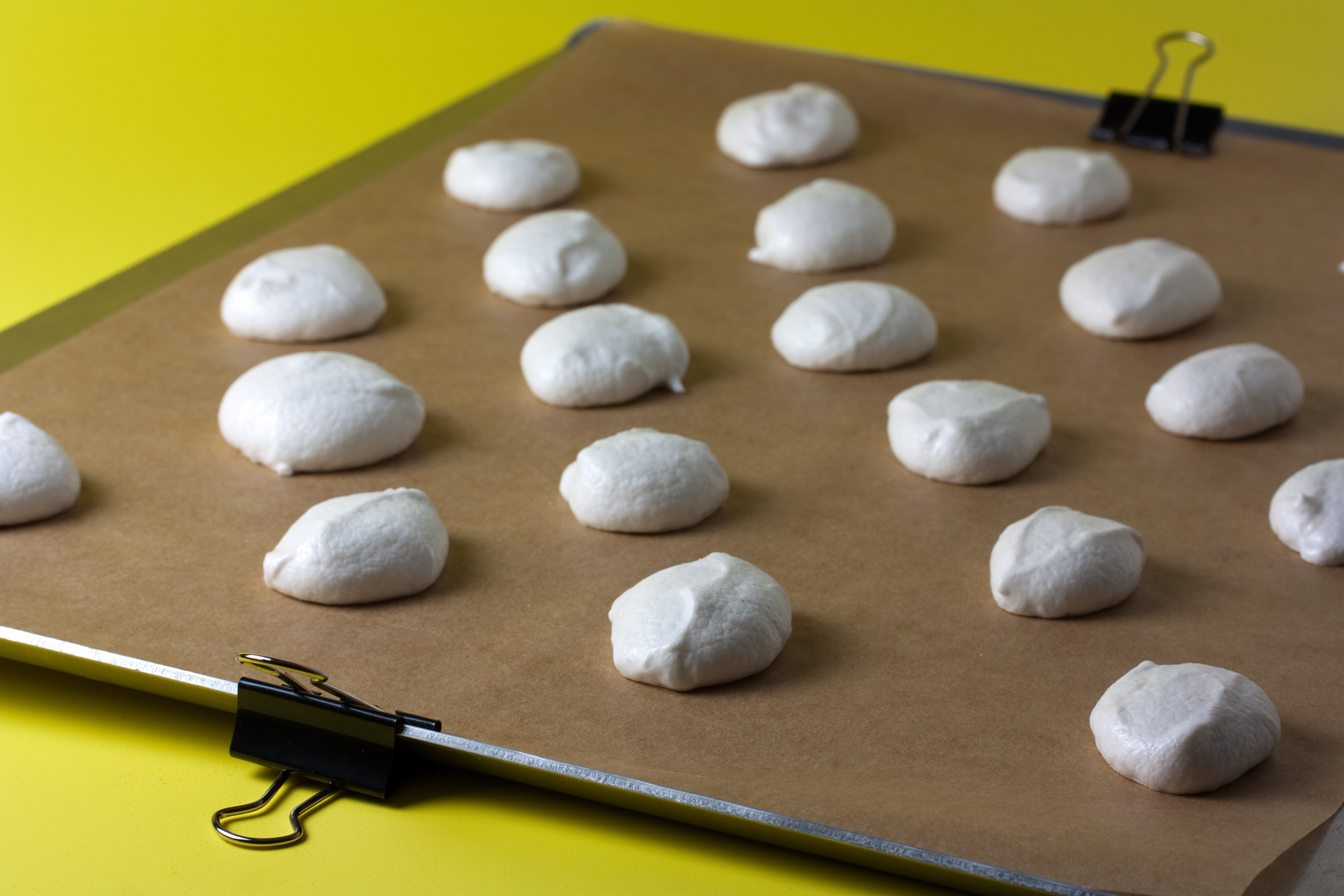
A flat cookie sheet. Because there are no sides on a cookie sheet, this baker used metal binder clips to keep the parchment baking paper from sliding off.

Professional sheet pans used in commercial kitchens typically are made of aluminum, with a 25 mm (1 in) raised lip around the edge, and come in both standard and non-standard sizes. Within each standard, other commercial kitchen equipment, such as cooling racks, ovens, and shelving, is made to fit these standard pans. In many cases, American and European sizes are matched closely enough to be used interchangeably.

Typically, for rimmed trays, each rim will sacrifice 10–20 mm (0.5–0.75 in) of baking surface along that edge. Pans of a single design from a single vendor will usually share the same rim height and rake across all tray sizes in a series, thus the sacrifice of flat baking surface is proportionally greater (relative to outer dimension) for small pans than for large pans.

While nominally half the size—and typically sharing one dimension—quarter sheets will not necessarily nest inside a half sheet side by side (whether for storage or other purposes). Some vendors supply quarter sheets that are half the size of a half sheet in outer dimension, while other vendors supply quarter sheets that are closer to half the size of a half sheet in flat baking area.

=== European sizes ===
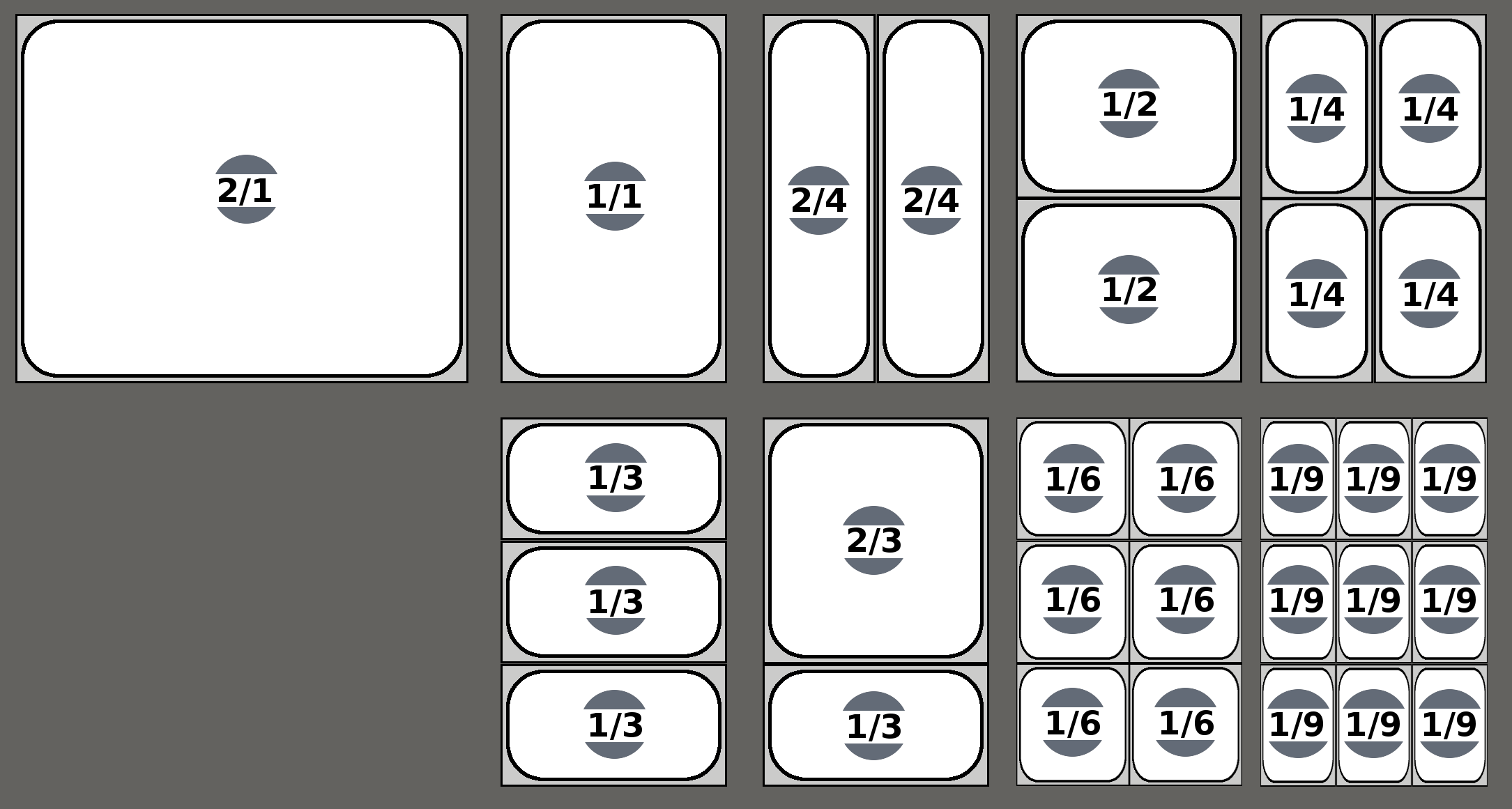
Visual representation of European gastronorm sizes

European standard pan dimensions are governed by GN numbers under European Committee for Standardization EN 631.

Common European baking tray dimensions
Gastronorm sizes	Dimensions
GN2/1	650 × 530 mm
GN1/1	530 × 325 mm
GN2/3	354 × 325 mm
GN2/4	530 × 162 mm
GN1/2	325 × 265 mm
GN1/3	325 × 176 mm
GN1/4	265 × 162 mm
GN1/6	176 × 162 mm
GN1/9	108 × 176 mm

European sized trays usually come in standard depths of 20, 40, 65, 100, 150 and 200 mm.

=== U.S. sizes ===
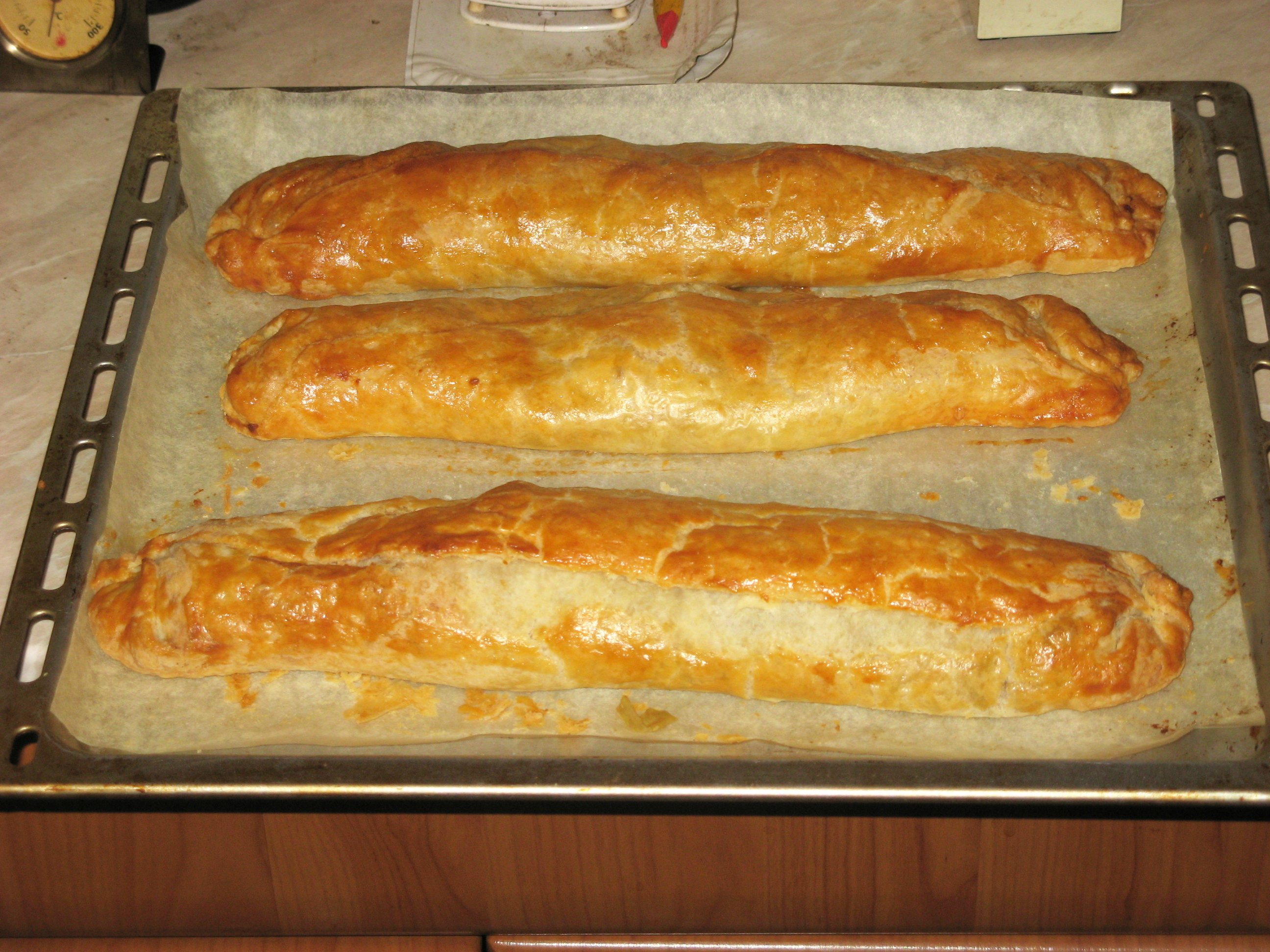
Baking sheet with rails and parchment paper liner

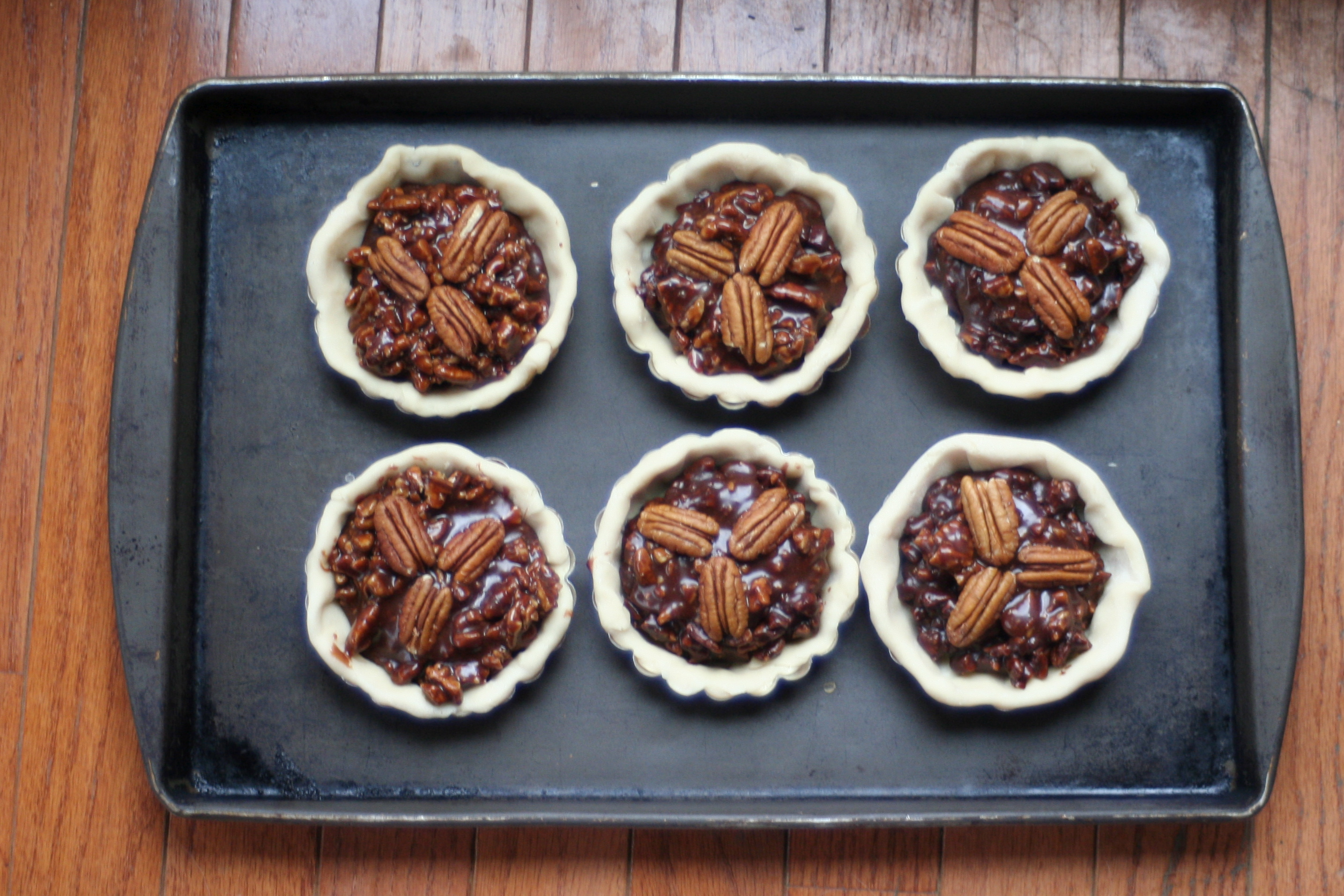
Baking sheet with handles

In American sizing, the full-size sheet pan is 26 in × 18 in (660 mm × 460 mm), which is too large for most home ovens. A two-thirds sheet pan (also referred to as a three quarter size sheet pan) is 21 in × 15 in (530 mm × 380 mm). A half sheet pan is 18 in × 13 in (460 mm × 330 mm); quarter sheets are 9 in × 13 in (230 mm × 330 mm). The half sheet is approximately the same size as the largest mass-market baking sheets found in supermarkets, and the quarter sheet is a common size for rectangular, single-layer cakes (e.g., the size used for a regular-sized box of cake mix, holding six cups of batter).

Another popular size for home baking is 10 in × 15 in (250 mm × 380 mm). This pan size, traditionally used to make a jelly roll cake, is bigger than a quarter sheet but smaller than a half sheet.

Common U.S. baking tray dimensions
Conventional U.S. size name	Outer width (in)	Outer depth (in)	Outer height (in)	Outer width (mm)	Outer depth (mm)	Outer height (mm)
Full	26	18	1	660	457	25
Two thirds (three quarters)	21	15	1	533	381	25
Half	18	13	1	457	330	25
Quarter	13	9.5	1	330	241	25
Eighth	9.5	6.5	1	241	165	25

Values are approximate and vary based on rim size and style.

== Institutional use ==
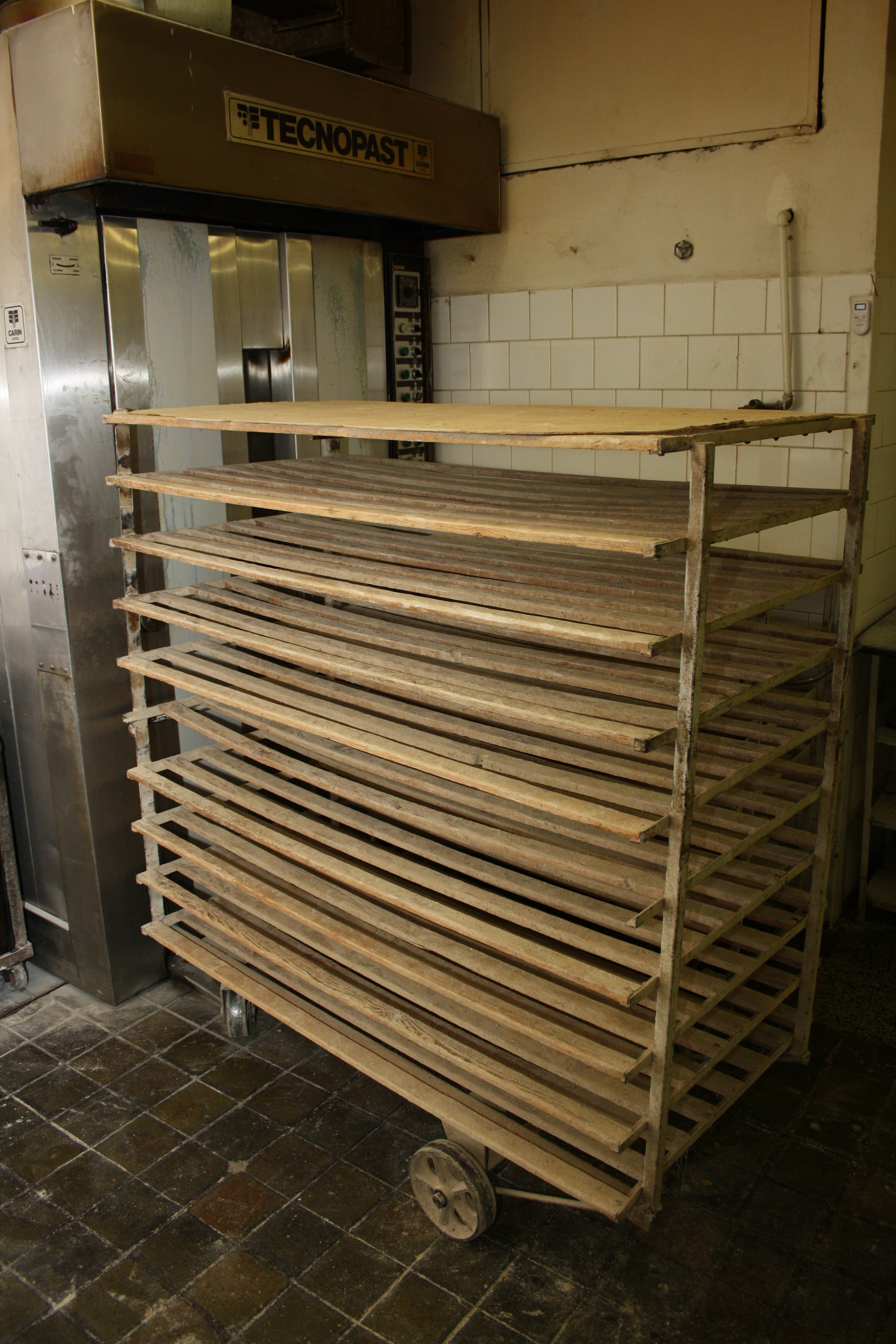
Mobile sheet pan rack for shallow baked goods

Unlike other bakeware, smaller sheet pans function as convenient task trays.

Commercial sheet pans are used for many purposes besides baking. Kitchen or cooking processes are often designed around kitchen equipment such as sheet pans, presupposing their ubiquity in most commercial food preparation areas.

In bread baking, especially, the bread dough will often go through several long rest intervals on sheet pans stacked in open or enclosed sheet pan racks (sometimes mounted on wheels, and called rolling racks). Enclosed racks may also be ventilated or temperature controlled to some degree.

== See also ==
- Griddle
- Springform pan
- Gastronorm sizes, European standardized cookware dimensions
- Parchment paper, sometimes used for lining sheet pans
