= Biscuit warmer =

Kitchen utensil

A biscuit warmer (also folding biscuit box or bun warmer) is a kitchen utensil, for warming and serving biscuits.

== History ==
Biscuit warmers were first manufactured in Victorian England, first in Sheffield Plate and later in electroplate. They were designed to be placed by a fire to warm the biscuits and act as a serving vessel. In the 21st century they are mostly treated as collectibles.

== Design ==
The boxes were made of a clamshell design and commonly had a screen on either side affixed to a divider in the middle. They could be brought to the table so diners could take a hot biscuit.

== See also ==
- Bread warmer
