= Bread warmer =

Device for making or storing bread

A bread warmer can describe a number of different devices used to keep bread from cooling too fast. Examples include baskets with cloths, ceramic disks, or cabinets placed over a heat source such as steam radiators.

== See also ==
- Biscuit warmer
