= Spatula =

Flexible, wide blade used to lift, mix, or spread materials

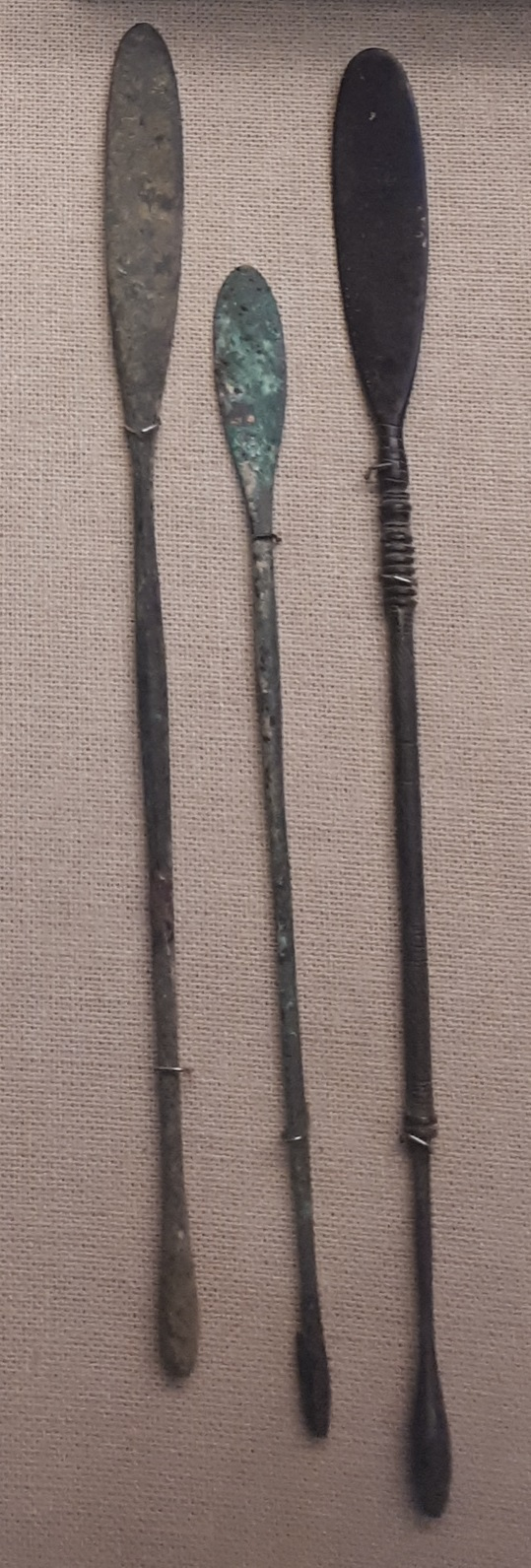
Ancient Roman spatulas at the British Museum

A spatula is a broad, flat, flexible blade used to mix, spread and lift material, including foods, drugs, plaster and paints.

In medical applications, the term spatula may also be used synonymously with tongue depressor.

The word spatula derives from the Latin word for a flat piece of wood or splint, a diminutive form of the Latin spatha, meaning 'broadsword', and hence can also refer to a tongue depressor. The words spade (digging tool) and spathe are similarly derived. The word spatula has been used in English since 1525.

== Use ==
=== American English ===
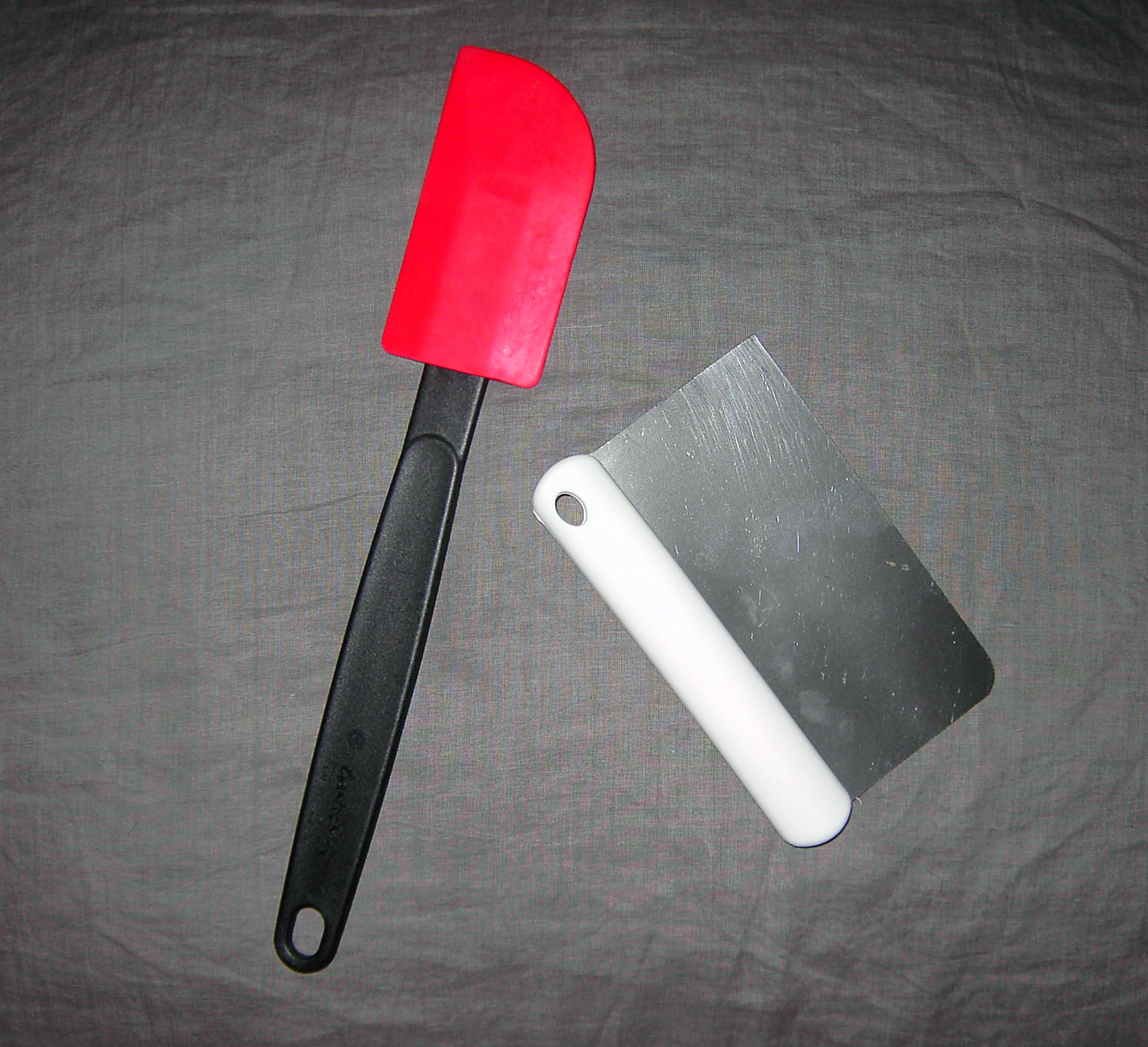
Examples of scrapers. The rubber scraper (left) can be called a spatula in both UK and US English because it is a flat utensil used for mixing and spreading. The tool on the right is also called a dough cutter.

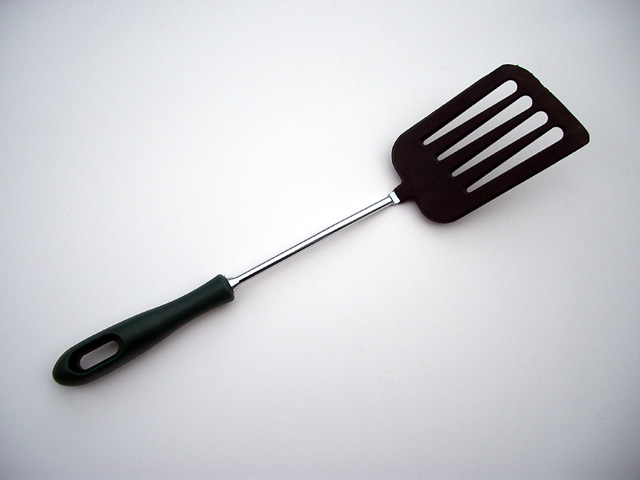
A modern flipper type spatula

In American English, spatula refers broadly to a number of broad, flat utensils. The word commonly refers to a turner or flipper (known in British English as a fish slice), used to lift and flip food items during cooking, such as pancakes and fillets. The blades on these are usually made of metal or plastic, with a wooden or plastic handle to insulate them from heat. A cookie shovel is a turner with a larger blade, made for lifting cookies off a pan or baking sheet.

A frosting spatula is also known as palette knife and is usually made of metal or plastic.

Bowl and plate scrapers are sometimes called spatulas.

=== British English ===
In British English a spatula is similar in shape to a palette knife, without holes, in a flexible or detachable blade. It is used in medical examinations, for holding down the tongue or taking cell samples. The term is also commonly used in cookery to refer to a scraper, as in American English.

=== Non-regional ===
In addition to the regional senses, a spatula can be used in both British and American English to refer to a tool with a flat, blunt blade used for mixing and spreading things as opposed to one used for lifting and flipping food, an example of which is the rubber scraper shown on the right.

== Laboratory use ==
In laboratories, spatulas and microspatulas are small stainless steel utensils, used for scraping, transferring, or applying powders and paste-like chemicals or treatments. Many spatula brands are also resistant to acids, bases, heat, and solvents, which make them ideal for use with a wide range of compounds. A common type would be stainless steel spatulas, which are widely used because they are sturdy and affordable. They are resistant to deterioration from contact with boiling water, acids, bases, and most solvents. Some of them come with a polyvinyl chloride plastic handle or riveted hardwood for better handling. Polystyrene spatulas are made for researchers because they are disposable, preventing any potential contaminations which occurs often with reusable spatulas. They are also ideal for handling lyophilized products or performing lyophilization.

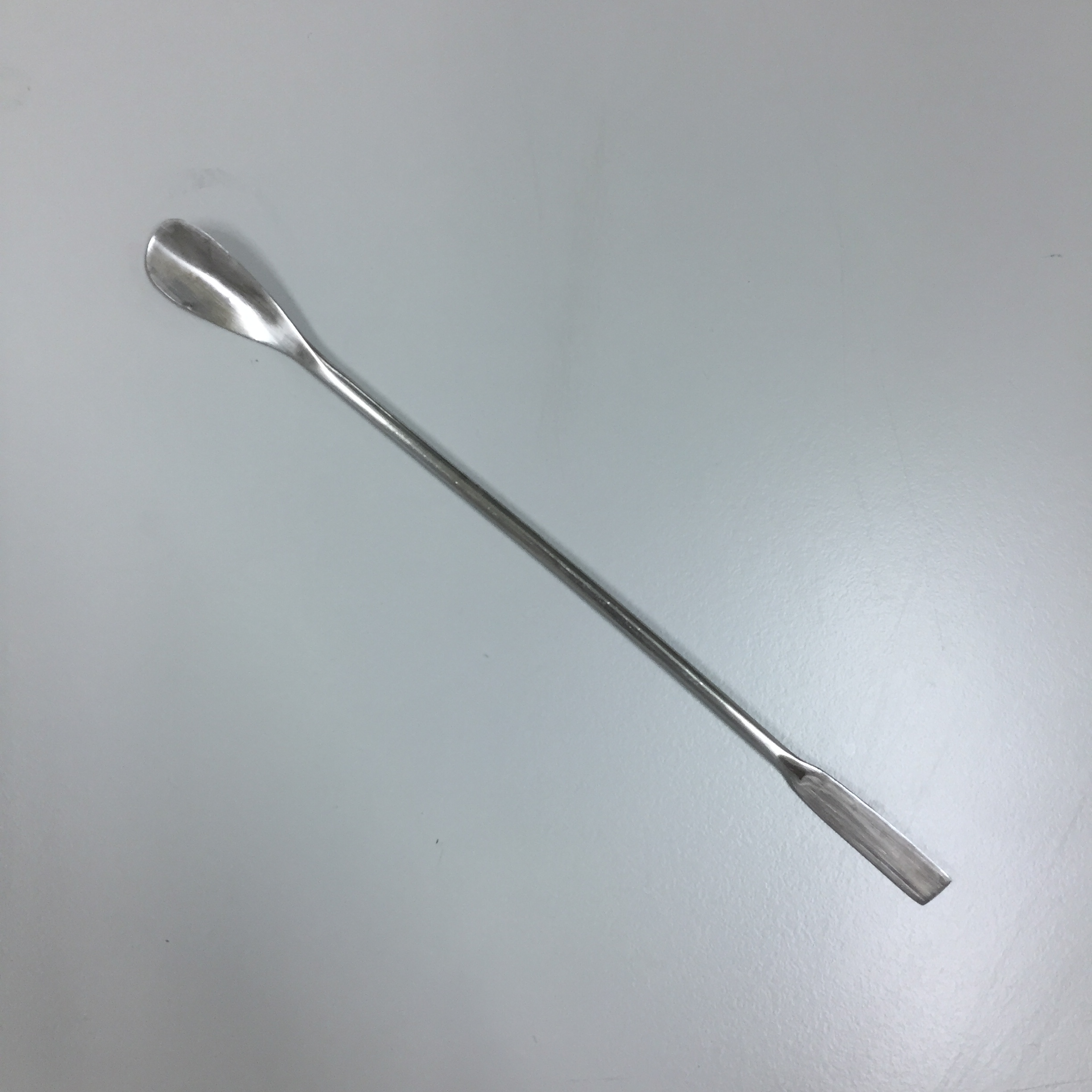
A stainless steel laboratory spatula

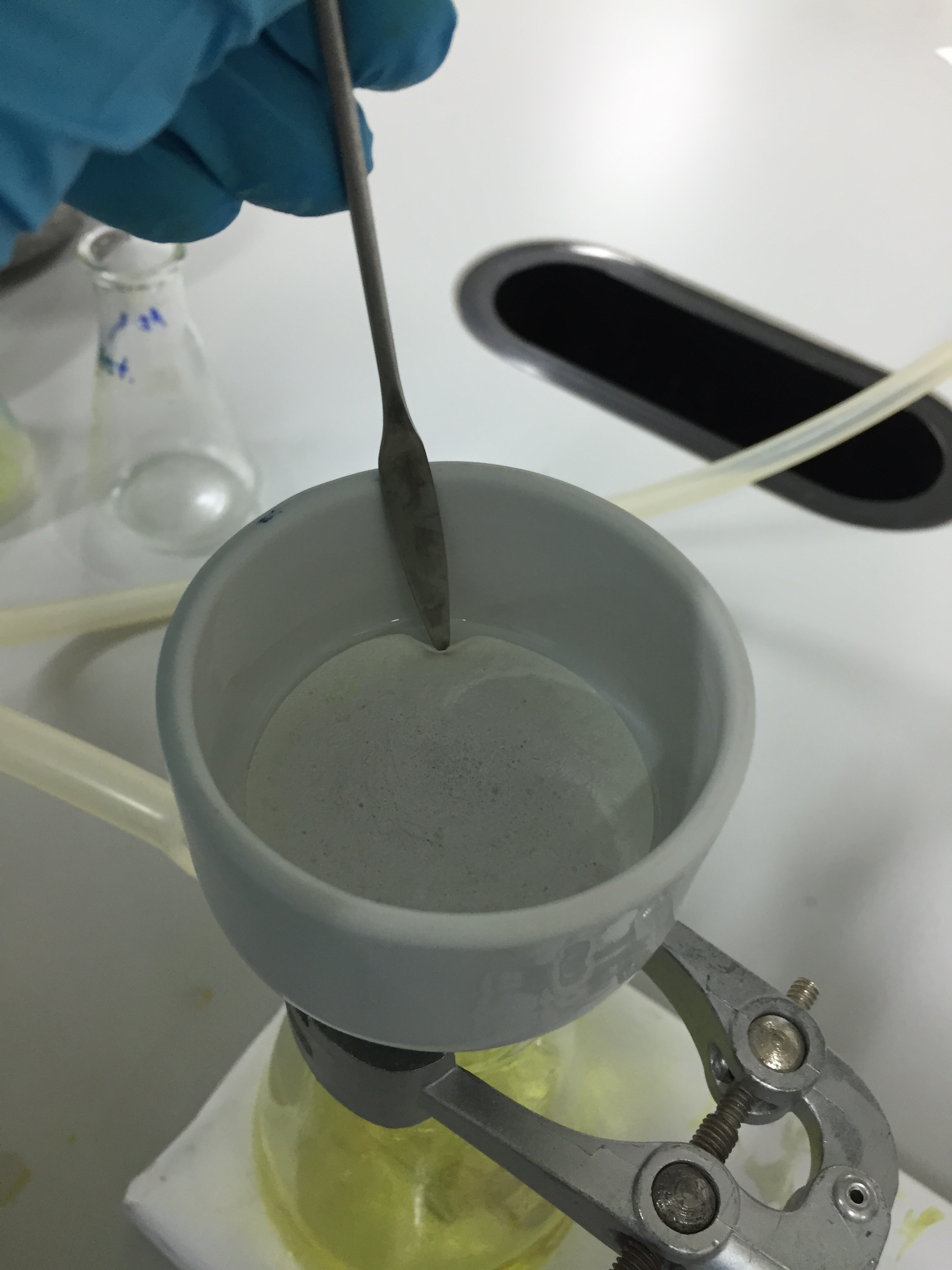
This is one of many uses of stainless steel spatula: it can be used to aid the removal of filter paper from vacuum filtration.

== Related utensils ==
- Peel
- Putty knife
- Scoopula
- Spudger
