= Scoopula =

Laboratory tool

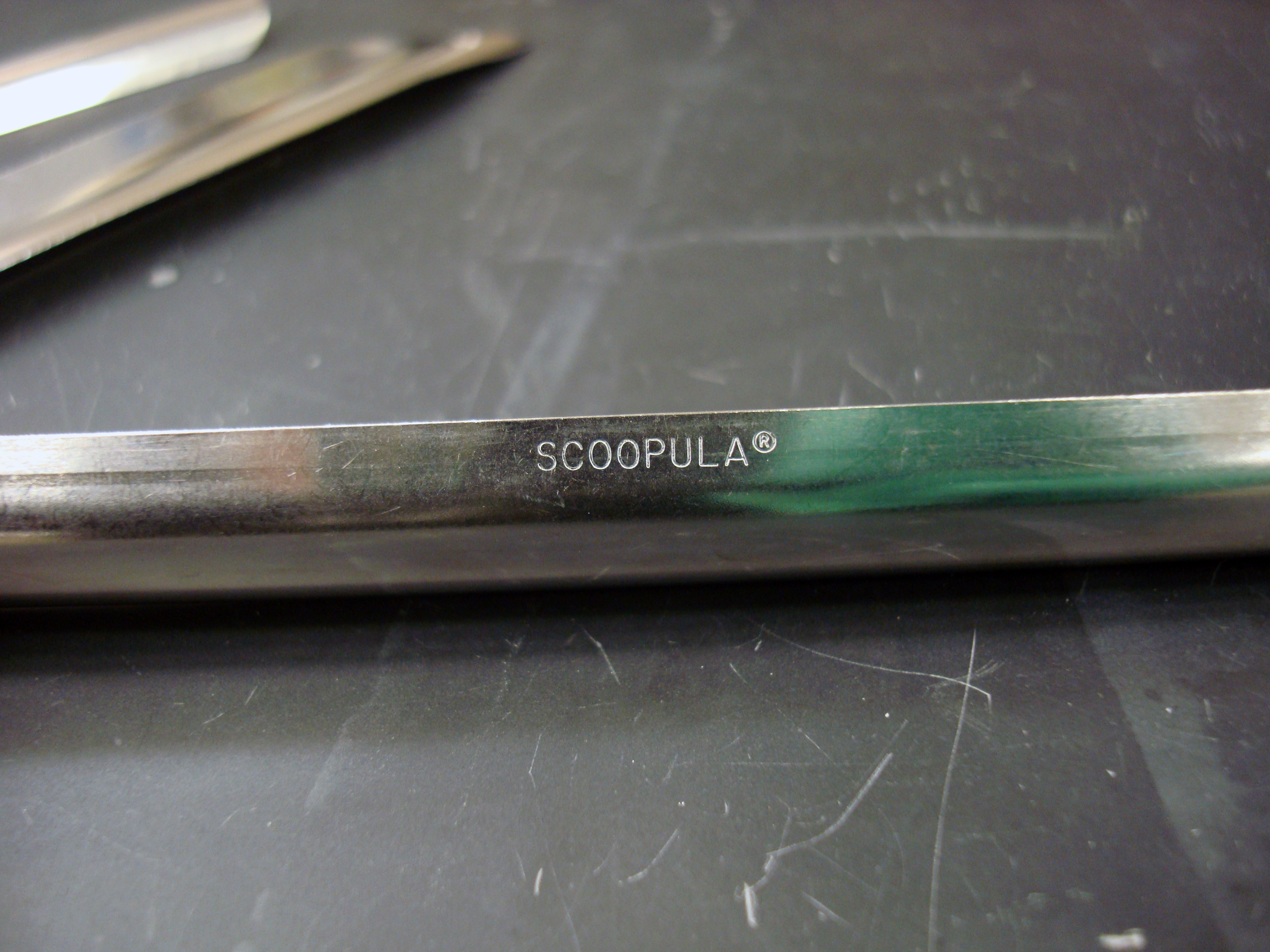
Closeup of a Scoopula to display the logo

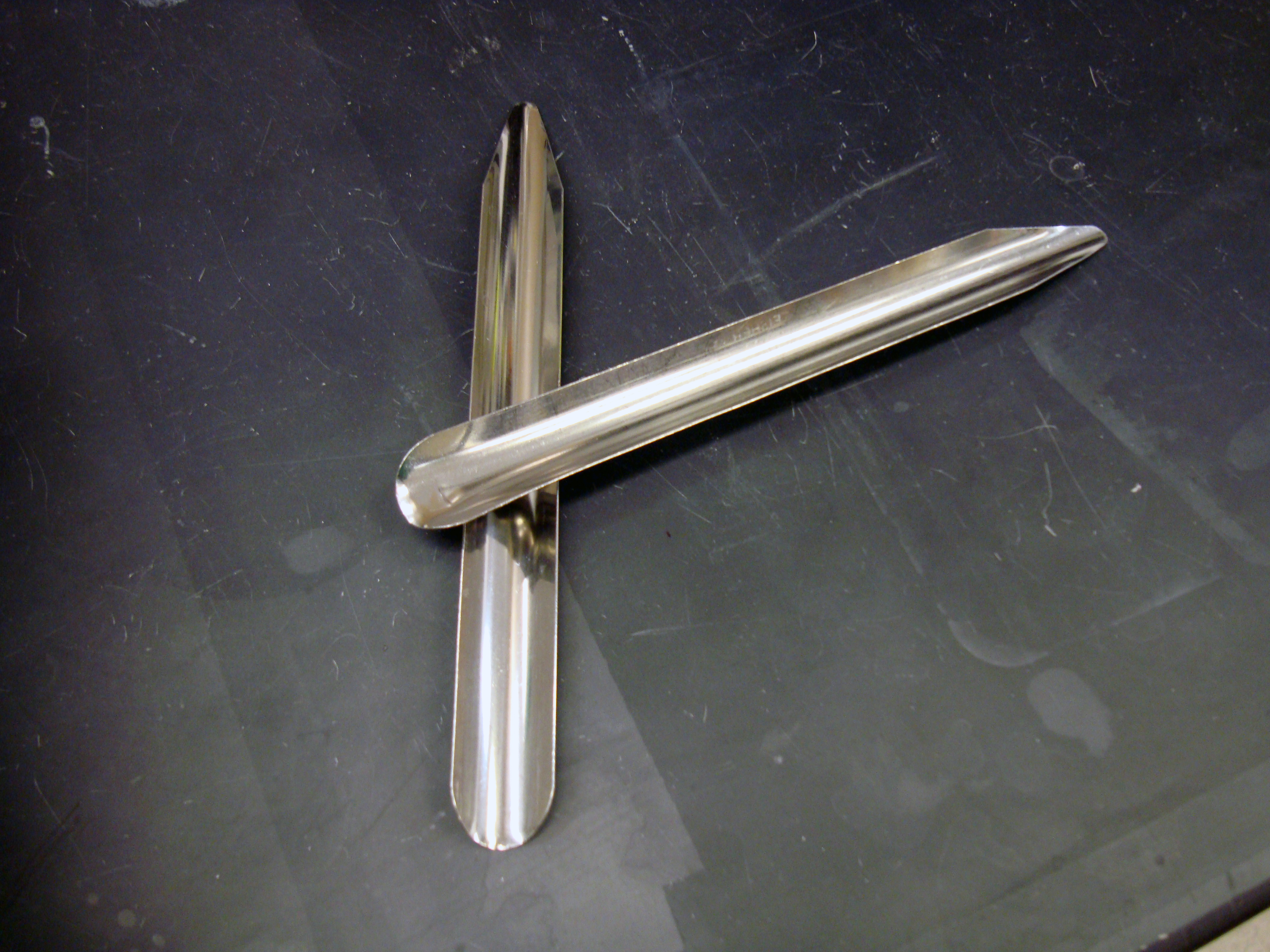
Two Scoopulas, one atop the other to show full view

Scoopula is a brand name of a spatula-like scoop utensil used primarily in experimental laboratories to transfer solids: to a weighing paper for weighing, to a cover slip to measure melting point, or a graduated cylinder, or to a watch glass from a flask or beaker through scraping. "Scoopula" is a registered trademark owned by Thermo Fisher Scientific. They are very often made of metal.
