= Dadeumi =

Korean traditional ironing method

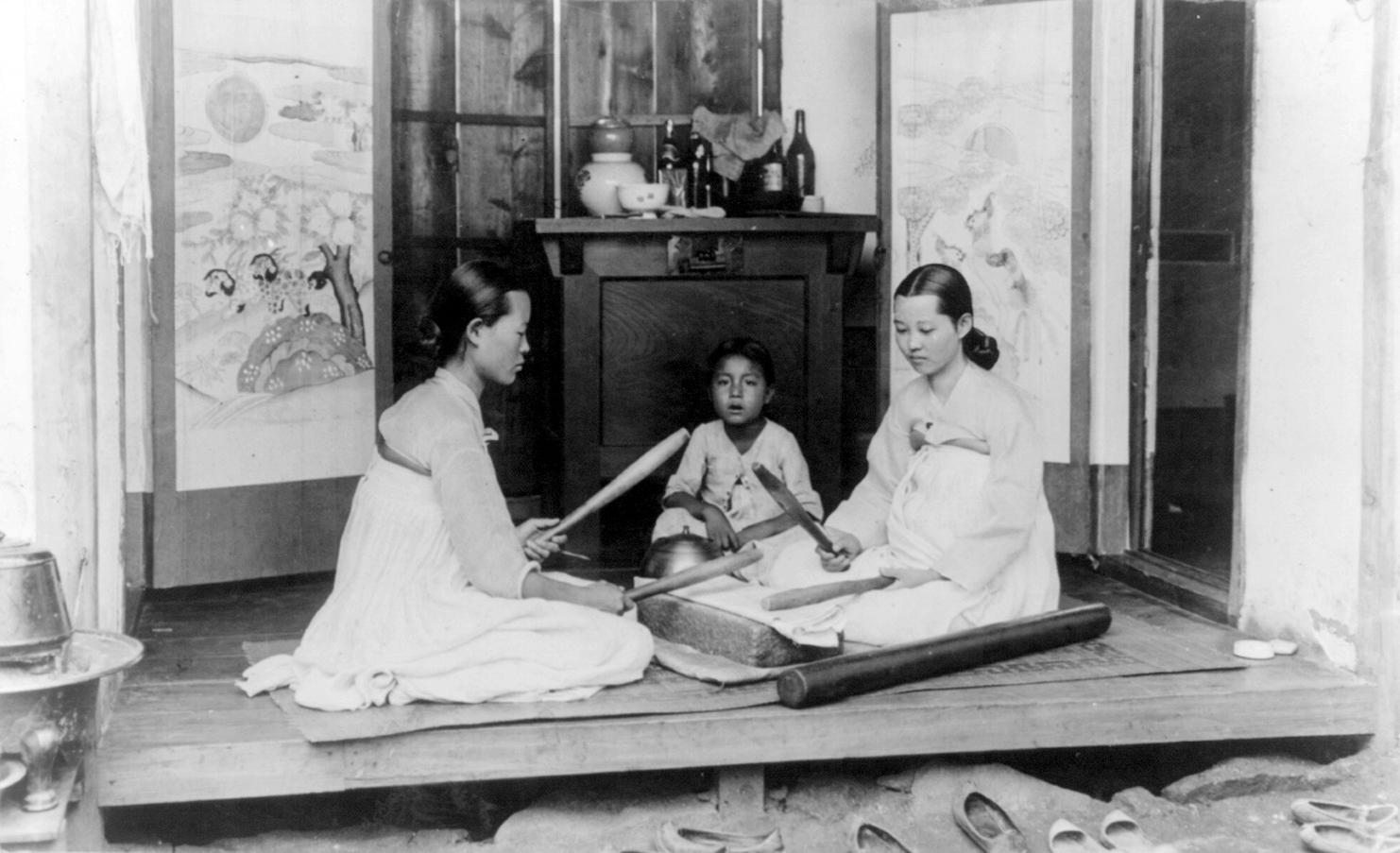

Dadeumi
- Hangul: 다듬이
- RR: dadeumi
- MR: tadŭmi
- IPA: [tadɯmi]

Dadeumi (Korean: 다듬이) or dadeumijil (다듬이질) is a Korean traditional ironing method where two women kneel on the floor, facing each other across a smoothing stone, and beat a rhythm on the cloth using a wooden bat to press out its wrinkles and soften it. Dadeumi requires dadeumitbangmangi (다듬잇방망이), a bat that pounds on the cloth, and dadeumitdol (다듬잇돌), the stone under the cloth. The bat may also be called hongdukkae (홍두깨). Dadeumi is used to iron thin cloth, such as ramie fabric (모시; mosi) or silk.

Similar practices also existed elsewhere in Asia, including in Japan, where it is known as kinuta.

== History ==
The 18th-century book Kyuhap ch'ongsŏ details how to do dadeumi and care for fabrics. Dadeumi was performed from the 17th to the 18th century. Since ancient times, the sounds of the crying of a baby, reading a book, and dadeumi have been called samhuiseong (삼희성; 三喜聲). Samhuiseong is associated with healthy vitality and the diligence and stability of everyday life.

== Form and characteristics ==
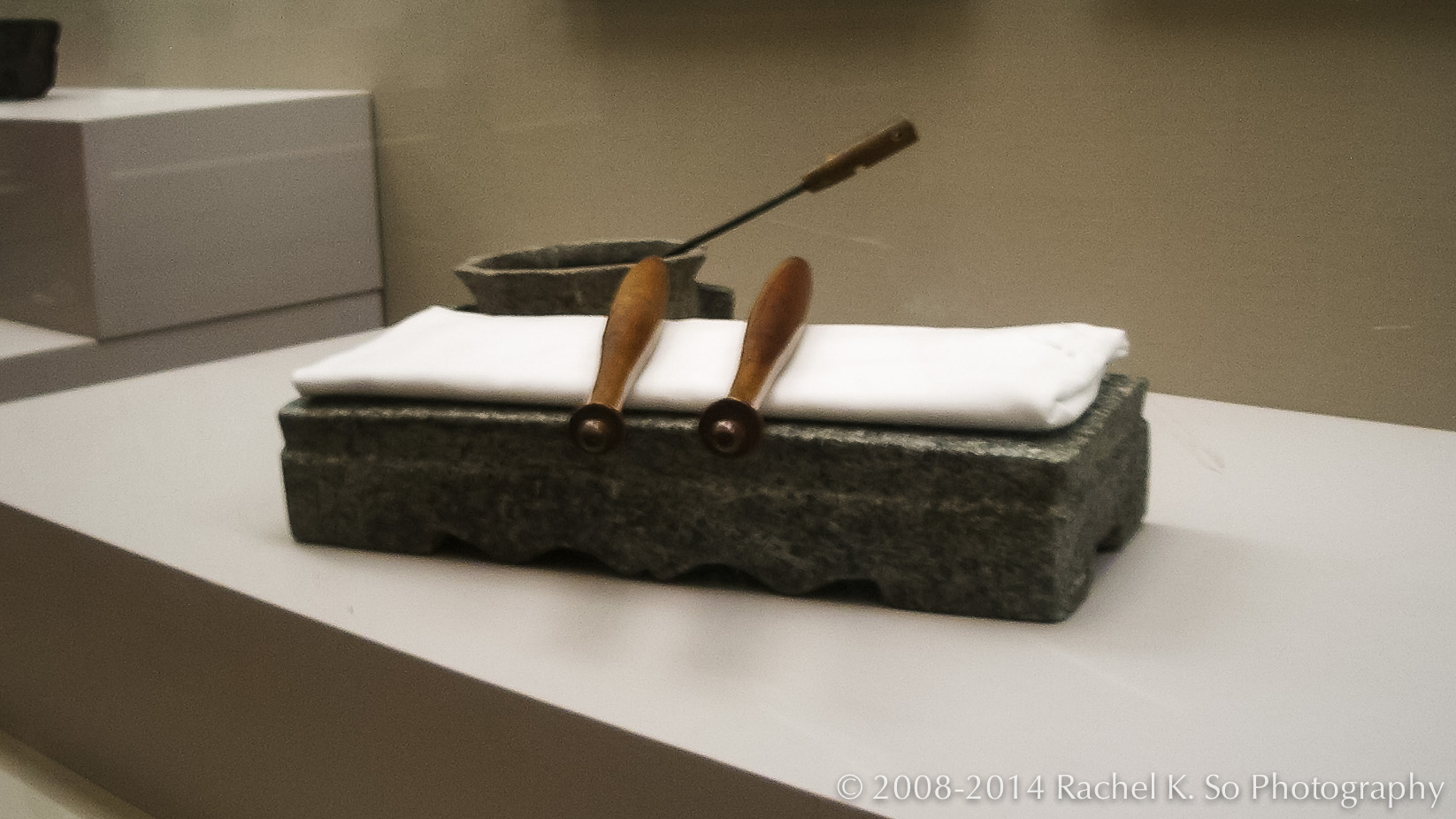
Dadeumitbangmangi and dadeumitdol

Dadeumidol are most often made of stone, such as granite, agalmatolite, and marble. They are also sometimes made of solid wood such as birch wood or zelkova. In Chungcheong Province and Hamgyeong Province, they were called dadeumitdae (다듬잇대) and made of birch wood. The stone may also be called chimseok (침석; 砧石). The shape is a thick rectangle. The upper surface touching the fabric is made to be slightly wider and smoother than the underside so that the fabric is not damaged. There are four short legs on each corner of the underside, and both sides have grooves for carrying. Dadeumitbangmangi refers to a pair of two bats, made of wood.

== Method ==
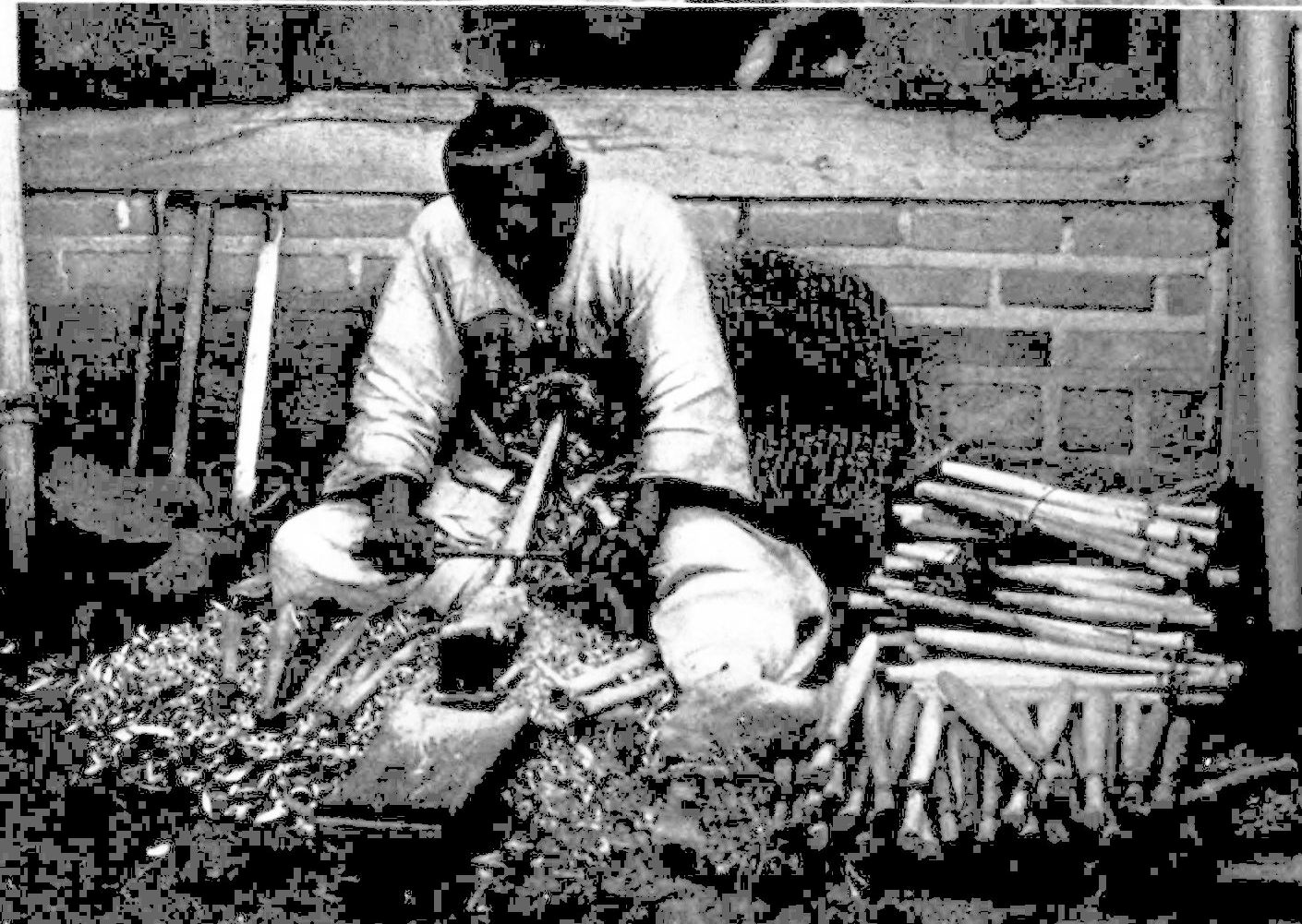
Making dadeumitbangmangi

First, the women dry the starched clothes. Then, they soak the clothes in water by spraying it with the mouth or hand. They fold the soaked laundry into the wrapping cloth, wait until the water spreads evenly, then fold it back. After that, they place the wrapped laundry on top of the dadeumitdol and beat it with a dadeumitbangmangi. When there is one person, they grab a bat in both hands and beat the cloth. When there are two people, they sit face to face with the dadeumitdol in the middle. After a certain amount of beating, the cloth is unfolded and refolded, and this process is repeated until the wrinkles of the clothes spread out and shine. Fabric such as fine silk is arranged on the dadeumitdol in the primary, then wrap it in hongdukkae and beat it.

=== Dadeumi nori ===
Dadeumi nori (다듬이놀이; lit. 'dadeumi play') is a tradition from Namwon, North Jeolla Province. It is a game or competition in which two women face each other across the dadeumitdol and compare their skills. A part of the game is to use various techniques to change the pitch of each strike. As laundry methods have modernized, the game is now rarely played.

== Social and cultural significance ==
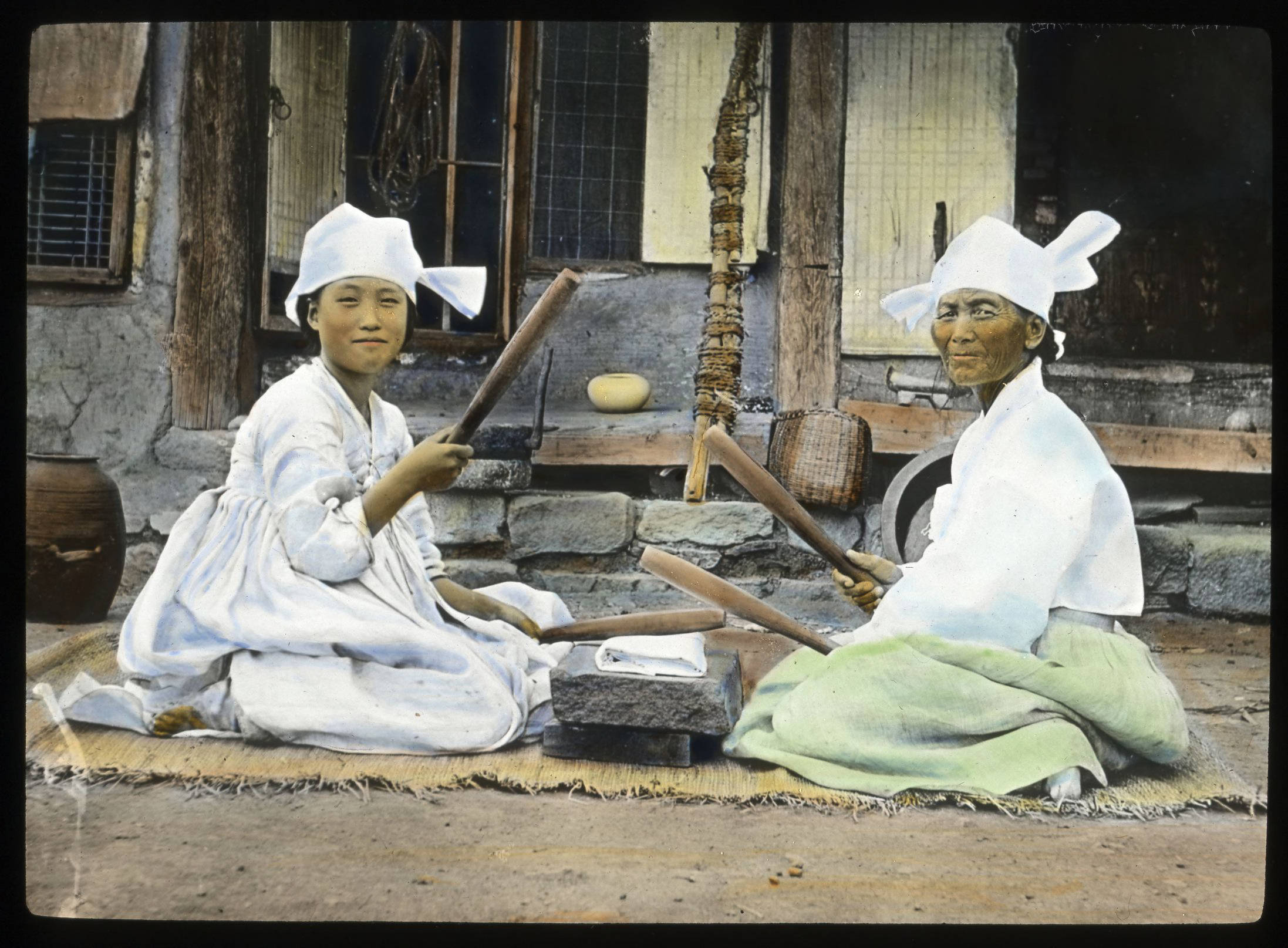
Korean women performing dadeumi in the early 20th century

Dadeumi is traditionally performed in late autumn and winter. The sound of two people tapping the cloth with four bats until late at night was a cherished aspect of Korean culture. Dadeumi also meant correcting the mind to the white-clad folk. It is sometimes referred to as an ingochim (인고침; 忍苦砧), which means that the pain of the heart that is too much to bear is tolerated with the dadeumi. Each dadeumitdol has a different tone, and is carved to make a sound like a percussion instrument. The sound is unique in each area where dadeumi is practiced. Dadeumitdol may be decorated with colorful paintings, and there are also dadeumitdol with details of the dead. These decorations are a reflection of the preference and culture of the time. Dadeumi was also useful for making windbreaking cloth. When making hanbok, the clothes were starched, which caused the fibers to spread particularly well during dadeumi so that the wind could be blocked well. Furthermore, the surface became less dirty because it became smooth and easier to wash. In modern times, dadeumi is less common in everyday life, but it is performed at festivals.

== In popular culture ==
"Sound of Dadeumi" (다듬잇소리) is a poem by Yang Ju-dong that depicts the lives and feelings of women who do dadeumi. One Yangpyeong folk song (양평민요) is about a woman who does dadeumi in simple language.

== See also ==
- Waulking song, Scottish folksongs sung by women as the worked cloth together
- Fulling, the pounding of woollen cloth
- Washing paddle
