= Peel (tool) =

Kitchen tool

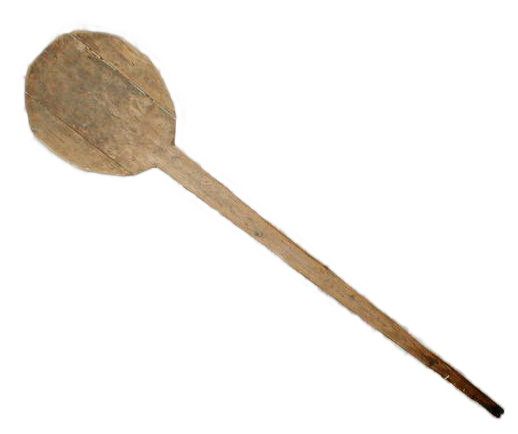
A wooden peel

A peel is a tool used by bakers to slide loaves of bread, pizzas, pastries, and other baked goods into and out of an oven. It is usually made of wood, with a flat surface for carrying the baked good and a handle extending from one side of that surface. Alternatively, the carrying surface may be made of sheet metal, which is attached to a wooden handle. Wood has the advantage that it does not become hot enough to burn the user's hands the way metal can, even if it is frequently in the oven. The word presumably derives from the French pelle, which describes both a peel and a shovel.

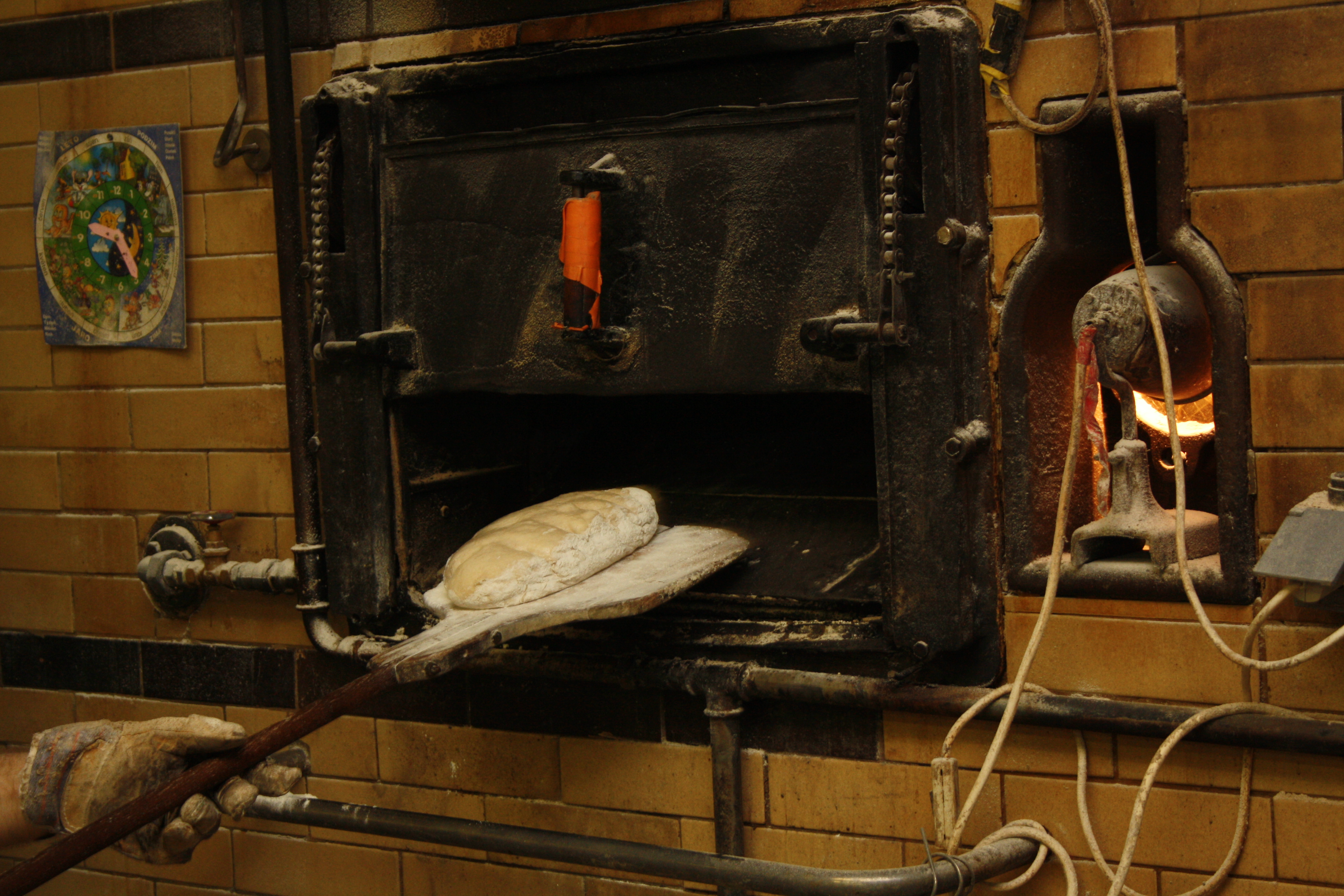
A loaf of bread being placed into an oven with a wooden peel (the baker also wears a glove as a shield from the heat)

A peel's intended functions are to:

- Transfer delicate breads, pastries, etc into an oven where transferring them directly by hand could deform their delicate structure.
- Allow food to be placed further back in an oven than could normally be reached by the baker.
- Keep the baker's hands out of the hottest part of an oven, or prevent the baker from burning their hands on the hot baked goods.

Prior to use, peels are often sprinkled with flour, cornmeal, or milled wheat bran, to allow baked goods to easily slide onto and off them.

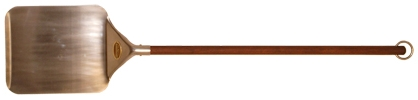
A wood and thin metal peel can work well with flat breads, in this case pizza, and is also sometimes called a pizza shovel.

There are peels of many sizes, with the length of the handle suited to the depth of the oven, and the size of the carrying surface suited to the size of the food it is meant to carry (for instance, slightly larger than the diameter of a pizza). Household peels commonly have handles around 15 cm long and carrying surfaces around 35 cm square, though handles range in length from vestigial (~6 centimeters) to extensive (~1.5 meters or more), and carrying surfaces range in size from miniature (~12 centimeters square) to considerably wide (1 meter square or more).

== Other tools ==
An alternative, and related, meaning of the word peel is a wooden pole with a smooth cross-piece at one end, which was used in printing houses of the hand-press period (before around 1850) to raise printed sheets onto a line to dry, and to take them down again once dried. The term is also sometimes used for the blade of an oar. All three meanings derive ultimately from the Latin pala, a spade.

== See also ==
- Dough scraper, a small, handheld, raw-dough working tool
- Washing paddle, a short handled, wooden washing tool
