= Washing paddle =

Hand tool used to do laundry

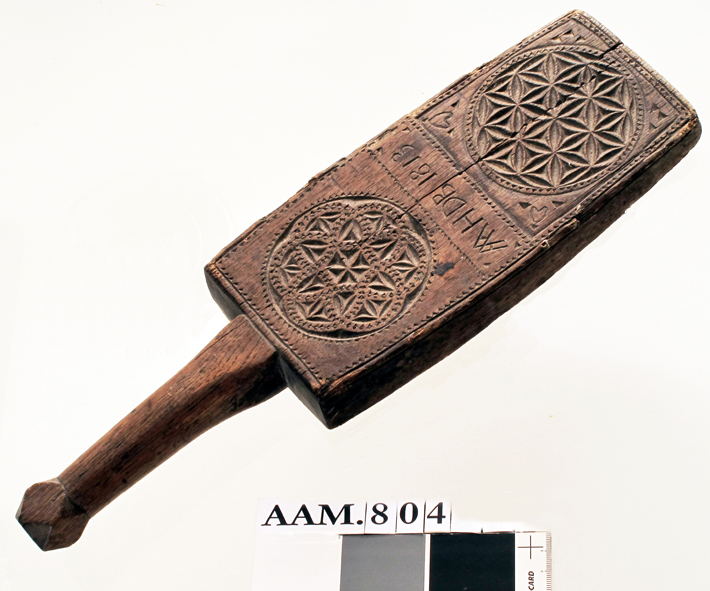
A washing paddle

The washing paddle (or washing beetle, battledore, laundry bat) is a hand tool used to do laundry. It is made of wood, shaped like a baker's peel, but with a much shorter handle used as a grip. It was used to beat the wet clothes and linens, pushing out the dirt by hammering the items against the washboard, or against the flat slabs built into the laundry area.

This was usually done at home or in the public wash-house (lavoir). In the latter case, each woman had to carry with her the washboard and the washing paddle. The paddle was used together with a washboard, made from a rectangular wooden frame with a series of wooden or metal reliefs or ripples mounted inside.

Mama had gathered up all of the longhandles and clothes that we wash. She also got the bedsheets off the beds and even the aperns. She brought out some of the lye soap that we make and also her big wooden washing paddle.

== See also ==
- Dadeumi
