= Long Èireannach =

Long Èireannach (Irish Ship) is a well known song in the Scottish Gaelic tradition known as Orain Luaidh, or waulking song, a type of work song that is sung by the women when fulling cloth. In Long Èireannach the sweetheart of each girl present is named in turn by the singers as the song proceeds, the whole of the workers taking up the chorus.
