= Waulking song =

Scottish folk songs sung while fulling cloth

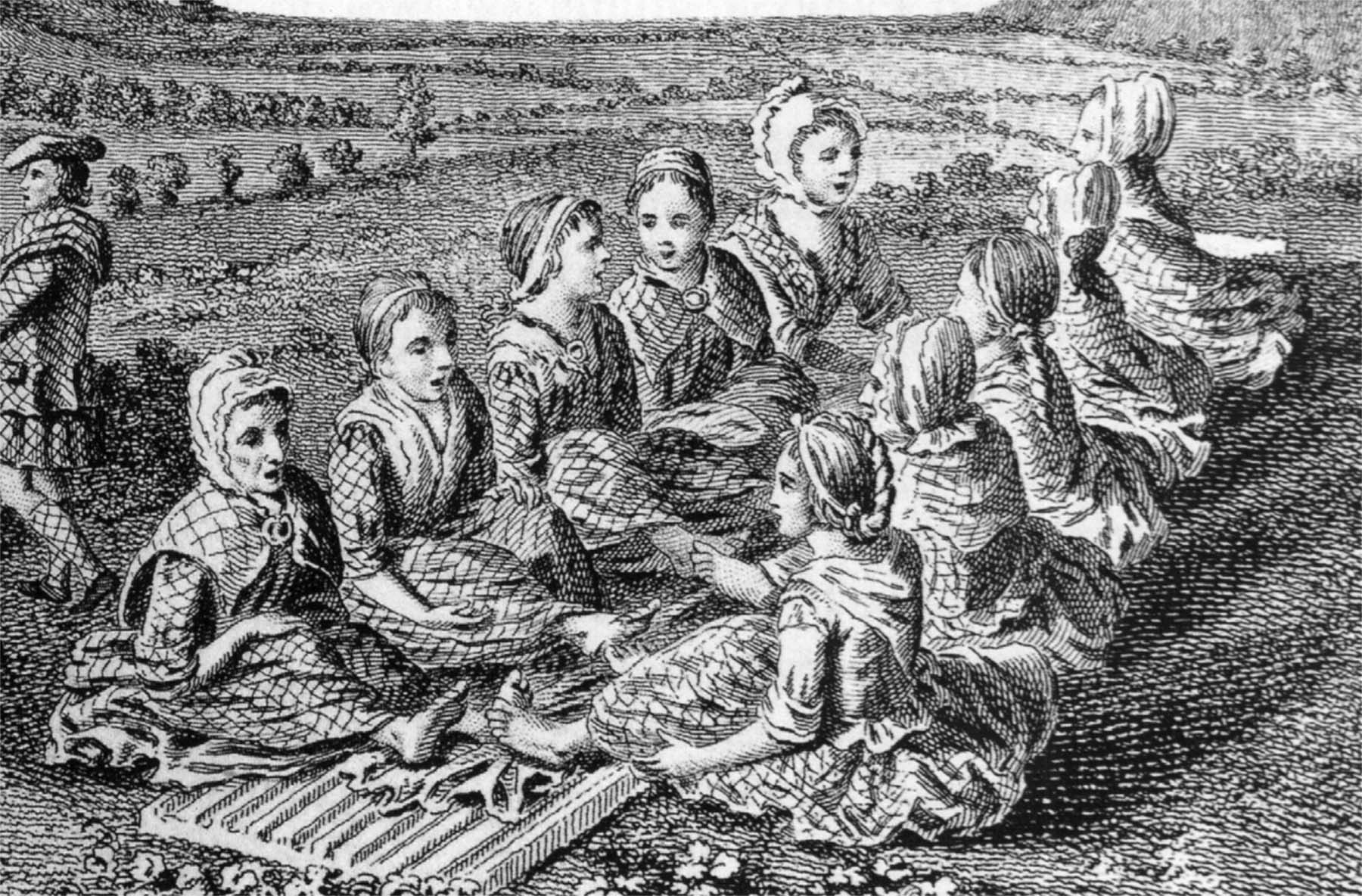
Engraving of Scotswomen singing while waulking cloth, c. 1770

Waulking songs (Scottish Gaelic: Òrain Luaidh) are Scottish folk songs, traditionally sung in the Gaelic language by women while fulling (waulking) cloth. This practice involved a group of women, who traditionally prepared cloth, rhythmically beating newly woven tweed or tartan cloth against a table or similar surface to lightly felt it and shrink it to better repel water. Simple, beat-driven songs were used to accompany the work.

A waulking session often begins with slow-paced songs, with the tempo increasing as the cloth becomes softer. As the singers work the cloth, they gradually shift it to the left so as to work it thoroughly. A tradition holds that moving the cloth anticlockwise is unlucky.

Typically one person sings the verse, while the others join in the chorus. As with many folk music forms, the lyrics of waulking songs are not always strictly adhered to. Singers might add or leave out verses depending on the particular length and size of tweed being waulked. Verses from one song might appear in another, and at times the lead singer might improvise to include events or people known locally. The chorus to many waulking songs consists of vocables, in which some of the words are meaningless, while others are regular Gaelic words (such as trom), but sometimes have no meaning in the context of the song. The vocables serve a function similar to 'tra la la' or 'hey hey hey' in other song forms.

Some waulking songs have a strict verse-and-chorus structure. In others, the vocables are sung at the end of each line of a verse. In a song like 'S Fliuch an Oidhche ('Wet is the Night'), also known as Coisich a Rùin ('Come on, My Love'), the last two lines of one verse become the first two lines of the following one. A tradition holds that it is bad luck to repeat a song during a waulking session, which may explain in part both the many verses of some songs and the large number of songs.

While fulling is a common practice across the world, it is only in Scotland that music became so strongly associated with it as to become an important cultural feature of the country. Waulking is rare in Scotland today, mostly confined to the Outer Hebrides, where it is performed as a celebration of heritage. The last true waulking (for the purpose of making cloth) is believed to have occurred during the 1950s.

During the Highland clearances, traditional methods of waulking spread with the Scottish diaspora. In Nova Scotia, and in particular, on Cape Breton Island, waulking is known as milling. Although in Scotland only women waulked cloth, in Nova Scotia both men and women took part in milling frolics. The practice continues as a cultural celebration today.

== In media ==
The song "Ebudæ" by Enya derives its melody from a Hebridean waulking song. Ebudae is the Latin name for the Hebrides.

The act of waulking, complete with a song, was showcased in season 1 of the television series Outlander. As Claire Fraser travels the Mackenzie lands with her eventual husband Jamie's party to collect rents, she spends time with a group of women who are waulking wool.

The act of waulking, including a song and the phrase "waulking the tweed," is shown in the season 9 Christmas special of Call The Midwife. When the midwives journey to the Outer Hebrides, one of their patients participates in waulking tweed, which is shown as a communal activity for the island's women.

== See also ==
- Long Èireannach
- Puirt à beul
- Dadeumi, a traditional Korean practice of beating cloth to a musical rhythm
