= Glassine =

Translucent, smooth and glossy type of paper

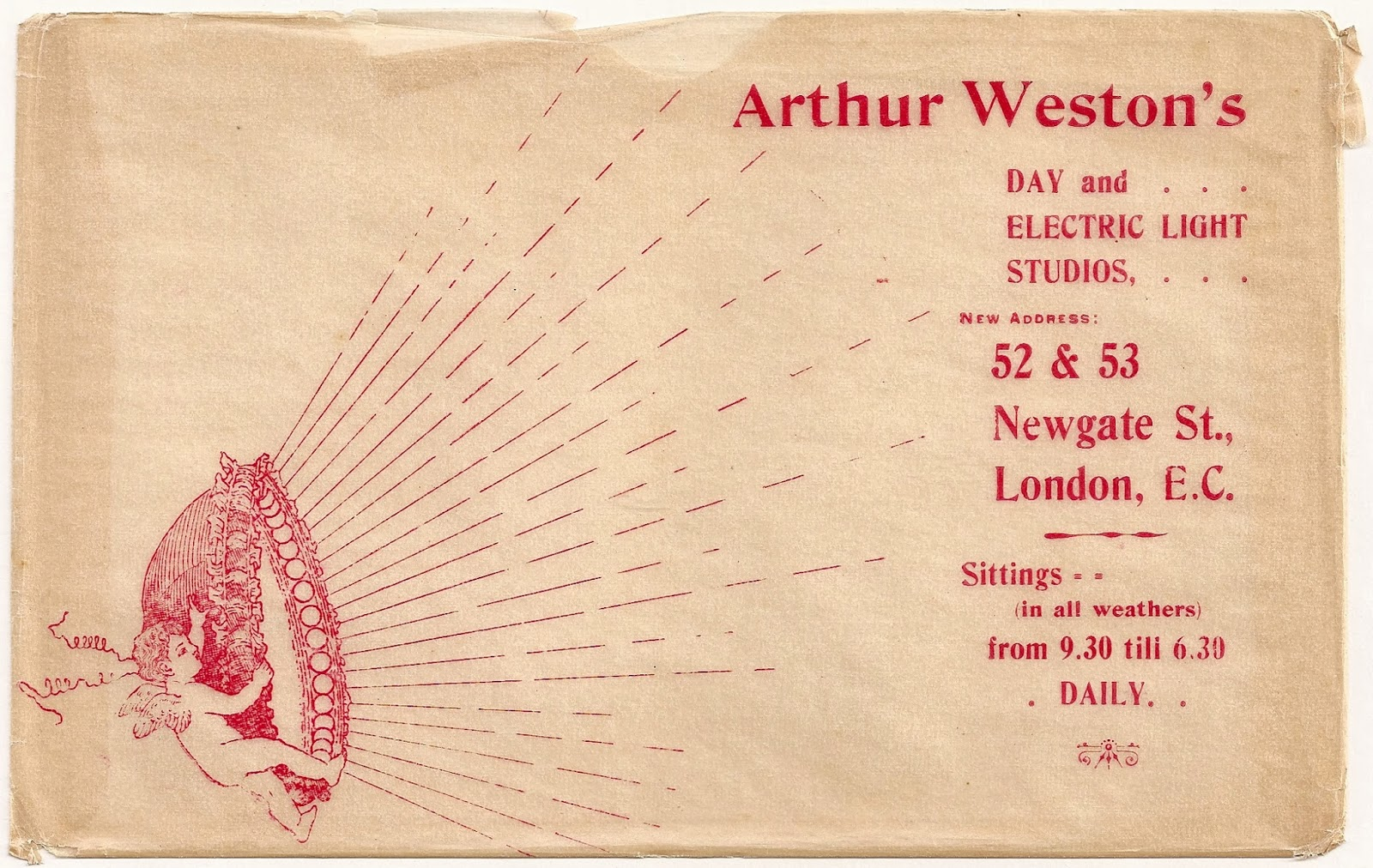
Printed glassine envelope for the photographer Arthur Weston, c. 1900

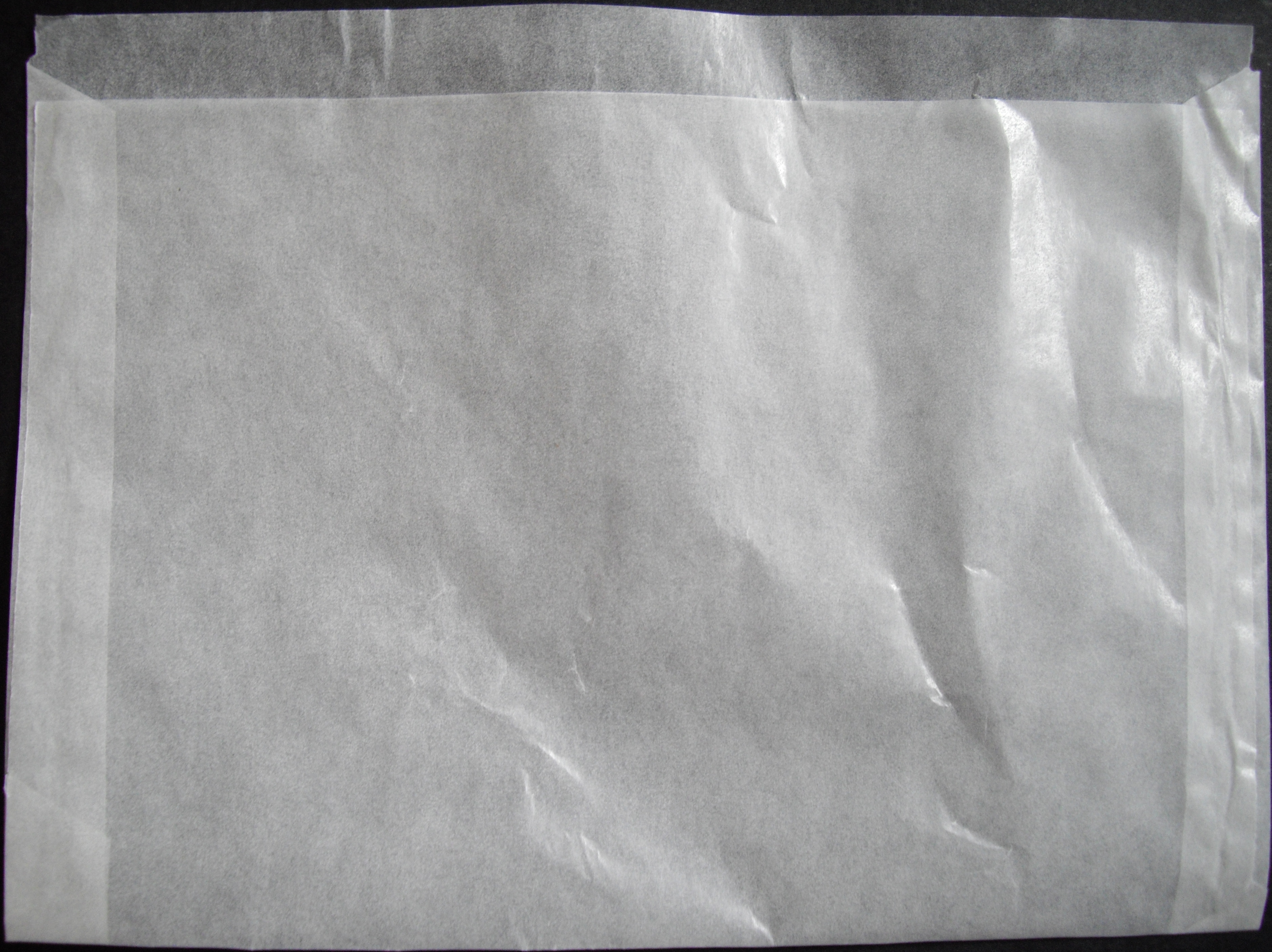
Glassine envelope

Glassine is a smooth and glossy paper that is air-, water-, and grease-resistant. It is typically available in densities between 50–90 g/m^{2} (0.010–0.018 lb/sq ft). It is naturally translucent, though dyes are sometimes added to the paper for color or opaqueness. Manufacturing takes place by first orienting the fibers in the same direction during the original pressing and drying followed immediately by supercalendering. Supercalendering passes the dried paper web through a stack of alternating steel-covered and fiber-covered rolls to increase density.

== Usage ==
- Most commonly, Glassine is used as a base for further silicone coating to manufacture release liner.
- Glassine is used as an interleaving paper in bookbinding, especially to protect fine illustrations from contact with facing pages. Glassine can be manufactured with a neutral pH and can prevent damage from spilling, exposure, or rubbing.
- Glassine adhesive tape has been used in book repair.
- In chemistry, glassine is used as an inexpensive weighing paper.
- In food service, glassine creates a grease resistant barrier between strips of individual products (for example: meat and baked goods).
- Glassine has been recommended for protecting the surface of stored acrylic paintings. However, glassine will adhere to soft (not completely cured) and medium-rich paint, especially when stored for an extended period of time. It may cause permanent damage to the painted surface. Therefore, art conservators do not recommend that it be used to wrap paintings.
- Philatelists use glassine envelopes to store stamps, and stamp hinges are made of glassine.
- Amateur insect collectors use glassine envelopes to store specimens temporarily in the field before they are mounted in a collection. Entomologists collecting for research may likewise use such envelopes to store whole specimens in the field.
- Glassine envelopes are often used to store illicit drugs such as cocaine and heroin.
- Photographers used glassine sleeves for many decades to safely store their processed films.
- Glassine pouches are used as protective packaging for optical lab components
- Glassine is also used to pack firecrackers, as it is moisture resistant.
- It is used for its transparent qualities to fold origami tessellations.
- Glassine is an outer covering on paperboard tubes, particularly those used in model rocketry, for water protection.
- In the mid-20th century, potato chips were packaged in glassine bags. Herman Lay was a pioneer of using glassine in the potato chips industry.

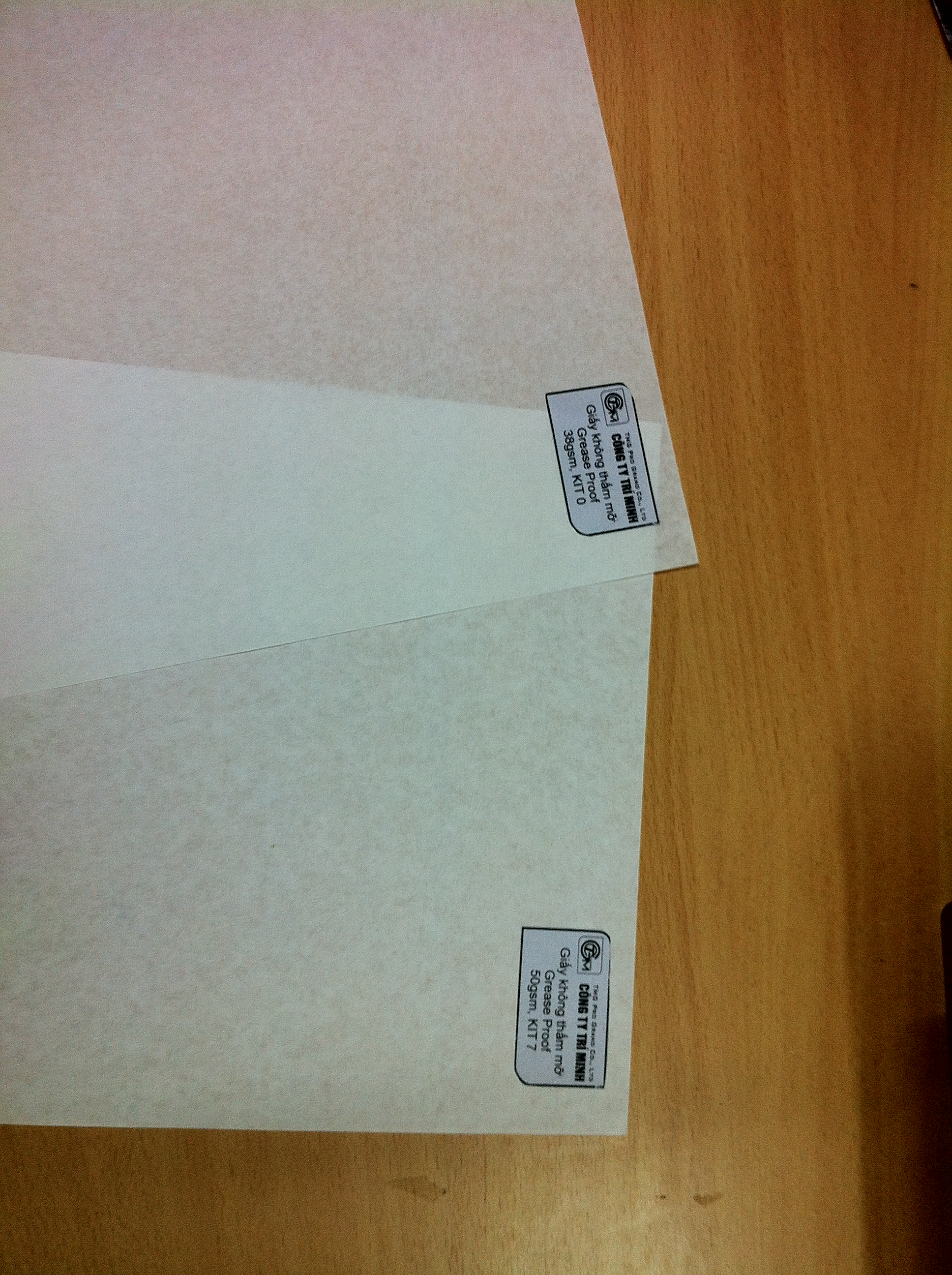
Sheets of greaseproof paper

=== Greaseproof paper ===
Greaseproof glassine paper is impermeable to oil or grease and is normally used in cooking or food packaging. Permeability rate can be measured using various tests: Kit(TAPPI T599), Turpentine(KAPPI T454), or ISO 16532. To create greaseproof paper, standard glassine is treated with starches, alginates, or carboxymethyl cellulose (CMC) in a size press to fill pores or alter the paper with fat repellent chemicals. Basis weights are usually 30–50 g/m^{2}.

==== History ====
First produced, in 1847, by Jean-André Poumarède and Louis Figuier, of France; through dipping cellulose based paper in a bath of two parts concentrated sulphuric acid and one part water, for a few seconds, before washing in water and ammonia.
