= Weighing paper =

Paper used while weighing substances on an analytical balance

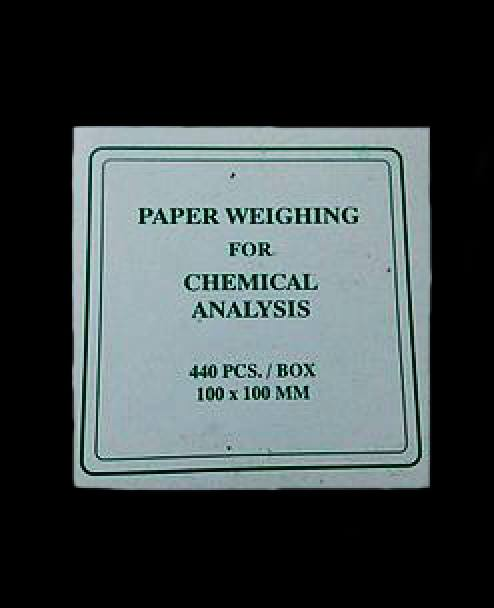
weighing paper in lab

Weighing paper is often used when weighing solid, powdery substances on an analytical balance. By preventing the substance from making contact with unwanted materials, the precision of the measurement may be increased.

== Production ==
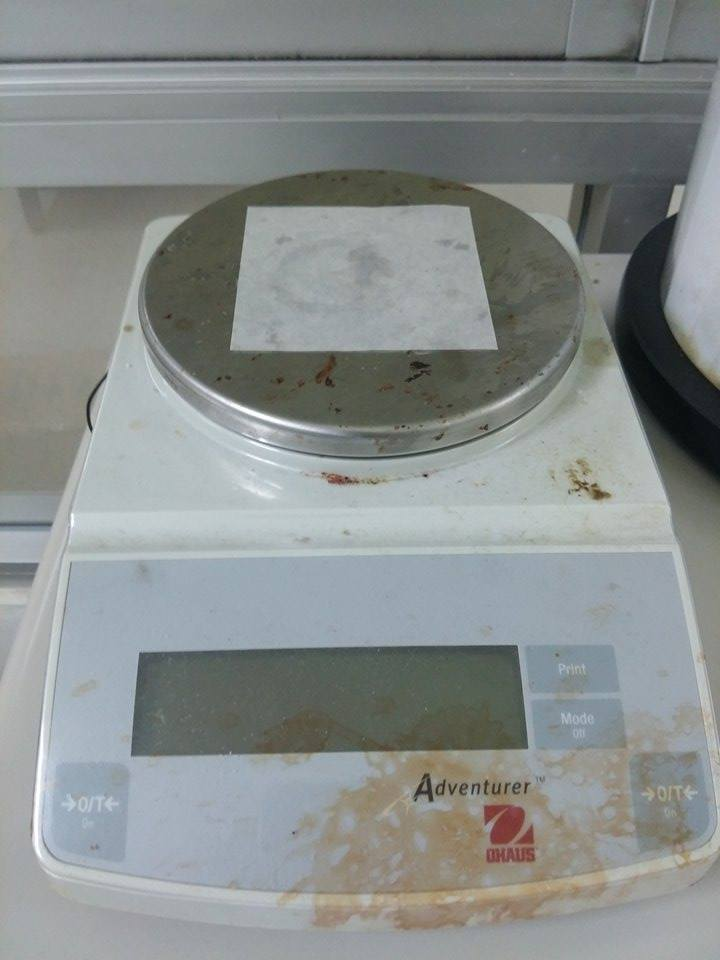
weighing paper on balance

Weighing paper is usually made through a process called calendering. First, a chemically manufactured paper pulp fiber is broken down and squeezed into the mold where it will dry into the sheet. Then, this sheet will be rolled down by hot roller. As a result, the pulp fiber will be flat and in the same direction. To make the paper very smooth and moist-resistant, it goes through the process repetitively, called super-calendering.

== Uses ==
Weighing paper can be folded into different shape depending on its uses.

1. Origami pouch: Origami pouch is a pocket-like shaped weighing paper that can be usually used for handling powdery, slippery samples.
2. Weighing boat: Weighing boat is a box-like folded weighing paper that can be usually used for handling solid, gunky samples.

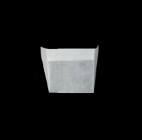
origami pouch (front)

== Types ==
1. Low-nitrogen weighing paper: Low-nitrogen weighing paper is the most common type of weighing paper that is used for analytical balances in the labs. The smooth texture prevents gunking up and absorption of samples on the paper.
2. Sulfur-free weighing paper: Sulfur-free weighing paper is usually used for weighing food materials. It is made up bleached glassine pulp and paper. As a result, it prevents the reaction of sample with other organic solvents such as alcohol, or acetone.

== Sizes ==
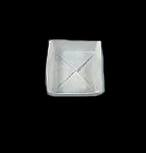
folded weighing boat

The weighing paper is provided in different sizes: 6 in by 6 in, 4 in by 4 in, and 3 in by 3 in.

== See also ==
- Glassine
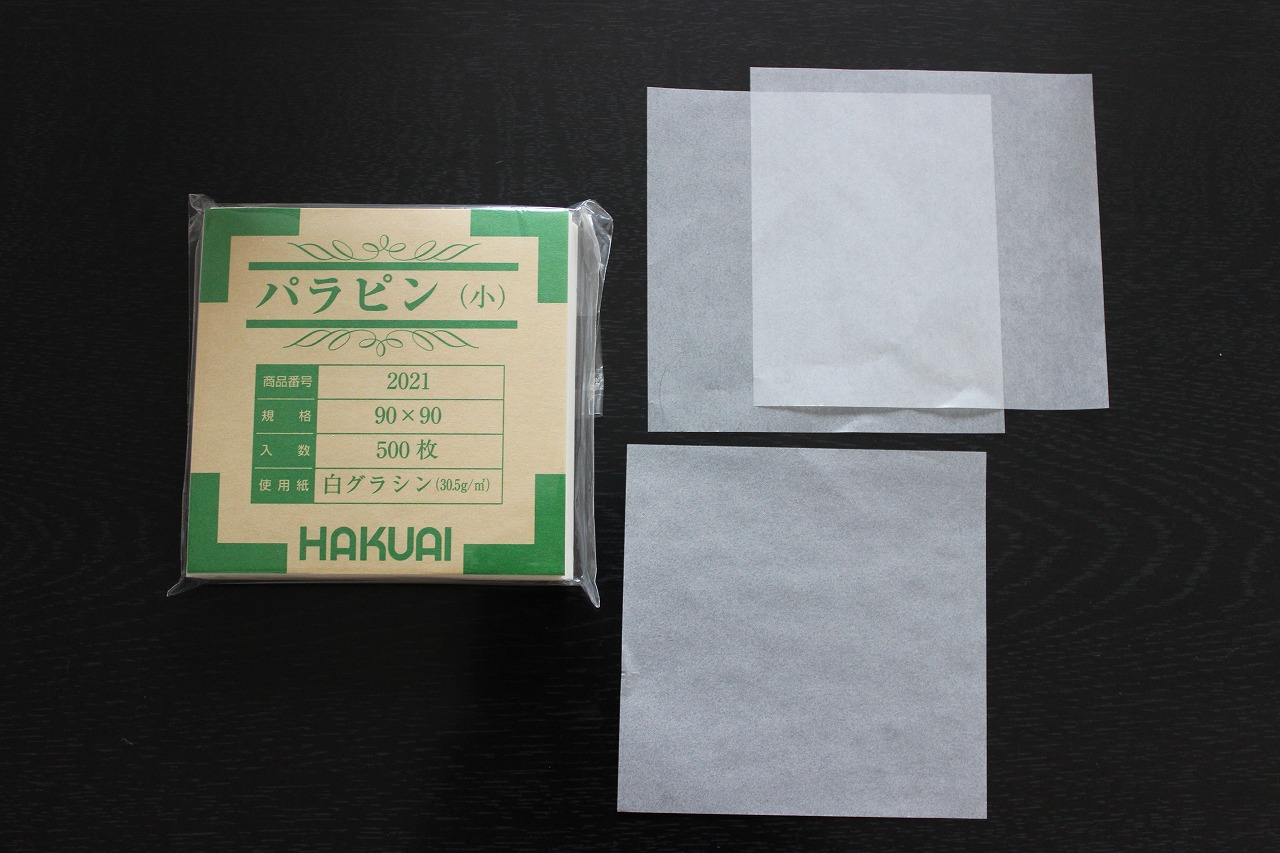
